= Results breakdown of the 1933 Spanish general election =

1933 Spanish general election
- 19 November 1933

All 473 seats of the Congress of Deputies 237 seats needed for a majority
- Turnout: 67.31%
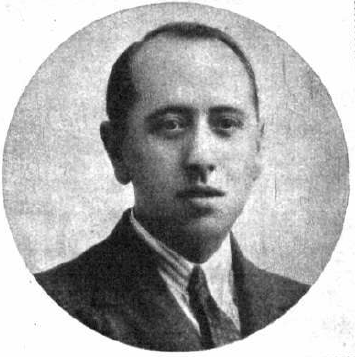

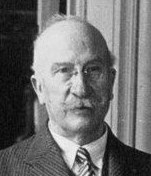

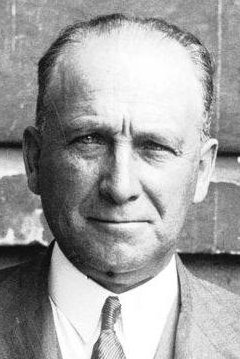
	First party	Second party	Third party
Leader	José María Gil-Robles y Quiñones	Alejandro Lerroux García	Francisco Largo Caballero
Party	CEDA	PRR	PSOE
Leader since	4 March 1933	1908	1932
Leader's seat	Salamanca & León	Valencia-capital	Madrid-capital
Last election	5 seats (Note: Compared to Popular Action results in 1931, which became part of the CEDA in 1932)	90 seats	115 seats
Seats won	102	101	60
Seat change	97	11	55
- Areas of most support: the right (dark blue), the centre-right (light blue), the centre (green) and the left (red).
Prime Minister before election
Diego Martínez Barrio
PRR
Prime Minister after election
Alejandro Lerroux
PRR

This is the results breakdown of the election to the Cortes Generales held in Spain on 19 November 1933, with the second round being held on 3 December 1933. The following tables shows the detailed results in each of the 60 constituencies.

== Electoral system ==
Spain was divided on several multi-member constituencies based on its 50 provinces with large cities becoming constituencies, as well as Ceuta and Melilla, making a total of 58 constituencies. The votes each voter was entitled to cast were 75%-80% of the seats at stake in the constituency. For a candidate to be elected in the first round of voting he needed, at least, 20% of votes cast. If this was not achieved, vacant seats were filled through a second round.

The new Electoral Law approved on July 27, 1933, introduced some changes compared to the one applied in the previous elections of June 1931: if no candidate achieved 40% of the votes on the first round then no candidate would be elected, while in the second round, only those who had reached 8% of the votes could participate. It also suppressed the constituencies of the cities of Granada, Cordoba and Cartagena by raising the amount of inhabitants needed for a city to become a constituency.

As a result of the aforementioned allocation, each Congress multi-member constituency was entitled the following seats:

Seats	Constituencies
19	Barcelona (city)
17	Madrid (city), La Coruña, Oviedo
15	Barcelona (Province)
14	Badajoz
13	Pontevedra, Valencia (Province), Córdoba, Jaén, Granada
10	Lugo, Toledo, Ciudad Real, Seville (Province)
9	Cáceres, Orense, León, Murcia (Province)
8	Madrid (Province), Málaga (Province)
7	Burgos, Santander, Salamanca, Navarre, Zaragoza (Province), Gerona, Tarragona, Baleares, Valencia (City), Albacete, Huelva, Almería
6	Zamora, Valladolid, Bilbao, Guipúzcoa, Lérida, Castellón, Cuenca, Seville (City), Santa Cruz de Tenerife
5	Ávila, Huesca, Teruel, Las Palmas
4	Málaga (City), Segovia, Palencia, Logroño, Zaragoza (City), Murcia (City), Guadalajara
3	Soria, Vizcaya (Province)
2	Álava
1	Ceuta, Melilla

== Nationwide ==
Party	Candidates	Seats (Note: It doesn't take into account congressmen elected on several provinces)
Spanish Confederation of Autonomous Right-wing Groups (CEDA); Popular Action (AP); Affiliated regional parties (Note: URD in La Coruña and Pontevedra, UDA in Lugo, AccAgr in León, AAR in Logroño, BAP in Soria, UCA in Palencia, UN in Navarre, UDB in the Ballearic Islands, DRV in Valencia and Castellón, DRA in Alicante, UAP in Albacete, AAM in Ciudad Real, ARA in Guadalajara, DRAC in Cáceres, UDG in Granada and UDI in Cádiz)	130; 72; 58 (Note: Hernández Pérez was nominated by the DRA but he wasn't affiliated with the CEDA)	102; 57; 45
Radical Republican Party (PRR); Affiliated regional parties (Note: The Autonomist Republican Union Party (PURA) in Valencia, the Tinerfeño Republican Party (PRT) in Santa Cruz de Tenerife, the Federal Republican Party of Mallorca (PRFM) and the Republican Union Party (PUR) in Melilla)	229; 25	101; 21
Spanish Socialist Workers' Party (PSOE)	252	60
Agrarians (A)	52	40
Catalanist League (Lliga)	35	24
Traditionalist Communion (CT)	38	19
Conservative Republican Party (PRC)	64	17
Republican Left of Catalonia (ERC)	29	16
Spanish Renovation (RE)	37	15
Basque Nationalist Party (PNV)	17	12
Liberal Democrat Republican Party (PRLD)	14	9
Republican Action (AR); Catalan Party of Republican Action (PCAR)	70; 4	5; 1
Federal Republican Party "Franchystas" (PRF)	16	4
Independent Radical Socialist Republican Party (PRRSI); Catalan Radical Socialists (RSC)	21; 2	3
Progressive Republican Party (PRP)	17	3
Galician Republican Party (PRG)	13	3
Socialist Union of Catalonia (USC)	5	3
Agrarian Federation (FAgr)	3	3
Centre Republican Party (PRCen)	2	2
Communist Party of Spain (PCE)	277	1
Radical Socialist Republican Party (PRRS)	67	1
Rural Action (ARural)	4	1
Union of Rabassaires (UdR)	1	1
Regionalist Party of Mallorca (PRMall)	1	1
Spanish Nationalist Party (PNE)	1	1
Spanish Phalanx (FE)	1	1
Independents (Ind)	159	26
Workers' and Peasant's Bloc (BOC)	33	
Federal Democratic Republican Party "Barrioberistas" (PRDF)	21	
Catalanist Republican Action (ACR)	16	
Federal Party "Pimargallianos" (PF)	15	
Radical Socialist Left (IRS)	15	
Iberian Social Party (PSI)	12	
Galicianist Party (PG)	8	
Nationalist Party of the Left (PNRE)	8	
Democratic Union of Catalonia (UDC)	4	
Basque Nationalist Action (ANV)	1	
Others	9	
Total	1682	474

After the elections, the Congress of Deputies was made up of the following parliamentary groups:

Parliamentary group	Parties	Seats
Popular Agrarian	CEDA	115
Radical	PRR	101
Socialist	PSOE, USC	59
Agrarian	A, FAgr, ARural	30
Regionalist	Lliga	26
Traditionalist	CT	21
Catalan Left	ERC, UdR	17
Conservative Republican	PRC	16
Monarchist	RE	13
Nationalist	PNV	12
Independent Rightist	Ind	11
Republican Left	AR, PRRSI, PRG	11
Liberal Democrat	PRLD	10
Independent Republican	PRP, Ind	7
No group	Others	9
Total		453

== Galicia ==
Party	Candidates	Seats
Radical Republican Party (PRR)	29	13
Spanish Confederation of Autonomous Right-wing Groups (CEDA); Regional Union of Rights (URD); Union of Rightists and Agrarians (UDA); Popular Action (AP)	15; 11; 3; 1	11; 7; 3; 1
Spanish Renovation (RE)	9	6
Conservative Republican Party (PRC)	10	4
Galician Republican Party (PRG)	13	3
Agrarians (A)	4	3
Liberal Democrat Republican Party (PRLD)	2	1
Independents (Ind)	43	8
Communist Party of Spain (PCE)	31	
Socialist Spanish Workers' Party (PSOE)	26	
Radical Socialist Republican Party (PRRS)	12	
Galicianist Party (PG)	8	
Republican Action (AR)	5	
Independent Radical Socialist Republican Party (PRRSI)	5	
Federal Democratic Republican Party "Barrioberistas" (PRDF)	2	
Traditionalist Communion (CT)	1	
Radical Socialist Left (IRS)	1	
Progressive Republican Party (PRP)	1	
Total	217	49

=== La Coruña ===
17 seats. 13 votes per citizen.

Alliance	Party	Candidate	Votes
Right-wing Coalition	CEDA-URD	Benito Blanco-Rajoy	146.398
Right-wing Coalition	CEDA-URD	Felipe Gil Casares	137.118
Right-wing Coalition	Ind	Ángel Aperribay	120.006
Right-wing Coalition	Ind	Eduardo O'Shea	117.369
Right-wing Coalition	RE	José Calvo Sotelo (Note: He was also elected in Orense. Resigns in order to take his seat as a representative of that province)	114.252
Right-wing Coalition	CEDA-URD	José María Méndez Gil Brandón	113.662
Right-wing Coalition	RE	José del Moral Sanjurjo	103.329
Right-wing Coalition	CEDA-URD	Eugenio V. Gundín	89.057
Right-wing Coalition	CEDA-URD	José Portal	80.224
Right-wing Coalition	CEDA-URD	Antolín Sánchez Valeiro	79.329
Right-wing Coalition	CEDA-URD	Fernando Pérez Barreiro	77.170
Right-wing Coalition	CEDA-URD	Severino Lamas	67.691
Right-wing Coalition	CT	Rafael Díaz-Aguado	60.642
Republican Coalition (Note: José Reino Caamaño was both a candidate for the Republican Coalition and the Republican Right list)	PRG	Emilio González López	121.166
Republican Coalition	Ind	Antonio Rodríguez Pérez	112.719
Republican Coalition	Ind	José Miñones	107.089
Republican Coalition	Ind	Manuel Iglesias	106.815
Republican Coalition	PRG	Alejandro Rodríguez Cadarso	97.219
Republican Coalition	PRG	Santiago Casares Quiroga	88.962
Republican Coalition	PRC	José Reino Caamaño	87.128
Republican Coalition	Ind	José García Ramos	85.474
Republican Coalition	Ind	Leandro Pita Romero	85.916
Republican Coalition	Ind	Olegario Campos	67.029
Republican Coalition	PRG	José López Bouza	52.151
Republican Coalition	Ind	Segundo Cotovad	49.039
Republican Coalition	Ind	Enrique de la Torre	44.079
Radicals	PRR	Atanagildo Pardo	59.910
Radicals	PRR	Gerardo Abad Conde	51.878
Radicals	PRR	Francisco Vázquez	39.261
Radicals	PRR	Alfredo Saralegui	23.288
Radicals	PRR	Ramón Cortiella	10.058
Radicals	PRR	Manuel Nogueira	2.497
Radicals	PRR	José Andión	2.418
Radicals	PRR	César Alvajar	1.890
Radicals	PRR	Aurelio Fernández Morales	1.551
Radicals	PRR	José Vicente López Chacón	1.254
Radicals	PRR	Diego Fernández Gómez	1.240
Federal Galicianist	PG	Ramón Suárez Picallo	54.635
Federal Galicianist	PG	Ramón Martínez López	21.504
Federal Galicianist	PG	Manuel Banet Fontenla	17.886
Federal Galicianist	PG	Alfonso Rodríguez Castelao	945
	PRG	Victorino Veiga	37.350
Socialists	PSOE	Ramón Beade	35.359
Socialists	PSOE	Manuel Montero	29.462
Socialists	PSOE	Edmundo Lorenzo	28.848
Socialists	PSOE	Ángel Mato	24.475
Socialists	PSOE	Antonio Santamaría	21.836
Socialists	PSOE	Alfonso Quintana	21.116
Socialists	PSOE	Jaime Quintanilla	19.286
Socialists	PSOE	Antonio Fernández Tudó	18.993
Socialists	PSOE	Marcial Fernández Vázquez	18.601
Socialists	PSOE	Manuel Morgado	14.170
Socialists	PSOE	Ramón Fernández Hermida	13.597
Socialists	PSOE	Bernardo Miño	12.953
Socialists	PSOE	Ramón Souto	11.534
Republican Right	PRC	Jaime Concheiro Iglesias	28.502
Republican Right	PRC	Marcelino Etchevarría Naveyra	19.721
Republican Right	PRC	Ernesto Pons Fernández	12.187
Republican Right	PRC	Ramón Montero Quiroga	9.036
	Ind	Juan Pérez Serrabona	21.578
	Ind	Juan Martínez de Tejada	11.642
	Ind	Álvaro de las Casas	8.909
Republican Left	PRDF	José A. García	8.485
Republican Left	PRRSI	Gonzalo Acosta	7.712
Republican Left	PRRSI	José Bua	7.466
Republican Left	PRDF	José Carnero Valenzuela (Note: Supported by the PG)	6.766
Republican Left	PRRSI	Francisco Rey	6.682
Republican Left	PRRSI	Fernando Cortés	6.537
Communists	PCE	José Silva	6.733
Communists	PCE	Gumersindo Montero	6.497
Communists	PCE	Manuel Escáriz	4.291
Communists	PCE	Guillermo Cedrón	3.865
Communists	PCE	Severindo López	3.010
Communists	PCE	Eladio Freire	2.856
Communists	PCE	Juan Gato	2.851
Communists	PCE	José Fernández Vázquez	2.789
Communists	PCE	Jesús Liste	2.746
Communists	PCE	José Vergara	2.413
Communists	PCE	Luis Ferro	2.378
Communists	PCE	Luciano Anca	2.323
Communists	PCE	Eladio Aba	2.288
	Ind	Manuel Díaz Rozas	5.086
	Ind	Amador Rodríguez Guerra	3.591
	Ind	Juan J. González	3.198
	Ind	Ramón Fabeiro	1.319
	Ind	Pascual Zaera	1.215
Radical Socialists	PRRS	Jesús Mejuto	1.019
Radical Socialists	PRRS	Aurelia Gutiérrez	561
Radical Socialists	PRRS	Jesús San Luis	383
Radical Socialists	PRRS	Antonio Villar	254

=== Pontevedra ===
13 seats. 10 votes per citizen.

Alliance	Party	Candidate	Votes
Republican Coalition	PRR	Emiliano Iglesias	77.529
Republican Coalition	PRLD	Isidoro Millán	66.603
Republican Coalition	PRR	José López Varela	62.061
Republican Coalition	PRR	Vicente Sierra	60.537
Republican Coalition	PRC	Fernando Villamarín	59.878
Republican Coalition	PRR	Ramón Salgado	58.234
Republican Coalition	PRR	Antonio Prieto	54.369
Republican Coalition	PRR	Luis Fontaiña	54.167
Republican Coalition	PRC	Leandro del Río	47.766
Republican Coalition	PRR	Pedro Varela	47.295
Union of the Right	A	Alfredo García Ramos	68.050
Union of the Right	CEDA-URD	Severino Barros	67.280
Union of the Right	CEDA-URD	Víctor Lis	67.111
Union of the Right	CEDA-URD	Nicasio Guisasola	63.317
Union of the Right	RE	Honorio Maura	58.959
Union of the Right	RE	Alfonso Senra	49.343
Union of the Right	Ind	Paulino Yáñez	43.617
Union of the Right	Ind	Fernando Sotelo	42.923
Union of the Right	Ind	José García Señorans	42.074
Union of the Right	Ind	Ricardo Melero	41.905
Galicianist Coalition	PRG	Laureano Gómez Paratcha	43.665
Galicianist Coalition	PRG	Amancio Caamaño	40.522
Galicianist Coalition	AR	Telmo Bernárdez	37.158
Galicianist Coalition	PRG	Gonzalo Martín	36.483
Galicianist Coalition	AR	Alejandro Viana	36.204
Galicianist Coalition	PG	Alfonso Rodríguez Castelao	32.325
Galicianist Coalition	Ind	Amado Garra	31.842
Galicianist Coalition	PG	Valentín Paz Andrade	31.425
Galicianist Coalition	Ind	Antonio Alonso Ríos	28.573
Galicianist Coalition	Ind	Ramón Alonso Martínez	26.479
Socialists	PSOE	José Gómez Ossorio	26.572
Socialists	PSOE	Enrique Heraclio	26.515
Socialists	PSOE	Eugenio Arbones	22.117
Socialists	PSOE	Amado Guiance	19.000
Socialists	PSOE	Alejandro Otero	18.045
Socialists	PSOE	Mosquera	14.839
Socialists	PSOE	Araujo Pérez	12.970
Socialists	PSOE	Tilve	12.961
Socialists	PSOE	Martínez Garrido	12.592
Socialists	PSOE	Blanco Solla	12.505
Radical Socialists	PRRS	Celestino Poza	7.651
Radical Socialists	PRRS	José Adrio	5.801
Radical Socialists	PRRS	José B. Méndez	4.650
	Ind	Indalecio Tizón	7.548
Communists	PCE	Manuel Gama	5.753
Communists	PCE	Manuel García Filgueira	5.416
Communists	PCE	José Silva	4.896
Communists	PCE	Amalia Figueroa	4.339
Communists	PCE	Manuel Rodríguez Ríos	4.299
Communists	PCE	Jesús Garrote	4.297
Communists	PCE	Eduardo Araujo	3.714
Communists	PCE	Manuel Dios	3.678
Communists	PCE	Juan Martínez Vila	3.321
Communists	PCE	José Villar	3.300
	Ind	Taboada Montoto	3.184
	Ind	Pardo Ocampo	1.920

=== Lugo ===
10 seats. 8 votes per citizen.

Alliance	Party	Candidate	Seats
Republican Coalition	PRR	Manuel Becerra	83.148
Republican Coalition	PRC	Enrique Gómez	80.223
Republican Coalition	PRR	Gumersindo Rico	79.195
Republican Coalition	Ind	Manuel Saco	64.251
Republican Coalition	PRC	Luis Recaséns	57.966
Republican Coalition	PRR	Ubaldo Aspiazu	56.020
Republican Coalition	PRR	José Cobreros	50.659
Republican Coalition	PRR	Ricardo Gasset	44.158
Union of Rightists and Agrarians	CEDA-UDA	Ángel López Pérez	76.538
Union of Rightists and Agrarians	A	Luis Rodríguez de Viguri	71.497
Union of Rightists and Agrarians	CEDA-UDA	Felipe Lazcano	66.186
Union of Rightists and Agrarians	CEDA-UDA	José María Montenegro	64.877
Galician Republicans	PRG	Roberto Ouro	51.143
Galician Republicans	PRG	José Calviño	50.165
Galician Republicans	PRG	José Montero	47.642
Galician Republicans	PRG	José M. Díaz	27.651
Galician Republicans	PRG	César López Otero	21.092
Galician Republicans	PRG	Víctor Martínez Rodríguez	5.311
	Ind	Cándido Fernández López	43.965
	A	Antonio Maseda Bouso	38.772
	Ind	Virgilio Fernández de la Vega	36.740
Radical Socialists	PRRS	Luis Soto Menor	28.231
Radical Socialists	PRRS	Niceto José García Armendaritz	2.001
Radical Socialists	IRS	Ramón Méndez Castro-Jato	1.808
	Ind	Manuel Portela Valladares	27.829
Liberal Democrat	PRLD	Pedro Menéndez y García del Busto	21.252
Socialists	PSOE	Juan Tizón	18.587
Socialists	PSOE	Jacinto Calvo	13.225
	Ind	Luis Peña Novo (Note: Supported by the PRRS and the PRRSI)	18.315
Spanish Renovation	RE	José Soto Reguera	13.397
Spanish Renovation	RE	José Calvo Sotelo	1.314
Republican Action	AR	Pedro Seijas Guerra	10.926
Progressive	PRP	Enrique Álvarez de Neyra y Sánchez	6.372
Galicianists	PG	Pedro Basanta	5.367
Galicianists	PG	Gerardo Álvarez Gallego	2.427
Independent Radical Socialist	PRRSI	Jesús Vázquez Gayoso	5.075
Communist	PCE	José Antonio Balbontín	2.366
	Ind	Daniel Vázquez Campo	1.950
	Ind	Germán Anllo	1.889
	Ind	Darío Rodríguez	1.658
	Ind	Joaquín Gutiérrez-Segura	1.085
	Ind	Manuel Garro	1.072

=== Orense ===
9 seats. 7 votes per citizen.

Alliance	Party	Candidate	Votes
Union of the Right	RE	José Sabucedo	91.703
Union of the Right	RE	José Calvo Sotelo	87.767
Union of the Right	A	Antonio Taboada	77.167
Union of the Right	RE	Andrés Amado	66.376
Union of the Right	CEDA-AP	Carlos Taboada	59.112
Union of the Right	Ind	Demetrio Maciá	53.786
Union of the Right	Ind	Luis Espada	46.704
Radicals	PRR	Basilio Álvarez	80.021
Radicals	PRR	Justo Villanueva	77.284
Radicals	PRR	Luis Fábrega	69.687
Radicals	PRR	Fernando Ramos	69.350
Radicals	PRR	Bernardo Castro	57.507
Radicals	PRR	Antonio Casar	33.169
Radical Socialists	PRRS	Alfonso Pazos	47.203
Radical Socialists	PRRS	Eligio Núñez	9.745
Radical Socialists	PRRS	Manuel Sueiro	9.079
Conservative	PRC	Eladio López Pérez	33.728
Socialist	PSOE	Manuel Suárez Castro	29.258
Republican Action	AR	Manuel Martínez-Risco	27.503
Republican Action	AR	Ángel Romero	19.449
	Ind	José Estévez	18.329
	Ind	Manuel Lezón	6.611
Communists	PCE	Benigno Álvarez	3.274
Communists	PCE	Nicanor Vázquez	2.463
Communists	PCE	Manuel Docampo	1.925
Communists	PCE	José Silva	1.461
Communists	PCE	Domingo Mateo	1.447
Communists	PCE	Cástor Gómez	1.182
Communists	PCE	Eduardo Araujo	1.132

== Asturias and the Region of León ==
Party	Candidates	Seats
Spanish Confederation of Autonomous Right-wing Groups (CEDA); Popular Action (AP); Agrarian Action (AccAgr)	15; 11; 4	15; 11; 4
Liberal Democrat Republican Party (PRLD)	8	8
Spanish Socialist Workers' Party (PSOE)	24	5
Agrarians (A)	5	5
Conservative Republican Party (PRC)	11	2
Radical Republican Party (PRR)	8	1
Radical Socialist Republican Party (PRRS)	8	1
Traditionalist Communion (CT)	1	1
Independents (Ind)	6	1
Communist Party of Spain (PCE)	29	
Independent Radical Socialist Republican Party (PRRSI)	8	
Republican Action (AR)	7	
Progressive Republican Party (PRP)	4	
Federal Democratic Republican Party "Barrioberistas" (PRDF)	4	
Peasants' Bloc (BCamp)	3	
Federal Party "Pimargallianos" (PF)	2	
Total	142	39

=== Oviedo ===
17 seats. 13 votes per citizen

Alliance	Party	Candidate	Votes
Liberal Democrat-Popular Action Coalition	PRLD	Melquíades Álvarez	127.475
Liberal Democrat-Popular Action Coalition	CEDA-AP	José M. Fernández-Ladreda	125.155
Liberal Democrat-Popular Action Coalition	PRLD	Alfonso Muñoz de Diego	125.077
Liberal Democrat-Popular Action Coalition	CEDA-AP	José María Moutas	125.062
Liberal Democrat-Popular Action Coalition	PRLD	Pedro Miñor	124.896
Liberal Democrat-Popular Action Coalition	CEDA-AP	Romualdo Alvargonzález	124.841
Liberal Democrat-Popular Action Coalition	PRLD	Ramón Álvarez-Valdés	124.804
Liberal Democrat-Popular Action Coalition	CEDA-AP	Bernardo Aza	124.798
Liberal Democrat-Popular Action Coalition	PRLD	Alfredo Martínez	124.689
Liberal Democrat-Popular Action Coalition	CEDA-AP	Gonzalo Merás	124.645
Liberal Democrat-Popular Action Coalition	PRLD	Manuel Pedregal	124.636
Liberal Democrat-Popular Action Coalition	CEDA-AP	Eduardo Piñán	123.375
Liberal Democrat-Popular Action Coalition	PRLD	Mariano Merediz	123.158
Socialists	PSOE	Teodomiro Menéndez	85.386
Socialists	PSOE	Matilde de la Torre	84.450
Socialists	PSOE	Amador Fernández Montes	83.759
Socialists	PSOE	Veneranda García-Blanco	83.130
Socialists	PSOE	Juan Pablo García Álvarez	83.077
Socialists	PSOE	Graciano Antuña	83.070
Socialists	PSOE	Manuel Martínez	82.361
Socialists	PSOE	Manuel Vigil	82.287
Socialists	PSOE	Federico Landrove	82.255
Socialists	PSOE	Juan Antonio Suárez	81.889
Socialists	PSOE	Lazaro García Suárez	81.772
Socialists	PSOE	José Fernández Castañón	81.686
Socialists	PSOE	Lorenzo López Mulero	79.594
Republican Coalition	ASR (Note: Even though the ASR was dissolved in 1932, Rico-Avello still promoted himself as a member of this extinct association)	Manuel Rico-Avello	39.220
Republican Coalition	BCamp	Ángel Menéndez Suárez	37.935
Republican Coalition	BCamp	Ramón Díaz Pérez	37.068
Republican Coalition	PRC	Pío Linares Lamadrid	36.838
Republican Coalition	BCamp	Ángel Sarmiento González	36.578
Republican Coalition	PRR	José A. Buylla Godino	35.980
Republican Coalition	PRC	Julián Ayesta	35.975
Republican Coalition	PRC	Félix Cifuentes	35.710
Republican Coalition	PRR	Álvaro Díaz Quiñones	35.646
Republican Coalition	PF	Emilio Niembro González	34.688
Republican Coalition	PF	Laureano Menéndez	34.467
Republican Coalition	Ind	Manuel Cadierno	33.947
Republican Coalition	Ind	José Antonio Caicoya	33.871
Republican Left	PRRS	José Díaz Fernández	10.518
Republican Left	AR	Valentín Álvarez-Muñiz	10.214
Republican Left	PRRS	Honesto Suárez	9.958
Republican Left	PRRS	Luis Ochoa	9.839
Republican Left	PRRS	Félix Miaja	9.800
Republican Left	AR	Saturnino Escobedo	9.449
Republican Left	PRRS	Celso Fernández García	9.448
Republican Left	AR	Adolfo Alas	9.349
Republican Left	PRRS	Eduardo Colubi	9.289
Republican Left	PRRS	José Maldonado	9.199
Republican Left	AR	César Milego	8.884
Republican Left	AR	Jesús Morán	8.751
Republican Left	AR	Ángel Pérez	8.741
Communists	PCE	Isidoro Acevedo	17.623
Communists	PCE	Dolores Ibárruri	17.399
Communists	PCE	Jesús Hernández Tomas	17.339
Communists	PCE	Críspulo Gutiérrez	17.204
Communists	PCE	José de la Fuente	16.966
Communists	PCE	Carlos Vega	16.697
Communists	PCE	Aquilino Fernández Roces	16.688
Communists	PCE	Mariano Fernández	16.556
Communists	PCE	Fernando Rodríguez Villaseco	16.513
Communists	PCE	Ángel Álvarez	16.481
Communists	PCE	Simón Díaz Sarro	16.460
Communists	PCE	Gabino Fernández	16.252
Communists	PCE	Herminio García Álvarez	16.204
Radical Socialist-Federalist Coalition	PRRSI	Marcelino Domingo	1.815
Radical Socialist-Federalist Coalition	PRRSI	Victoria Kent	1.737
Radical Socialist-Federalist Coalition	PRRSI	Francisco Pando	1.378
Radical Socialist-Federalist Coalition	PRRSI	Jaime Ovejero	1.104
Radical Socialist-Federalist Coalition	PRDF	Eduardo Barriobero	<1000
Radical Socialist-Federalist Coalition	PRDF	Nuño	<1000
Radical Socialist-Federalist Coalition	PRDF	Quirós	<1000
Radical Socialist-Federalist Coalition	PRDF	Sirgo	<1000

=== León ===
9 seats. 7 votes per citizen.

Alliance	Party	Candidate	Votes
Union of the Right	CEDA-AP	José María Gil Robles (Note: He was also elected in Salamanca. Resigns in order to take his seat as a representative of that province)	85.004
Union of the Right	A	Antonio Pérez Crespo	84.547
Union of the Right	CEDA-AccAgr	Francisco Roa	82.302
Union of the Right	CEDA-AccAgr	Antonio Álvarez Robles	81.566
Union of the Right	CEDA-AccAgr	Pedro Martínez Juárez	80.640
Union of the Right	A	Manuel Sáenz de Miera	80.273
Union of the Right	CEDA-AccAgr	Francisca Bohigas Gavilanes	71.830
Republican Coalition	PRRS	Félix Gordón Ordás	41.763
Republican Coalition	Ind	Publio Suárez Uriarte	41.036
Republican Coalition	AR	Gabriel Franco	37.575
Republican Coalition	PRR	Herminio Fernández de la Poza	32.264
Republican Coalition	Ind	Justino Azcárate	31.023
Republican Coalition	PRR	Ramiro Armesto	29.775
Republican Coalition	PRR	Eustasio García Guerra	27.484
Socialists	PSOE	Alfredo Nistal	34.771
Socialists	PSOE	Miguel Carro	33.787
Republican Right	PRP	Juan Castrillo	18.811
Republican Right	PRC	Francisco Molleda	6.882
Republican Right	PRP	Valeriano B. Díez Arias	6.592
Republican Right	PRC	Jesús Fernández Conde	4.679
Republican Right	PRC	Argimiro Díez Río	3.399
Republican Right	PRC	José Pinto	2.345
Republican Right	PRP	Alfredo de Zavala y Lafora	500
Independent Radical Socialists	PRRSI	Luis López-Doriga	11.527
Independent Radical Socialists	PRRSI	Alfredo Barthe	10.463
	Ind	Alberto Blanco	8.171
Communists	PCE	Victoriano López Rubio	4.323
Communists	PCE	Críspulo Gutiérrez	3.122
Communists	PCE	Arseli González	2.792
Communists	PCE	Benito Campelo	2.653
Communists	PCE	Dolores Ibárruri	2.517
Communists	PCE	Jesús Hernández Tomas	2.437
Communists	PCE	Ramiro Núñez	2.338

=== Zamora ===
6 seats. 4 votes per citizen

Alliance	Party	Candidate	1st round votes	2nd round votes
Antimarxist list	PRR	Santiago Alba Bonifaz	76.839	
Antimarxist list	A	Vicente Tomé Prieto	75.604	
Antimarxist list	A	José María Cid-Ruiz Zorrilla	73.708	
Antimarxist list	CEDA-AP	Geminiano Carrascal Martín	72.930	
Republican Right	PRC	Miguel Maura Gamazo	24.592	
Republican Right	PRC	Francisco González García (Note: Supported by the Antimarxists on the 2nd round)	15.798	73.110
Socialists	PSOE	Quirino Salvadores Sediles (Note: Supported by the PRRSI on the 2nd round)	20.305	18.196
Socialists	PSOE	José Almoina Mateos	17.580	
Socialists	PSOE	Juan Leonardo Blanco Ovejero	13.083	
Socialists	PSOE	Isabel Oyarzábal Smith	11.607	
Independent Radical Socialists	PRRSI	Ángel Galarza Gago	14.939	
Independent Radical Socialists	PRRSI	Antonio Moreno Jover	12.438	
Communists	PCE	José Salgado Luengo	2.083	
Communists	PCE	Salvador Luna	1.020	
Communists	PCE	Leonor Martínez Robles	1.011	
Communists	PCE	José García Rodríguez	998	

=== Salamanca ===
7 seats. 5 votes per citizen.

Alliance	Party	Candidate	Votes
Agrarian Right	CEDA-AP	José María Gil Robles	85.581
Agrarian Right	A	Ernesto Castaño	82.908
Agrarian Right	CEDA-AP	Cándido Casanueva	80.015
Agrarian Right	CT	José María Lamamié de Clairac	78.020
Agrarian Right	CEDA-AP	José Cimas	76.772
Socialists	PSOE	José Andrés	40.757
Socialists	PSOE	Valeriano Casanueva	36.162
Socialists	PSOE	Rafael Castro	36.142
Socialists	PSOE	Adolfo Goe	29.663
Socialists	PSOE	Rufino Martín	26.584
Liberal Democrat	PRLD	Filiberto Villalobos	40.701
Republican Coalition	PRC	Tomás Marcos	32.212
Republican Coalition	PRC	Fernando Íscar	29.235
Republican Coalition	PRR	Marcelino Rico	23.178
Republican Coalition	PRR	José Camón	16.057
Progressive	PRP	Julio Ramón	17.945
Communists	PCE	Luis Campo	4.155
Communists	PCE	José Ochoa	1.208
Communists	PCE	Rogelio Cifuentes	681
Communists	PCE	Antonio Hierro	529
Communists	PCE	Andrés González Gorjón	393

== Old Castille ==
Party	Candidates	Seats
Spanish Confederation of Autonomous Right-wing Groups (CEDA); Popular Action (AP); Riojan Agrarian Action (AAR); Provincial Agrarian Bloc (BAP); Agrarian Castilian Union (UCA)	12; 7; 2; 2; 1	12; 7; 2; 2; 1
Agrarians (A)	12	11
Spanish Socialist Workers' Party (PSOE)	21	5
Traditionalist Communion (CT)	4	3
Spanish Renovation (RE)	3	3
Republican Action (AR)	8	2
Radical Republican Party (PRR)	18	1
Conservative Republican Party (PRC)	8	1
Rural Action (ARural)	4	1
Spanish Nationalist Party (PNE)	1	1
Communist Party of Spain (PCE)	14	
Radical Socialist Republican Party (PRRS)	7	
Federal Democratic Republican Party "Barrioberistas" (PRDF)	5	
Independent Radical Socialist Republican Party (PRRSI)	3	
Federal Party "Pimargallianos" (PF)	2	
Castilianist Republican Party (PRCast)	1	
Independents (Ind)	9	
Total	132	40

=== Santander ===
7 seats. 5 votes per citizen

Alliance	Party	Candidate	Votes
Union of the Right	A	Eduardo Pérez del Molino	71.650
Union of the Right	CEDA-AP	José María Valiente Soriano	71.079
Union of the Right	RE	Santiago Fuentes Pila	70.398
Union of the Right	CT	José L. Zamanillo	68.950
Union of the Right	RE	Pedro Sáinz Rodríguez	68.616
Socialists	PSOE	Bruno Alonso	40.455
Socialists	PSOE	Antonio Ramos	36.985
Socialists	PSOE	Manuel Leiza	34.456
Socialists	PSOE	Juan Ruiz Olazarán	33.683
Socialists	PSOE	Antonio Vayas	32.273
Republican Coalition	PRR	Alonso Velarde	20.996
Republican Coalition	PRR	Isidoro Mateo	18.972
Republican Coalition	PRR	Julio Arce	17.060
Republican Coalition	PRC	Fernando Quintanal	16.292
Republican Coalition	PRC	José M. Cossío	14.367
Republican Left	Ind	Victoriano Sánchez	11.157
Republican Left	AR	Ramón Ruiz Rebollo	11.113
Republican Left	PRRS	Manuel Ruiz de Villa	9.606
Republican Left	AR	Daniel R. Ortiz	8.846
Republican Left	AR	José L. Duro	5.502
Federalists	PRDF	Jerónimo Campano	3.151
Federalists	PRDF	Manuel Sañudo	2.678
Communists	PCE	Ángel Escobio	1.727
Communists	PCE	Manuel Puente	1.630
Communists	PCE	Mariano Juez	1.484
Communists	PCE	Mariano Luis	1.291
Communists	PCE	Ángel Delgado	1.279

=== Palencia ===
4 seats. 3 votes per citizen.

Alliance	Party	Candidate	Votes
Agrarian Right	A	Abilio Calderón	62.079
Agrarian Right	CEDA-UCA	Ricardo Cortes	61.806
Agrarian Right	RE	Fernando Suárez de Tangil	59.047
Socialists	PSOE	Crescenciano Aguado	18.384
Socialists	PSOE	Manuel Muiño	17.475
Socialists	PSOE	Claudina García Pérez	16.680
Republican Coalition	PRR	Jerónimo Arroyo	12.161
Republican Coalition	PRC	César Gusano	9.489
Radical Socialists	PRRS	Antonio Pérez de la Fuente	1.461
	Ind	Carlos Alonso	1.205

=== Burgos ===
7 seats. 5 votes per citizen.

Alliance	Party	Candidates	1st round votes	2nd round votes
Agrarians	A	José Martínez de Velasco	84.466	
Agrarians	A	Tomás Alonso de Armiño	72.573	
Agrarians	A	Ramón de la Cuesta	70.405	
Agrarians	CT	Francisco Estévanez	68.037	
Agrarians	A	Aurelio Gómez González	62.862	
Republican-Socialist Conjunction	PRRSI	Moisés Barrios	19.670	
Republican-Socialist Conjunction	PSOE	Luis Labín	19.137	13.103
Republican-Socialist Conjunction	PRRSI	Gregorio Villarias	17.845	5.986
Republican-Socialist Conjunction	AR	Domingo del Palacio	16.734	
Republican-Socialist Conjunction	PSOE	Antonio Quintana	15.944	
Republican Coalition	PRR	Perfecto Ruiz Dorronsoro	18.263	11.163
Republican Coalition	PRR	Guzmán de la Vera	13.314	
Republican Coalition	AR	Claudio Sánchez-Albornoz	11.786	
Republican Coalition	PRR	Dionisio Rueda	10.311	
Republican Coalition	PRR	Jose Mingo	9.187	
Agrarian-Catholic Coalition (Note: They received the support of the Agrarians on the 2nd round)	CT	Ricardo Gómez Rojí	18.891	17.095
Agrarian-Catholic Coalition	PNE	José María Albiñana	14.987	34.946
Agrarian-Catholic Coalition	Ind	Manuel Bermejillo	12.119	
Burgalés Agrarian Action	ARural	Angel García Vedoya	16.300	24.589
Burgalés Agrarian Action	ARural	José María Moliner	15.571	
Burgalés Agrarian Action	ARural	Ricardo Olalla	9.687	
Burgalés Agrarian Action	ARural	Francisco María Melchor	8.747	
Conservatives	PRC	Luis García Lozano	15.324	6.263
Conservatives	PRC	Manuel Maura Gamazo	8.145	
Republican Candidature of Farmers	Ind	Emilio Martín Conde	1.394	
Republican Candidature of Farmers	Ind	Fabriciano Campo	1.223	
Republican Candidature of Farmers	Ind	Mariano San Salvador	788	
Castellanist Republican	PRCast	Gregorio Fernández Díez	939	
Communist	PCE	Jesús San Antonio	565	
Communist	PCE	Carlos Abad	502	
Communist	PCE	Francisco Galán	N/A	
Communist	PCE	Miguel Pérez	N/A	
Communist	PCE	Rufino Vilasante	N/A	

=== Logroño ===
4 seats. 3 votes per citizen

Alliance	Party	Candidate	Votes
Agrarian-Catholic	CEDA-AAR	Tomás Ortiz de Solórzano y Ortiz de la Puente	40.087
Agrarian-Catholic	CEDA-AAR	Ángeles Gil Arbalellos	38.286
Agrarian-Catholic	CT	Miguel de Miranda y Mareo	37.456
Republican-Socialist Conjunction	AR (Note: Supported by the Autonomous Radical Republican Party.)	Amós Salvador y Carreras	25.764
Republican-Socialist Conjunction	PRRS (Note: Supported by the Autonomous Radical Republican Party.)	Domingo Barnés Salinas	24.459
Republican-Socialist Conjunction	PSOE	José Orad de la Torre	22.672
Conservatives	Ind	Manuel Lorenzo Pardo	9.354
Conservatives	PRC	Manuel Hidalgo de Cisneros	7.183
Radical	PRR	José Eraso Esparza	6.666
Federal Democratic Republicans	PRDF (Note: The Autonomous Radical Republican Party gave PRDF candidate Eduardo Barriobero its support after PRR candidate Alejandro Gallego Benito retired from the contest.)	Eduardo Barriobero y Herrán	638
Federal Democratic Republicans	PRDF	Luciano María de Mendi y Abellanosa	231
Federal Democratic Republicans	PRDF	Salvador Sediles Moreno	182

=== Valladolid ===
6 seats. 4 votes per citizen.

Alliance	Party	Candidate	Votes
Agrarian Right	A	Antonio Royo-Villanova	69.224
Agrarian Right	A	Pedro Martín	67.212
Agrarian Right	A	Blas Cantalapiedra	66.438
Agrarian Right	CEDA-AP	Luciano de la Calzada	64.358
Socialists	PSOE	Federico Landrove	39.447
Socialists	PSOE	Eusebio González Suárez	38.158
Socialists	PSOE	Remigio Cabello	38.078
Socialists	PSOE	Víctor Valseca	37.978
Republican Coalition	PRR	Justo González Garrido	21.281
Republican Coalition	PRC	Vicente Guitarte	18.060
Republican Coalition	PRR	Ciro de la Cruz	18.006
Republican Coalition	PF	Rafael del Caño	5.104
Republican Action	AR	Isidoro Vergara	8.755

=== Ávila ===
5 seats. 4 votes per citizen

Alliance	Political Party	Candidate	Votes
Agrarian Right	A	Nicasio Velayos y Velayos	46.770
Agrarian Right	CEDA-AP	Benito Dávila	44.626
Agrarian Right	CEDA-AP	Salvador Represa	43.127
Agrarian Right	CEDA-AP	Robustiano Pérez	42.386
Republican Union of the Centre	AR	Claudio Sánchez Albornoz	33.053
Republican Union of the Centre	PRR	José Picón Meilhon	26.809
Republican Union of the Centre	PRR	Francisco Agustín Rodríguez	23.000
Republican Union of the Centre	PRR	José Palmeríno San Román Colino	22.372
Socialists	PSOE	José Francisco García Muro	19.761
Socialists	PSOE	Antonio A. Montequi	16.737
Socialists	PSOE	Alejandro Fernández Quer	14.532
Socialists	PSOE	Jenaro Artiles	14.323
Radical Socialists	PRRS	Francisco Barnés Salinas	12.430
Radical Socialists	PRRS	Gerardo Martín	4.401
Communists	PCE	Ángel González Moro	1.277
Communists	PCE	Mariano González Enamorado	1.172
Communists	PCE	Gilberto Herrero	934
Communists	PCE	Antonio García Blanco	832

=== Segovia ===
4 seats. 3 votes per citizen

Alliance	Party	Candidate	Votes
Union of the Right	CEDA-AP	Juan de Contreras y López de Ayala	32.183
Union of the Right	CEDA-AP	Mariano Fernández-Córdoba	28.571
Union of the Right	A	Rufino Cano	25.364
Radicals	PRR	Eutiquiano Rebollar	18.069
Radicals	PRR	Arturo Martín de Nicolás	17.057
Radicals	PRR	Hipólito González-Parrado	17.477
Republican-Socialist Conjunction	PRRSI	José Luis Martín de Antonio	17.144
Republican-Socialist Conjunction	PSOE	Julio Fuster	14.805
Republican-Socialist Conjunction	PSOE	Rodolfo Obregón	13.017
	Ind	Jerónimo García Gallego	10.559
Republican Action	AR	Pedro Romero	9.028
	Ind	Epifanio Onrrubia	7.149

=== Soria ===
3 seats. 2 votes per citizen

Alliance	Party	Candidate	Votes
Conservative-Agrarian	PRC	Gregorio Arranz	27.030
Conservative-Agrarian	A	Jesús Cánovas del Castillo	16.444
Provincial Agrarian Bloc	CEDA-BAP	José Martínez-Azagra	18.997
Provincial Agrarian Bloc	CEDA-BAP	Ricardo Moreno	17.155
Federalist	PF	Manuel Hilario-Ayuso	14.865
Radical Socialists	PRRS	Benito Artigas	11.818
Radical Socialists	PRRS	Luis Feced	331
Radical	PRR	José Onrrubia	8.559
Socialist	PSOE	Teodoro del Olmo	4.496

== Vascongadas and Navarre ==
Party	Candidates	Seats
Basque Nationalist Party (PNV)	17	12
Traditionalist Communion (CT)	11	6
Spanish Socialist Workers' Party (PSOE)	12	1
Spanish Renovation (RE)	3	1
Republican Action (AR)	3	1
Confederation of Spanish Autonomous Right-wing Groups (CEDA); Navarrese Union (UN)	1; 1	1; 1
Independents (Ind)	3	2
Communist Party of Spain (PCE)	14	
Radical Republican Party (PRR)	7	
Radical Socialist Republican Party (PRRS)	5	
Independent Radical Socialist Republican Party (PRRSI)	2	
Federal Republican Party "Franchystas" (PRF)	1	
Federation of Republican Centres of Guipúzcoa (FCRG)	1	
Basque Nationalist Action (ANV)	1	
Total	81	24

=== Bilbao ===
6 seats. 4 votes per citizen.

Alliance	Party	Candidate	Votes
Basque Nationalists	PNV	Manuel Robles Aranguiz	55.984
Basque Nationalists	PNV	José Horn Areilza	55.840
Basque Nationalists	PNV	Ramón Vicuña y Espalza	55.805
Basque Nationalists	PNV	Juan Antonio de Careaga y Andueza	55.780
Republican-Socialist Conjunction	PSOE	Indalecio Prieto Tuero	50.130
Republican-Socialist Conjunction	AR	Manuel Azaña Díaz	49.974
Republican-Socialist Conjunction	PSOE	Julián Zugazagoitia Mendieta	49.146
Republican-Socialist Conjunction	PRRSI	Marcelino Domingo Sanjuán	48.979
Right's Bloc	RE	Pilar Careaga Besabe	20.082
Right's Bloc	Ind	Adolfo González de Careaga y Urquijo	19.966
Right's Bloc	CT	Hermógenes Rojo Barona	19.918
Right's Bloc	CT	Luis Lezama Leguizamón y Zuazola	19.899
Communists	PCE	Facundo Perezagua	10.264
Communists	PCE	Leandro Carro	9.248
Communists	PCE	Dolores Ibárruri	7.752
Communists	PCE	Arsenio Bueno	7.685
Radical Socialists	PRRS	Fernando Valera Aparicio	1.072
Radical Socialists	PRRS	Vicente Fatrás Neira	1.004

=== Vizcaya (Province) ===
3 seats. 2 votes per citizen

Alliance	Party	Candidate	Votes
Baste Nationalist	PNV	José Antonio Aguirre y Lecube	40.053
Baste Nationalist	PNV	Heliodoro de la Torre y Larrinaga	39.508
Right's Bloc	CT	Marcelino de Oreja y Elosegui	20.123
Right's Bloc	RE	José María de Areilza y Martínez Rodas	19.458
Republican-Socialist Conjunction	AR	Ernesto Ercoreca Régil	9.674
Republican-Socialist Conjunction	PSOE	Joaquín Bustos Apoitia	9.317

=== Guipúzcoa ===
6 seats. 4 votes per citizen

Alliance	Party	Candidate	Votes
Basque Nationalist	PNV	Jesús María Leizaola Sánchez	56.449
Basque Nationalist	PNV	Telesforo Monzón	45.923
Basque Nationalist	PNV	Manuel Irujo	45.742
Basque Nationalist	PNV	J. Antonio Irazusta	45.427
Basque Nationalist	PNV	Rafael Picavea	42.636
Right's Bloc	RE	Ramiro Maeztu	32.320
Right's Bloc	CT	Antonio Paguaga	32.055
Right's Bloc	CT	Agustín Telleria	31.708
Right's Bloc	CT	María Rosa Urraca	31.618
Socialists	PSOE	Enrique de Francisco	21.596
Socialists	PSOE	Torribio Echevarría	20.435
Socialists	PSOE	Julia Álvarez	20.049
Socialists	PSOE	Federico Angulo	19.480
Republican Coalition	PRR	Juan Usabiaga Lasquibar	15.698
Republican Coalition	AR	Nicolás Bizcarrondo Gorosabel	15.333
Republican Coalition	PRF	Manuel de la Torre Eguía	12.395
Republican Coalition	FCRG	José Miguel Gomendio Larrañaga	11.901
Communists	PCE	Juan Astigarribia	2.381
Communists	PCE	Ricardo Urondo	2.363
Communists	PCE	Jesús Larrañaga	2.349
Communists	PCE	Luis Zapirain	2.272
Nationalist Action	ANV	José Imaz	2.116

=== Álava ===
2 seats. 1 vote per citizen.

Party	Candidate	Votes
CT (Note: Supported by the Union of the Right (CEDA,RE,A))	José Luis Oriol	20.718
PNV	Francisco Javier de Landaburu y Fernández de Betoño	11.525
PRRSI (Note: Supported by the Republican-Socialist Conjunction (PSOE, AR))	Félix Susaeta	4.856
PRR	Narciso Amorós	2.382
PCE	Blas Quintana	109
PRRS	César Castresana	98

=== Navarre ===
7 seats. 5 votes per citizen.

Alliance	Party	Candidate	Votes
Right's Bloc	CT	Tomás Domínguez Arévalo	89.901
Right's Bloc	CT	Javier Martínez de Morentín	79.487
Right's Bloc	CT	Esteban de Bilbao Eguía	77.714
Right's Bloc	CEDA-UN	Rafael Aizpún Santafé	76.003
Right's Bloc	CT	Luis Arellano Dihinx	72.337
Right's Bloc	Ind	Raimundo García García	72.010
Right's Bloc	Ind	José Gafo Muñiz	65.258
Socialists	PSOE	Ricardo Zabalza Elorga	21.223
Socialists	PSOE	Lorenza Julia Álvarez Resano	21.119
Socialists	PSOE	Tiburcio Osacar Echalecu	20.358
Socialists	PSOE	Gregorio Ángulo Martinena	20.158
Socialists	PSOE	Salvador Goñi	20.065
Basque Nationalists	PNV	Manuel de Irujo Ollo	15.097
Basque Nationalists	PNV	José Antonio Aguirre y Lecube	14.166
Basque Nationalists	PNV	Serapio Esparza San Julián	13.580
Basque Nationalists	PNV	Julio Echaide y Bengoechea	13.451
Basque Nationalists	PNV	Félix Izco Ayesa	13.393
Radicals	PRR	Francisco Oliver	5.897
Radicals	PRR	Fernando Romero	5.682
Radicals	PRR	Orosio Cristobalena	5.177
Radicals	PRR	Serafin Yanguas	4.864
Radicals	PRR	José María de Ubago	4.329
Radical Socialists	PRRS	Arcadio Ibáñez	2.561
Radical Socialists	PRRS	Félix Luri	2.454
Communists	PCE	Jesús Sáez	1.738
Communists	PCE	Vicente Zozaya	1.214
Communists	PCE	Augusto Urabayen	1.040
Communists	PCE	José Aranceta	909
Communists	PCE	Juan Mendola	871

== Aragón ==
Party	Candidates	Seats
Spanish Confederation of Autonomous Right-wing Groups (CEDA); Popular Action (AP)	7; 7	7; 7
Agrarians (A)	6	6
Radical Republican Party (PRR)	14	4
Traditionalist Communion (CT)	2	2
Spanish Renovation (RE)	1	1
Independents (Ind) (Note: Includes a PSOE member that presented himself withour party consent)	7	1
Communist Party of Spain (PCE)	16	
Spanish Socialist Workers' Party (PSOE)	10	
Radical Socialist Republican Party (PRRS)	9	
Independent Radical Socialist Republican Party (PRRSI)	7	
Republican Action (AR)	5	
Conservative Republican Party (PRC)	4	
Total	88	21

=== Huesca ===
5 seats. 4 votes per citizen.

Alliance	Party	Candidate	Votes according to Villa García	Votes according to Germán Zubero
High Aragonese Agrarian Action	CEDA-AP	Lorenzo Vidal Tolosana	33.243	33.276
High Aragonese Agrarian Action	A	José Moncasi Sangenis	31.487	31.308
High Aragonese Agrarian Action	CEDA-AP	José Romero Radigales	30.962	30.823
High Aragonese Agrarian Action	A	Antonio Royo-Villanova (Note: He was also elected in Valladolid, resigns in order to take his seat as a representative of that province)	28.096	28.331
Republican list	PRR	Joaquín Mallo	23.158	23.071
Republican list	PRR	Rafael Ulled	21.612	21.532
Republican list	PRR	José Estadella Arnó	20.811	20.723
Republican list	PRR	Pío Díaz	20.329	20.290
Bloc of Socialists and Republican Leftists	PRRSI	Casimiro Lana Serrate	20.758	20.836
Bloc of Socialists and Republican Leftists	PRRSI	Francisco Villanueva Oñate	17.962	17.130
Bloc of Socialists and Republican Leftists	AR	Mariano Ruiz-Funes García	16.434	16.434
Bloc of Socialists and Republican Leftists	PSOE	Arsenio Jiménez Velilla	16.084	15.954
Radical Socialists	PRRS	Servando Marenco Reja	1.861	1.785
Radical Socialists	PRRS	Lauro Castrillo Santos	1.645	1.692
Radical Socialists	PRRS	Ricardo Monreal Sus	1.527	1.528
Radical Socialists	PRRS	Marino López Lucas	862	853
Communists	PCE	Francisco Galán		327
Communists	PCE	Máximo Sánchez		291
Communists	PCE	Encarnación Fuyola		222
Communists	PCE	Emilio Maza		195

=== Zaragoza (City) ===
4 seats. 3 votes per citizen

Alliance	Party	Candidate	Votes
Agrarian list	RE	Rafael Benjumea y Burin	29.788
Agrarian list	CEDA-AP	Santiago Guallar Poza	28.861
Agrarian list	CEDA-AP	Ramón Serrano-Suñer	28.144
Radicals	PRR	Basilio Paraíso Labad	16.067
Radicals	PRR	Manuel Marraco Ramón	14.478
Radicals	PRR	Sebastián Banzo Urrea	11.598
	PSOE	José Algora Gorbea	9.994
Socialists	PSOE	Luis Viesca	6.533
Socialists	PSOE	Ernesto Marcén	6.295
Socialists	PSOE	Antonio Garulo	5.859
Republican Action	AR	Mariano Tejero Manero	6.158
Conservative	PRC	Ramón García Navarro	1.449
Communists	PCE	Benigno Santamaría	528
Communists	PCE	Victoriano Acín	508
Communists	PCE	Concepción Fuyola	502
	Ind	Enrique Manresa	36

=== Zaragoza (Province) ===
7 seats. 5 votes per citizen.

Alliance	Party	Candidate	Votes according to Villa García	Votes according to German Zubero
Agrarian Defense list	A	Mateo Azpeitia Esteban	57.390	57.257
Agrarian Defense list	CEDA-AP	Manuel Sierra Pomares	56.862	56.925
Agrarian Defense list	A	Mariano de la Hoz Saldaña	56.239	56.140
Agrarian Defense list	CT	Javier Ramírez Sinués	54.819	55.378
Agrarian Defense list	CT	Jesús Comín Sagües	54.125	54.155
Radicals	PRR	Lucas Ernesto Montes Azcona (Note: Unable to take his seat due to incompatibilities with his job)	27.003	27.014
Radicals	PRR	Mariano Gaspar Lausín	26.017	25.960
Radicals	PRR	Darío Pérez García (Note: Elected due to the incompability of Montes Azcona)	25.854	25.854
Radicals	PRR	José Valenzuela Soler	23.584	23.463
Radicals	PRR	Francisco Vives Nuín	22.217	22.072
Socialists	PSOE	Manuel Albar Catalán	24.490	22.465
Socialists	PSOE	Eduardo Castillo Blasco	22.194	22.174
Socialists	PSOE	Francisco Nieto Mora	21.695	21.623
Socialists	PSOE	Antonio Ruiz García	20.676	19.903
Socialists	PSOE	Luis Palacios Ibáñez	19.614	19.634
Republican Conjunction	AR	Honorato de Castro Bonel	16.630	-
Republican Conjunction	PRRSI	Mariano Joven Hernández	14.152	14.253
Republican Conjunction	PRRSI	José María González Gamonal	10.970	11.108
Republican Conjunction	AR	José María Lamana Ullate	10.533	-
Republican Conjunction	PRRSI	Manuel Román Hernández	8.282	8.282
	Ind	José Algora	10.234	10.301
Radical Socialists	PRRS	Antonio Guallar Poza	5.365	5.356
Radical Socialists	PRRS	Mariano Menor Poblador	3.907	3.895
Radical Socialists	PRRS	José Buil Rotellar	3.402	3.461
Radical Socialists	PRRS	Fernando Valera	1.955	2.037
Radical Socialists	Ind	Santiago García Sánchez	1.798	1.775
Conservatives	PRC	Luis Legaz Lucambra	-	706
Conservatives	PRC	Manuel Pardo Urdapilleta	-	705
Communists	PCE	Francisco Galán Rodríguez	-	570
Communists	PCE	Victoriano Acín Romeo	-	494
Communists	PCE	Cipriano Muñoz	-	462
Communists	PCE	Basilio Buil Álvarez	-	329
Communists	PCE	José María Marbellá	-	290
Anti-landowners	Ind	Federico Álvaro Vigil	-	91
Anti-landowners	Ind	Federico Lajaima Antorán	-	24

=== Teruel ===
5 seats. 4 votes per citizen.

Alliance	Party	Candidate	Votes according to Villa García
Agrarian Rights	CEDA-AP	José María Julián Gil	51.631
Agrarian Rights	CEDA-AP	Miguel Sancho Izquierdo	49.361
Agrarian Rights	A	Leopoldo Igual Padilla	44.714
Agrarian Rights	A	Casto Simón y Castillo	40.708
Popular Republican list	Ind	Vicente Iranzo Enguita	34.490
Popular Republican list	PRRS	Ramón Feced Grassa	30.601
Popular Republican list	PRR	Fausto Vicente Gella	29.324
Popular Republican list	PRR	Pompeyo Gimeno Alonso	23.229
Left Alliance	PRRSI	Gregorio Vilatela Abad	18.930
Left Alliance	PSOE	Pedro Díez Pérez	17.047
Left Alliance	AR	Luis Doporto Marchuri	14.498
Left Alliance	PRRSI	Marcelino Domingo Sanjuán	10.858
Conservatives	PRC	Enrique Mullor Quesada	617
Communists	PCE	Francisco Galán Rodríguez	462
Communists	PCE	Alejandro García	222
Communists	PCE	Manuel Saura	208
Communists	PCE	Manuel Caraso	168

== Catalonia and the Ballearic Islands ==
Party	Candidates	Seats
Catalanist League (Lliga)	35	24
Republican Left of Catalonia (ERC)	29	16
Federal Republican Party "Franchystas" (PRF)	6	4
Radical Republican Party (PRR); Federal Republican Party of Mallorca (PRFM)	35; 5	3; 2
Socialist Union of Catalonia (USC)	5	3
Traditionalist Communion (CT)	8	2
Centre Republican Party (PRCen)	2	2
Spanish Confederation of the Autonomous Right-wing Groups (CEDA); Union of Ballearic Rights (UDB)	2; 2	2; 2
Spanish Socialist Workers' Party (PSOE)	11	1
Republican Action (AR); Catalan Party of Republican Action (PCAR)	8; 4	1; 1
Regionalist Party of Mallorca (PRMall)	1	1
Union of Rabassaires (UdR)	1	1
Independents (Ind)	3 (Note: Including a PSOE member that presented himself without party support)	1
Workers' and Peasants' Bloc (BOC)	32	
Communist Party of Spain (PCE)	32	
Catalanist Republican Action (ACR)	16	
Spanish Renovation (RE)	12	
Nationalist Republican Party of the Left (PNRE)	8	
Agrarians (A)	4	
Democratic Union of Catalonia (UDC)	4	
Independent Radical Socialist Republican Party (PRRSI); Catalan Radical Socialists (RSC)	3; 2	
Radical Socialist Republican Party (PRRS)	1	
Ballearic Autonomous Right (DAB)	1	
Total	259	61

=== Barcelona (City) ===
19 seats. 14 votes per citizen.

Alliance	Party	Candidate	Votes
Esquerra Republicana	ERC	Lluis Companys (Note: Supported by the Lliga)	151.664
Esquerra Republicana	ERC	Francesc Maciá (Note: couldn't take his seat due to incompatibilities with his position as President of the Generalitat)	138.455
Esquerra Republicana	ERC	José Sunyol	134.700
Esquerra Republicana	ERC	Mariano Rubió	132.710
Esquerra Republicana	PRF	Abel Velilla	132.426
Esquerra Republicana	ERC	José Mestre (Note: Elected due to the incapacity of Francesc Maciá)	125.217
Esquerra Republicana	USC	Rafael Folch	124.864
Esquerra Republicana	USC	Francisco Viladomat	124.830
Esquerra Republicana	ERC	Hilario Salvador	124.295
Esquerra Republicana	ERC	José Riera	124.103
Esquerra Republicana	ERC	Emilio Carles	123.758
Esquerra Republicana	ERC	José Queralt	123.398
Esquerra Republicana	ERC	Narciso Guerra	122.984
Esquerra Republicana	ERC	Aurora Bertrana	122.285
Esquerra Republicana	ERC	Jesús Sanz	121.809
Catalan League	Lliga	Joaquín Pellicena	132.015
Catalan League	Lliga	Juan Ventosa y Riera	132.013
Catalan League	Lliga	Luis Puig de la Bellacasa	131.509
Catalan League	Lliga	Felipe de Solá	131.331
Catalan League	Lliga	Francesc Cambó	131.295
Catalan League	Lliga	Pedro Rahola	131.281
Catalan League	Lliga	Joaquín María Nadal	131.251
Catalan League	Lliga	Alejandro Gallart	130.828
Catalan League	Lliga	Antonio Gabarró	130.302
Catalan League	Lliga	Vicente Solé	129.980
Catalan League	Lliga	Francisco Pons	129.735
Catalan League	Lliga	José Ayáts	129.640
Catalan League	Lliga	Joaquín Reig	128.599
Catalan League	Lliga	Francisco Bastos	126.174
Catalan League	Lliga	Francisco Vendrell	108.651
Catalan Left Coalition	ACR	Luis Nicolau d'Olwer	41.179
Catalan Left Coalition	ACR	Amadeo Hurtado	38.786
Catalan Left Coalition	ACR	Martín Esteve y Guau	37.402
Catalan Left Coalition	PNRE	Antoni Xirau y Palau	37.200
Catalan Left Coalition	ACR	Santiago Guvérn	36.538
Catalan Left Coalition	ACR	David Ferrer	36.001
Catalan Left Coalition	PRF	Baldomero Tona	35.023
Catalan Left Coalition	PRF	Francisco Corbella	34.880
Catalan Left Coalition	PNRE	José Quero	32.253
Catalan Left Coalition	ACR	José María de Segarta	27.539
Catalan Left Coalition	ACR	Pedro Domingo	27.314
Catalan Left Coalition	PNRE	Joaquín Ventalló	27.053
Catalan Left Coalition	PNRE	Ramón Casanellas	26.747
Catalan Left Coalition	PNRE	Antonio Villalta	26.543
Catalan Left Coalition	AR-PCAR	Faustino Ballvé	26.145
Radicals	PRR	Alejandro Lerroux García	40.656
Radicals	PRR	Juan José Rocha	39.016
Radicals	PRR	Rafael Guerra del Río	38.840
Radicals	PRR	José Estadella	38.399
Radicals	PRR	Antonio Muntaner	38.273
Radicals	PRR	Manuel Torres Campañá	38.201
Radicals	PRR	José Mateu	37.910
Radicals	PRR	José María Serraclara	37.900
Radicals	PRR	Rafael García Fando	37.717
Radicals	PRR	Emeterio Palma	37.599
Radicals	PRR	Luis Calvo	37.456
Radicals	PRR	Manuel Mallén	37.419
Radicals	PRR	Pedro Ferreras	37.401
Radicals	PRR	Juan Carandell	37.299
Radicals	PRR	Luis Matutano	37.259
National Bloc of the Right	RE	Antonio Goicoechea	23.279
National Bloc of the Right	CT	José María Lamamié de Clairac	17.423
National Bloc of the Right	RE	Alfonso Ibáñez Farrán	16.699
National Bloc of the Right	A	José Fortuny	16.347
National Bloc of the Right	RE	José Bertrán	16.038
National Bloc of the Right	RE	Jorge Girona	16.031
National Bloc of the Right	RE	Gonzalo del Castillo	15.905
National Bloc of the Right	A	Javier de Ros	15.736
National Bloc of the Right	RE	Ramón María Condominas	15.543
National Bloc of the Right	A	Carlos Padrós	15.348
National Bloc of the Right	RE	Francisco González Palou	15.151
National Bloc of the Right	RE	Eduardo Vilaseca	14.975
National Bloc of the Right	RE	Ramón Ciscar	14.943
National Bloc of the Right	RE	Pedro Conde	14.746
National Bloc of the Right	RE	Juan Segú	14.462
Republican Action	AR	Manuel Azaña Díaz	12.102
Workers' Front	BOC	Jorge Arquer	5.745
Workers' Front	BOC	Joaquín Maurín Julia	5.637
Workers' Front	BOC	Tomás Tusó	4.607
Workers' Front	PSOE	Luis Prieto	4.530
Workers' Front	BOC	Jaime Miratvilles	4.525
Workers' Front	PSOE	Joaquín Escofet	4.472
Workers' Front	PSOE	Ricardo Neira	4.461
Workers' Front	BOC	Víctor Colomer	4.459
Workers' Front	PSOE	Francisco Durán	4.377
Workers' Front	BOC	María Recaséns	4.370
Workers' Front	PSOE	Raimundo Morales	4.353
Workers' Front	BOC	José Coll	4.352
Workers' Front	PSOE	Ramón Farré	4.331
Workers' Front	PSOE	Pedro Muñoz	4.297
Workers' Front	BOC	Pedro Bonet	4.199
Democratic Union	UDC	Manuel Carrasco Formiguera	5.403
Democratic Union	UDC	Joan Baptista Roca i Caball	2.735
Democratic Union	UDC	Luis Vila d'Abadall	2.577
Democratic Union	UDC	Emilio Codorníu	2.281
Communists	PCE	José del Barrio	2.709
Communists	PCE	Francisco Galán	2.672
Communists	PCE	Joaquín Pijoan	2.665
Communists	PCE	José Antonio Balbontín	2.654
Communists	PCE	Hilario Arlandis	2.549
Communists	PCE	Vicente Uribe	2.524
Communists	PCE	Antonio Sesé	2.488
Communists	PCE	Agustín Arcas	2.469
Communists	PCE	Avelina Ódena	2.460
Communists	PCE	Salvador González Albaladejo	2.444
Communists	PCE	Benito Montagut	2.443
Communists	PCE	Francisco Outeiro	2.443
Communists	PCE	Amparo Coloma	2.435
Communists	PCE	María Ricard	2.435
Communists	PCE	José Peñalver	2.304

=== Barcelona (Province) ===
15 seats. 12 votes per citizen.

Alliance	Party	Candidate	Votes
Esquerra Republicana	ERC	José Tomás Piera	143.624
Esquerra Republicana	UdR	José Calvet Mora	142.957
Esquerra Republicana	ERC	Francisco Senyal Ferrer	142.794
Esquerra Republicana	ERC	José A. Trebal Sans	142.746
Esquerra Republicana	ERC	Joan Ventosa i Roig	142.714
Esquerra Republicana	ERC	Josep Grau Jassans	142.710
Esquerra Republicana	USC	Jaume Comas Jo	142.518
Esquerra Republicana	USC	Felipe Barjau Riera	142.349
Esquerra Republicana	ERC	Domingo Palet Barba	142.241
Esquerra Republicana	ERC	Amadeo Aragay	142.002
Esquerra Republicana	ERC	Jaime Aguader Miró	141.838
Esquerra Republicana	PRF	Juan Ferret Navarro	141.092
Lliga Catalana (Note: Supported by the National Bloc of the Right)	Lliga	José María de Trias de Bes y Giró	132.381
Lliga Catalana	Lliga	Miguel Vidal y Guardiola	132.194
Lliga Catalana	Lliga	Francisco Salvans Armengol	131.758
Lliga Catalana	Lliga	Enrique Maynés y Gaspar	130.739
Lliga Catalana	Lliga	Fernando Casablancas Planell	130.733
Lliga Catalana	Lliga	Felipe Bertrán y Güell	130.727
Lliga Catalana	Lliga	Antonio Estivill y de Llorac	130.612
Lliga Catalana	Lliga	Francesc Tusquets i Prats	130.560
Lliga Catalana	CT	Juan Traveria y Pubill	130.472
Lliga Catalana	Lliga	Armando Carabén y Sánchez	130.198
Lliga Catalana	Lliga	Ramón Armeda y Callís	129.919
Lliga Catalana	CT	Juan Soler y Janer	129.737
Catalan Left Coalition	PNRE	Antoni Xirau i Palau	10.904
Catalan Left Coalition	ACR	Ramón Nubiola Cubill	10.609
Catalan Left Coalition	ACR	Pedro Domingo Sanjuán	9.981
Catalan Left Coalition	PNRE	Juan Casanelles Ibarz	9.837
Catalan Left Coalition	ACR	Enrique Margarit Fábregas	9.669
Catalan Left Coalition	AR-PCAR	Eusebio Isern Dalmau	9.620
Catalan Left Coalition	ACR	Augusto Matóns Colomer	9.618
Catalan Left Coalition	PRRSI	Manuel Abós Agea	9.616
Catalan Left Coalition	ACR	Juan Banús Moreu	9.612
Catalan Left Coalition	ACR	Javier Regas Castells	9.592
Catalan Left Coalition	ACR	Francesc Monplet Pruns	9.343
Catalan Left Coalition	PNRE	Francisco Salvá López	8.773
Radicals	PRR	Joaquín Fuster Siso	8.191
Radicals	PRR	Concha Penya Pastor	8.018
Radicals	PRR	Alejandro Muñóz Fernández	8.004
Radicals	PRR	Jaime Polo Otín	8.001
Radicals	PRR	Vicente Mari Pino	7.818
Radicals	PRR	Pedro Tarés Novalles	7.801
Radicals	PRR	Pedro Salvat Pie	7.773
Radicals	PRR	Eduardo Carballo Morales	7.745
Radicals	PRR	Enrique Cerdá Vallcorba	7.641
Radicals	PRR	José Ribot	7.464
Radicals	PRR	Adolfo Mas-Yebra	7.450
Radicals	PRR	Valentín Galobardes Monrós	7.336
Workers' Front	BOC	Jorge Arquet Saltor	2.758
Workers' Front	BOC	Julián Gómez Gorkin	2.537
Workers' Front	BOC	Manuel Prieto García	2.505
Workers' Front	BOC	José García Miranda	2.494
Workers' Front	BOC	Daniel Rebull Cabre	2.475
Workers' Front	BOC	José Oltra Pimó	2.464
Workers' Front	BOC	Isidro Casajuana Simonet	2.456
Workers' Front	BOC	José Tarafa Monté	2.423
Workers' Front	BOC	Pedro Mendoza Tirado	2.422
Workers' Front	BOC	Manuel Bala	2.407
Workers' Front	BOC	Eusebio Rodríguez Salas	2.364
Workers' Front	BOC	Ramón Magre Riera	2.360
Communists	PCE	Francisco Galán Rodríguez	762
Communists	PCE	José Antonio Balbontín	740
Communists	PCE	José Rodríguez Segura	732
Communists	PCE	Paulina Odina García	722
Communists	PCE	María Pallarols Guiteras	716
Communists	PCE	Margarita Abril González	715
Communists	PCE	Andrés Padilla López	714
Communists	PCE	Francisco Caballó Pallars	711
Communists	PCE	Francisco Amorós Pons	709
Communists	PCE	Enrique Dalmau Dumanic	707
Communists	PCE	Antonio Giralt Torreblanca	707
Communists	PCE	Vicente Arroyo Pérez	689
Republican Action	AR	Manuel Azaña Díaz	251

=== Lérida ===
6 seats. 4 votes per citizen.

Alliance	Party	Candidate	Votes
Union of the Right	Lliga	Manuel Florensa	53.464
Union of the Right	Lliga	Luis García-Piñol	53.079
Union of the Right	Lliga	Luis Massot	52.921
Union of the Right	CT	Casimiro de Sangenís	51.869
Esquerra Catalana	AR-PCAR	Luis Bello Trompeta	52.579
Esquerra Catalana	ERC	Epifanio Bellí	51.875
Esquerra Catalana	ERC	José Sastre	51.771
Esquerra Catalana	ERC	Fernando Zulueta	51.713
Workers' and Peasants' Front	BOC	Joaquín Maurín Juliá	5.521
Workers' and Peasants' Front	BOC	Santiago Palacín	5.201
Workers' and Peasants' Front	PSOE	José Solé Barberá	5.007
Workers' and Peasants' Front	BOC	Sebastián Garsaball	4.822

=== Gerona ===
7 seats. 5 votes per citizen.

Alliance	Party	Candidate	Votes
Esquerra Catalana	USC	Manuel Serra	63.678
Esquerra Catalana	ERC	Miguel Santaló	63.145
Esquerra Catalana	PRF	Melchor Marial	63.047
Esquerra Catalana	ERC	José Sagrera	63.036
Esquerra Catalana	ERC	José Mascort	62.495
Lliga Catalanista	Lliga	Juan Estelrich	42.465
Lliga Catalanista	Lliga	Carlos Badía	42.420
Lliga Catalanista	Lliga	Narciso de Carreras	40.871
Lliga Catalanista	Lliga	Pelayo Negre	40.534
Lliga Catalanista	Lliga	Ramón de Dalmases	38.777
Agrarian Right	Ind	Julio Fournier	10.733
Agrarian Right	CT	José M. Arauz	7.836
Agrarian Right	A	José M. Fortuny	6.800
Agrarian Right	CT	René Llanas	6.757
Agrarian Right	RE	Pedro M. de Artiñano	6.065
Workers' and Peasants' Bloc	BOC	Jaime Miratvilles	8.165
Workers' and Peasants' Bloc	BOC	Libertad Estartús	4.773
Workers' and Peasants' Bloc	BOC	Miguel Gayolá	4.310
Workers' and Peasants' Bloc	BOC	José Doménech	3.802
Workers' and Peasants' Bloc	BOC	Carmen Martín	3.796
Radicals	PRR	José M. Pou	3.803
Radicals	PRR	Pedro Huguet	3.696

=== Tarragona ===
7 seats. 5 votes per citizen.

Alliance	Party	Candidate	Votes
Citizen Union	Lliga	José M. Casabó	61.309
Citizen Union	Ind	Cayetano Vilella	61.008
Citizen Union	Lliga	José Mullerat	60.797
Citizen Union	CT	Joaquín Bau	59.755
Citizen Union	PRR	Juan Palau	57.872
Left Republican	PSOE	Amós Ruiz Lecina	51.654
Left Republican	PRF	Daniel Mangrané	48.513
Left Republican	ERC	Joaquín Lloréns	48.368
Left Republican	ERC	Juan Sentís	47.852
Left Republican	ERC	Juan Luis Pujol	47.672
Esquerres Catalanes	PRRSI-RSC	Ramón Nogués	35.205
Esquerres Catalanes	ACR	Matías Mallol	30.272
Esquerres Catalanes	ACR	Primitivo Sabaté	29.776
Esquerres Catalanes	PRRSI-RSC	Claudio Ametlla	28.616
Esquerres Catalanes	AR-PCAR	José Soronellas	27.506
Workers' and Peasants' Bloc	BOC	Julián Gómez Gorkin	1.921
Workers' and Peasants' Bloc	BOC	Pablo Padró	1.827
Workers' and Peasants' Bloc	BOC	Antonio Iborra	1.481
Workers' and Peasants' Bloc	BOC	Daniel Domingo	1.465
Workers' and Peasants' Bloc	PSOE (Note: Presented himself without party consent and as an independent)	Rafael Vidiella	688

=== Ballearic Islands ===
7 seats. 5 votes per citizen.

Alliance	Party	Candidate	1st round votes	2nd round votes
Centre-Regionalist-Right Coalition	PRMall	Bartomeu Fons	104.462	
Centre-Regionalist-Right Coalition	PRCen	Juan March Ordinas	102.340	
Centre-Regionalist-Right Coalition	CEDA-UDB	Luis Zaforteza	102.296	
Centre-Regionalist-Right Coalition	CEDA-UDB	Tomás Salord	101.731	
Centre-Regionalist-Right Coalition	PRCen	Pere Matutes	100.806	
Republican-Socialist Conjunction	AR	Francisco Carreras	31.515	
Republican-Socialist Conjunction	PSOE	Alejandro Jaume	31.476	24.999
Republican-Socialist Conjunction	AR	María Mayol Colom	29.760	
Republican-Socialist Conjunction	PRRS	Damián García del Pozo	29.250	
Republican-Socialist Conjunction	PSOE	Ángel Torrejón	29.194	
Federal Republican Party (Note: Supported by the Centre-Regionalist-Right Coalition on the 2nd round)	PRR-PRFM	Francesc Juliá (Note: couldn't take his seat due to incompatibilities with his position as the President of the Management Committee of the Provincial Council of the Balearic Islands)	27.424	47.623
Federal Republican Party	PRR-PRFM	Josep Teodor Canet	27.098	48.025
Federal Republican Party	PRR-PRFM	Docmael López	14.844	
Federal Republican Party	PRR-PRFM	Eusebi Heredero	14.806	
Federal Republican Party	PRR-PRFM	Bernat Tur	14.132	
Right-wing Assertion	CT	José Quint Zaforteza	9.959	
Right-wing Assertion	DAB	Miguel Alcón Orrico	7.176	
Communists	PCE	José Antonio Balbontín	1.167	
Communists	PCE	Miguel Llabrés	1.062	
Communists	PCE	Francisco Galán	1.034	
Communists	PCE	Ateu Martí	957	
Communists	PCE	Miguel Casanovas	938	

== Region of Valencia ==
Party	Candidates	Seats
Radical Republican Party (PRR); Autonomist Republican Union Party (PURA)	22; 13	21; 13
Spanish Confederation of Autonomous Right-wing Groups (CEDA); Valencian Regional Right (DRV); Agrarian Regional Right (DRA) (Note: One candidate of DRA didn't form part of the CEDA) (Note: Name adopted by the DRV in Alicante)	18; 15; 4	9; 6; 3
Spanish Socialist Workers' Party (PSOE)	14	3
Conservative Republican Party (PRC)	3	2
Traditionalist Communion (CT)	5	1
Independents (Ind)	10	1
Communist Party of Spain (PCE)	23	
Independent Radical Socialist Republican Party (PRRSI)	13	
Republican Action (AR)	6	
Radical Socialist Republican Party (PRRS)	4	
Radical Socialist Left (IRS)	3	
Federal Republican Party "Franchystas" (PRF)	2	
Valencianist Republican Group (ARV)	1	
Spanish Renovation (RE)	1	
Catholic Conservative Republican Party (PRCCat)	1	
Agrarian Radical Left (IRAgr)	1	
Total	128	37

=== Castellón ===
6 seats. 4 votes per citizen

Alliance	Party	Candidate	1st round votes	2nd round votes
Radicals	PRR	Vicente Carlos Figuerola	51.957	60.287
Radicals	PRR	Álvaro Pascual Leone	47.599	57.953
Radicals	PRR	José Morelló del Pozo	48.280	57.895
Radicals	PRR	Juan Calot Sanz	44.573	56.559
Union of the Right	CEDA-DRV	Ignacio Villalonga	52.783	59.684
Union of the Right	CEDA-DRV	Antonio Martí	49.462	56.875
Union of the Right	CT	Juan Granell	48.226	56.199
Union of the Right	CT	Jaime Chicharro	49.962	55.545
Leftist Coalition	AR	Francisco Casas	31.891	27.549
Leftist Coalition	PSOE	Juan Sapiña	33.678	27.281
Leftist Coalition	AR	José Royo	33.338	26.850
Leftist Coalition	PRRSI	Luis López Dóriga	34.084	26.050
Conservative	PRC	Manuel Breva Perales	16.475	
Radical Socialist	PRRS	José Castelló Soler	6.524	

=== Valencia (City) ===
7 seats. 5 votes per citizen

Alliance	Party	Candidate	Votes
Autonomist Republican Union	PRR	Alejandro Lerroux García	65.064
Autonomist Republican Union	PRR-PURA	Sigfrido Blasco-Ibañez	63.300
Autonomist Republican Union	PRR-PURA	Ricardo Samper Ibañez	63.019
Autonomist Republican Union	PRR-PURA	Pascual Martínez Sala	58.798
Autonomist Republican Union	PRR-PURA	Vicente Marco Miranda	58.286
Right-wing Alliance	CEDA-DRV	Luis Lucía Lucía	57.496
Right-wing Alliance	CT	Joaquín Manglano Cucalló de Montull	54.767
Right-wing Alliance	CEDA-DRV	Vicente Boluda Martínez	54.042
Right-wing Alliance	CEDA-DRV	Francisco Antonio de P. Quereda Aparisi	52.438
Right-wing Alliance	CEDA-DRV	Francisco Villanueva Sáez	51.891
Leftist Front	PRRSI	José Ballester Gozalvo	24.735
Leftist Front	PSOE	Andrés Ovejero Bustamante	24.248
Leftist Front	PRF	Aurelio Blasco Grajales	23.893
Leftist Front	AR	Joaquín Álvarez Pastor	23.427
Leftist Front	AVR	Enrique Bastit García	21.566
	Ind	Carlos de Sousa Álvarez	9.304
Radical Socialist	PRRS	Fernando Valera Aparicio	7.379
Communists	PCE	Francisco Galán Rodríguez	2.756
Communists	PCE	José Uribes Moreno	2.636
Communists	PCE	Miguel Guillem Puchalt	1.829
Communists	PCE	Ángel Soriano Gómez	1.788
Communists	PCE	Salvador Chardi Rusies	1.682

=== Valencia (Province) ===
13 seats. 10 votes per citizen

Alliance	Party	Candidate	Votes
Autonomist Republican Union	PRR-PURA	Vicente Lambies	112.949
Autonomist Republican Union	PRR-PURA	Vicente de Roig	110.619
Autonomist Republican Union	PRR-PURA	Gerardo Carreres	110.171
Autonomist Republican Union	PRC	Eduardo Molero	109.053
Autonomist Republican Union	PRR-PURA	José García-Berlanga	109.003
Autonomist Republican Union	PRR-PURA	Juan Chabret	108.996
Autonomist Republican Union	PRR-PURA	Julio Just	108.000
Autonomist Republican Union	PRR-PURA	Vicente Cantos Sáiz	107.837
Autonomist Republican Union	PRR-PURA	Ángel Puig	107.551
Autonomist Republican Union	PRR-PURA	Faustino Valentín	107.278
Right-wing alliance	CEDA-DRV	Luis García Guijarro	111.168
Right-wing alliance	CEDA-DRV	Fernando Oria-Rueda	102.785
Right-wing alliance	CEDA-DRV	Francisco J. Bosch	102.509
Right-wing alliance	CEDA-DRV	Julio Colomer	102.071
Right-wing alliance	CEDA-DRV	José M. Costa	100.155
Right-wing alliance	CEDA-DRV	José M. Gadea	99.966
Right-wing alliance	CEDA-DRV	Joaquín Ballester	99.800
Right-wing alliance	CEDA-DRV	Pedro Ruiz Tomás	99.785
Right-wing alliance	CEDA-DRV	Manuel de Torres	99.379
Right-wing alliance	CT	Carlos Llinares	97.846
Leftist front	PRRSI	Pedro Vargas	64.046
Leftist front	PSOE	Andrés Ovejero	62.387
Leftist front	AR	José Donat	62.268
Leftist front	PRRSI	Miguel San Andrés	61.062
Leftist front	PRRSI	Miguel Pérez Martínez	60.673
Leftist front	PRRSI	Esteban Carrasquer	60.510
Leftist front	PSOE	Manuel Molina	60.350
Leftist front	PSOE	Isidro Escandell	60.020
Leftist front	PSOE	Pedro García	59.728
Leftist front	PRRSI	Rafael Fernández Martínez Miñana	59.658
Radical Socialist	PRRS	Fernando Valera	14.153
Republican Coalition	Ind	José Manteca Roger	5.937
Republican Coalition	PRCCat	Francisco Moliner Alío	3.587
Communist	PCE	Francisco Galán	2.501
Communist	PCE	Salvador Frades	2.112
Communist	PCE	José d'Ocón	2.028
Communist	PCE	José Antonio Balbontín	1.743
Communist	PCE	Josefa Ibáñez Lambies	1.357
Communist	PCE	Vicente Sánchez Esteban	1.279
Communist	PCE	Sinforiano Ortiz	1.241
Communist	PCE	Evaristo Navarro	1.223
Communist	PCE	Eusebio García Clemente	1.212
Communist	PCE	Guillermo Valls	1.187
	Ind	Luis Donderis	1.756
Agrarian Radical Left	IRAgr	Alfredo Pérez Morera	N/A

=== Alicante ===
11 seats. 8 votes per citizen.

1st round results:

Alliance	Party	Candidate	Votes
Agrarian Antimarxist Bloc	Ind.	Joaquín Chapaprieta Torregrosa	85.294
Agrarian Antimarxist Bloc	PRC	José Martínez Arenas	80.095
Agrarian Antimarxist Bloc	RE	José Canalejas y Fernández	78.438
Agrarian Antimarxist Bloc	CEDA-DRA	Rafael Alberola Herrera	77.909
Agrarian Antimarxist Bloc	DRA	Antonio Hernández Pérez	77.419
Agrarian Antimarxist Bloc	CT	Manuel Senante Martínez	74.826
Agrarian Antimarxist Bloc	CEDA-DRA	Francisco Moltó Pascual	74.651
Agrarian Antimarxist Bloc	CEDA-DRA	Juan Torres Sala	74.040
Socialists	PSOE	Rodolfo Llopis	62.605
Socialists	PSOE	Andrés Saborit	59.125
Socialists	PSOE	Manuel González Ramos	58.392
Socialists	PSOE	Romualdo Rodríguez Vera	57.036
Socialists	PSOE	Miguel Villalta	56.937
Socialists	PSOE	Ginés Ganga	54.597
Socialists	PSOE	Salvador García Muñoz	54.433
Socialists	PSOE	Manuel Cordero	53.057
Republican Coalition	PRR	Miguel Cámara	50.001
Republican Coalition	IRS	Juan Botella Asensi	48.674
Republican Coalition	PRR	César Oarrichena Genaro	48.134
Republican Coalition	PRR	José María Ruíz Pérez Águila	46.840
Republican Coalition	PRR	Pedro Rico López	45.979
Republican Coalition	PRRS	Jerónimo Gomáriz Latorre	41.957
Republican Coalition	IRS	José Esellés Salarich	39.646
Republican Coalition	IRS	Juan Gisbert Botella	35.133
Republican Left	AR	Carlos Esplá	36.674
Republican Left	AR	José Estruch	28.575
Republican Left	PRRSI	Juan José Cremades	24.592
Republican Left	PRRSI	José Alonso Mallol	23.210
Republican Left	PRRSI	Antonio Pérez Torreblanca	22.450
Republican Left	PRRSI	Álvaro Botella	22.374
Republican Left	PRRSI	Ángel Vera	22.010
Republican Left	PRRSI	Ramiro Pedrós	17.884
	Ind	Francisco Morata	10.326
Communists	PCE	Francisco Galán	6.902
Communists	PCE	Rafael Millá	4.417
Communists	PCE	Antonio Guardiola	3.873
Communists	PCE	Francisco Gil Verdejo	3.299
Communists	PCE	Virgilio Juan	3.160
Communists	PCE	Trifón Medrano	3.087
Communists	PCE	Antonio Manresa	3.079
Communists	PCE	Enrique Peidró	3.049
Federal Republican	PRF	Joaquín Dicenta	3.683
	Ind	Juan V. Mora	2.429
	Ind	Romualdo Catalá	1.872
	Ind	Pascual Ors	1.601
	Ind	José Escudero	1.261
	Ind	Rafael Marqués	1.187

2nd round results

Alliance	Party	Candidate	Votes
Rightist-Radical Coalition	Ind.	Joaquín Chapaprieta Torregrosa	106.059
Rightist-Radical Coalition	PRC	José Martínez Arenas	105.218
Rightist-Radical Coalition	CEDA-DRA	Rafael Alberola Herrera	102.667
Rightist-Radical Coalition	CEDA-DRA	Francisco Moltó Pascual	101.995
Rightist-Radical Coalition	CEDA-DRA	Juan Torres Sala	100.565
Rightist-Radical Coalition	PRR	José María Ruíz Pérez Águila	100.252
Rightist-Radical Coalition	PRR	Miguel Cámara	100.181
Rightist-Radical Coalition	PRR	Cesar Oarrichena Genaro	99.240
Socialists	PSOE	Rodolfo Llopis	77.366
Socialists	PSOE	Andrés Saborit	77.148
Socialists	PSOE	Manuel González Ramos	76.117
Socialists	PSOE	Romualdo Rodríguez Vera	75.499
Socialists	PSOE	Miguel Villalta	75.495
Socialists	PSOE	Ginés Ganga	74.698
Socialists	PSOE	Salvador García Muñoz	70.615
Socialists	PSOE	Manuel Cordero	70.548
Radical Socialists	IRS	Juan Botella Asensi	22.523
Radical Socialists	PRRS	Jerónimo Gomáriz Latorre	19.839
Radical Socialists	IRS	José Esellés Salarich	17.200
Radical Socialists	IRS	Juan Gisbert Botella	16.597
Monarchist Coalition	CT	Manuel Senante Martínez	9.707
Monarchist Coalition	RE	José Canalejas y Fernández	9.453

== Region of Murcia ==
Party	Candidates	Seats
Radical Republican Party (PRR)	12	7
Spanish Socialist Workers' Party (PSOE)	13	5
Spanish Confederation of Autonomous Right-wing Groups(CEDA); Popular Action (AP); Provincial Agrarian Union (UAP)	7; 6; 1	4; 3; 1
Agrarians (A)	1	1
Independents (Ind)	13	2
Radical Socialist Republican Party (PRRS)	7	
Republican Action (AR)	4	
Independent Radical Socialist Republican Party (PRRSI)	3	
Federal Democratic Republican Party "Barrioberistas" (PRDF)	2	
Conservative Republican Party (PRC)	2	
Liberal Democratic Republican Party (PRLD)	1	
Total	75	20

=== Albacete ===
7 seats. 5 votes per citizen

Alliance	Party	Candidate	Votes
Republican Coalition	PRR	José María Blanc Rodríguez	75.426
Republican Coalition	PRR	Edmundo Alfaro Gironda	63.635
Republican Coalition	PRR	Román Ochando Valera	61.031
Republican Coalition	PRC	Juan Martínez Ortíz	58.105
Republican Coalition	CEDA-UAP	Pedro Acacio Sandoval	57.474
Socialists	PSOE	José Prat García	40.091
Socialists	PSOE	Esteban Martínez Hervás	38.797
Socialists	PSOE	Salvador Marbán Santos	36.414
Socialists	PSOE	Antonio Díez Martín	31.544
Socialists	PSOE	Federico Landrove Muiño	31.525
Popular Action CEDA	CEDA-AP	Antonio Bernabeu de Yeste	32.471
Popular Action CEDA	CEDA-AP	Cristóbal Gracia Martínez	28.085
Republican Action	AR	Antonio Velao Oñate	23.357
Republican Action	AR	Esteban Mirasol Ruiz	15.048
Radical Socialist	PRRS	Maximiliano Martínez Romero	7.882
Rightist list	CEDA-AP	Ramón García Quijada	5.052
	Ind	Ángel J. Yagüe Sánchez	4.564
Independent Radical Socialist	PRRSI	Rafael Selfa Mora	3.167
	Ind	Aniano Oriola Belmar	1.064
	Ind	Rodolfo Martínez Acebal	910
Communist	PCE	Justiniano Bravo	746
Communist	PCE	Agustín Angulo Villoldo	531
Communist	PCE	Antonio Palomares Parra	484
Communist	PCE	Salustiano García	450

=== Murcia (City) ===
4 seats. 3 votes per citizen

1st round results:

Alliance	Party	Candidate	Votes
Left Coalition	PSOE	Bienvenido Santos	19.114
Left Coalition	PRRSI	Norberto Pérez	18.060
Left Coalition	PSOE	Dolores Caballero	16.258
Union of the Right	Ind.	Agustín Virgili	16.941
Union of the Right	Ind	Agustín Romero	15.591
Union of the Right	CEDA-AP	Antonio Reverte	15.408
Radical Socialist Federal Coalition	PRRS	José Moreno Galvache	14.694
Radical Socialist Federal Coalition	PRRS	Luis López Ambit	13.234
Radical Socialist Federal Coalition	PRDF	Mariano Sánchez-Roca	13.146
Radicals	PRR	José Cardona	10.703
Radicals	PRR	José Pérez Mateos	10.149
Radicals	PRR	Mariano Sánchez-Roca	9.489
Republican Action	AR	Mariano Ruiz-Funes	7.083

2nd round results:

Alliance	Party	Candidate	Votes
Rightist-Radical Coalition	Ind	Agustín Virgili	28.432
Rightist-Radical Coalition	PRR	José Cardona	28.171
Rightist-Radical Coalition	CEDA-AP	Antonio Reverte	27.502
Left Coalition	PSOE	Bienvenido Santos	19.965
Left Coalition	PRRSI	Norberto Pérez	19.261
Left Coalition	PSOE	Dolores Caballero	19.039
Radical Socialist Federal Coalition	PRRS	José Moreno Galvache	18.460
Radical Socialist Federal Coalition	PRRS	Luis López Ambit	12.549
Radical Socialist Federal Coalition	PRDF	Mariano Sánchez-Roca	12.412

=== Murcia (Province) ===
9 seats. 7 votes per citizen

1st round results

Alliance	Party	Candidate	Votes
Left Coalition	PSOE	José Ruiz del Toro	58.546
Left Coalition	PSOE	Regina García	56.636
Left Coalition	PSOE	Amancio Muñoz	55.883
Left Coalition	PRRSI	Luis Biedma	55.303
Left Coalition	PSOE	Luis Lafont	54.660
Left Coalition	PSOE	Diego Abellán	54.370
Left Coalition	PSOE	Luis Prieto	53.863
Union of the Right	A	Tomás Maestre	57.845
Union of the Right	CEDA-AP	Federico Salmón	55.857
Union of the Right	Ind	Juan A. Perea	52.454
Union of the Right	CEDA-AP	José Ibáñez Martín	52.445
Union of the Right	Ind	Alfonso Torres	51.329
Union of the Right	PRLD	Tomás Arderíus	48.460
Union of the Right	CEDA-AP	José Sandoval	48.020
Radicals	PRR	Juan José Rocha	33.338
Radicals	PRR	José Cardona	26.891
Radicals	PRR	Salvador Martínez-Moya	26.581
Radicals	PRR	Dámaso Vélez	25.303
Radicals	PRC	Gaspar de la Peña	22.481
Radicals	PRR	Ángel Rizo	19.153
Radicals	PRR	Blas R. Marsilla	3.134
Radical Socialists	Ind	Gonzalo de Figueroa	23.309
Radical Socialists	PRRS	Federico López de Goicoechea	22.467
Radical Socialists	PRRS	Luis Gómez	19.860
Radical Socialists	PRRS	Juan Antonio Méndez	17.154
Radical Socialists	Ind	José Templado	16.625
Radical Socialists	Ind	Daniel Ayala	15.090
Radical Socialists	PRRS	Miguel Luelmo	13.207
	Ind	Pablo Sanz	10.259
Federals	PRDF	Antonio Puig	7.365
	Ind	Ramón Navarro	2.852
	Ind	José Guardiola	1.841
Republican Action	AR	Antonio García Alemán	1.562
Communists	PCE	Francisco Galán	1.247
Communists	PCE	Pascual Jiménez	862
Communists	PCE	Antonio Guardiola	547
Communists	PCE	Rafael Millá	471
Communists	PCE	Antonio Navarro	438
Communists	PCE	Domingo Albarracín	412
Communists	PCE	José Jover	398

2nd round results:

Alliance	Party	Candidate	Votes
Rightist-Radical Coalition	PRR	Juan José Rocha	81.033
Rightist-Radical Coalition	A	Tomás Maestre	80.095
Rightist-Radical Coalition	PRR	Dámaso Vélez	80.437
Rightist-Radical Coalition	PRR	Salvador Martínez-Moya	79.949
Rightist-Radical Coalition	Ind	Juan A. Perea	78.657
Rightist-Radical Coalition	CEDA-AP	José Ibáñez Martín	75.345
Rightist-Radical Coalition	CEDA-AP	Federico Salmón	75.228
Left Coalition	PSOE	José Ruiz del Toro	63.252
Left Coalition	PSOE	Luis Prieto	62.481
Left Coalition	PSOE	Amancio Muñoz	61.920
Left Coalition	PRRSI	Luis Biedma	61.332
Left Coalition	PSOE	Diego Abellán	61.232
Left Coalition	PSOE	Luis Lafort	47.393
Left Coalition	PSOE	Regina García	45.967
Radical Socialists	PRRS	Federico López de Goicoechea	20.104
Radical Socialists	Ind	Gonzalo de Figueroa	19.610
Radical Socialists	PRRS	Juan Antonio Méndez	1.206
Radical Socialists	PRRS	Luis Gómez	1.164
Radical Socialists	Ind	José Templado	943
Radical Socialists	Ind	Daniel Ayala	895
Radical Socialists	PRRS	Miguel Luelmo	892
Republicans	Ind	Alfonso Torres	7.607
Republicans	PRLD	Tomás Arderíus	5.080

== New Castille ==
Party	Candidates	Seats
Spanish Socialist Workers' Party (PSOE)	39	18
Spanish Confederation of Autonomous Right-wing Groups (CEDA); Popular Action (AP); Manchega Agrarian Action (AAM); Regional Agrarian Action (ARA)	17; 13; 3; 1	14; 10; 3; 1
Agrarians (A)	8	7
Radical Republican Party (PRR)	20	6
Spanish Renovation (RE)	4	2
Conservative Republican Party (PRC)	11	1
Progressive Republican Party (PRP)	3	1
Traditionalist Communion (CT)	2	1
Independents (Ind)	27 (Note: Including three candidates that presented themselves without party consent)	5
Communist Party of Spain (PCE)	38	
Independendent Radical Socialist Republican Party (PRRSI)	11	
Republican Action (AR)	10	
Radical Socialist Left (IRS)	6	
Radical Socialist Republican Party (PRRS)	3	
Federal Republican Party "Franchystas" (PRF)	3	
Liberal Democrat Republican Party (PRLD)	2	
Federal Party "Pimargallianos" (PF)	1	
Total	205	55

=== Madrid (City) ===
17 seats. 13 votes per citizen

Alliance	Party	Candidate	1st round votes	2nd round votes
Socialists	PSOE	Julián Besteiro Fernández	151.905	177.647
Socialists	PSOE	Luis Jiménez de Asúa	146.762	176.246
Socialists	PSOE	Francisco Largo Caballero	145.641	175.262
Socialists	PSOE	Luis Araquistaín Quevedo	144.651	175.893
Socialists	PSOE	Julio Álvarez del Vayo	144.243	175.965
Socialists	PSOE	Rodolfo Llopis Fernández (Note: He was also elected in Alicante. Resigns in order to take his seat as a representative of that province)	141.264	176.168
Socialists	PSOE	Juan Negrín López	140.737	176.171
Socialists	PSOE	Ramón Lamoneda Fernández (Note: He was also elected in Granada. Resigns in order to take his seat as a representative of that province)	139.577	175.719
Socialists	PSOE	Trifón Gómez San José	139.312	175.679
Socialists	PSOE	Lucio Martínez Gil	139.079	175.840
Socialists	PSOE	Anastasio de Gracia Villarrubia	137.903	175.853
Socialists	PSOE	Antonio Mairal Perallos	136.672	176.005
Socialists	PSOE	Carlos Hernández Zancajo	135.381	175.738
Union of the Right	A	Antonio Royo-Villanova	139.047	
Union of the Right	CEDA-AP	Jose María Gil-Robles y Quiñones	136.538	
Union of the Right	RE	José Calvo Sotelo	133.551	
Union of the Right	Ind	Mariano Matesanz de la Torre	133.410	171.496
Union of the Right	Ind	Juan Pujol Martínez	133.374	171.166
Union of the Right	Ind	Juan Ignacio Luca de Tena y García de Torres	132.967	167.892
Union of the Right	Ind	Adolfo Rodríguez-Jurado y de la Hera	132.575	171.483
Union of the Right	Ind	Honorio Riesgo y García	132.571	171.345
Union of the Right	CEDA-AP	José María Valiente Soriano	132.435	
Union of the Right	Ind	Francisco Javier Jiménez de la Puente	132.103	169.741
Union of the Right	RE	Antonio Goicoechea Cosculluela	131.973	
Union of the Right	CEDA-AP	Rafael Marín Lázaro	131.884	171.054
Union of the Right	CT	Luis Hernando de Larramendi	130.594	168.632
Radicals and the Republican Right (Note: Retired from the 2° round. Nonetheless, some of its candidates received several votes.)	PRR	Alejandro Lerroux García	80.908	
Radicals and the Republican Right	PRC	Miguel Maura Gamazo	76.704	
Radicals and the Republican Right	Ind	Miguel de Unamuno	75.764	16.051
Radicals and the Republican Right	PF	Joaquín Pi y Arsuaga	74.700	
Radicals and the Republican Right	PRLD	Julián Martínez Reus	74.700	
Radicals and the Republican Right	PRC	Blas Vives	68.244	15.007
Radicals and the Republican Right	Ind	José Verdes Montenegro	72.593	
Radicals and the Republican Right	PRR	Antonio Lara	74.509	
Radicals and the Republican Right	PRP	Alfredo Zabala Lafora	71.730	14.863
Radicals and the Republican Right	PRR	Gabriel Montero	71.678	14.649
Radicals and the Republican Right	Ind	Carlos Malagarriaga	68.310	
Radicals and the Republican Right	PRR	Pedro Cardona	65.143	14.256
Radicals and the Republican Right	Ind	Carlos Blanco	73.665	
	Ind	Felipe Sánchez Roman	62.560	
Republican Left	AR	Manuel Azaña Díaz	46.027	
Republican Left	AR	Adolfo Hinojar Pons	29.283	
Republican Left	PRRSI	Marcelino Domingo Sanjuán	28.716	
Republican Left	AR	Roberto Castróvido	27.665	
Republican Left	PRRSI	Francisco Barnés Salinas	20.887	
Republican Left	AR	Mariano Ruíz Funes	20.780	
Republican Left	PRRSI	Catalina Salmerón García	18.859	
Republican Left	AR	Amós Salvador Carreras	18.790	
Republican Left	AR	Leandro Pérez Urria	17.806	
Republican Left	PRRSI	José Escudero y Escudero	17.437	
Republican Left	PRRSI	Ángel Galarza Gago	16.369	
Republican Left	PRF	Manuel de la Torre Eguía	17.939	
Republican Left	PRF	Melchor Marial	17.597	
Communists	PCE	José Antonio Balbontín	14.015	
Communists	PCE	José Díaz Ramos	12.696	
Communists	PCE	Jesús Hernández Tomás	12.479	
Communists	PCE	Pedro Martínez Cartón	12.500	
Communists	PCE	Dolores Ibárruri	12.757	
Communists	PCE	Ángel González Moros	12.394	
Communists	PCE	Lucía Barón Herraíz	12.391	
Communists	PCE	Luis Cabo Gloria	12.431	
Communists	PCE	Arturo Cabo Marín	12.319	
Communists	PCE	Luis Mangada Sanz	12.438	
Communists	PCE	Pablo Yagüe	12.233	
Communists	PCE	Francisco Galán	13.643	
Communists	PCE	Manuel Eguilazo	12.513	

=== Madrid (Province) ===
8 seats. 6 votes per citizen.

Alliance	Party	Candidate	1st round votes	2nd round votes
Union of the Right	CEDA-AP	Luis Fernández Heredia y del Pozo	52.369	71.704
Union of the Right	CEDA-AP	Rafael Esparza García	52.276	71.591
Union of the Right	CEDA-AP	Javier Martín Artajo	54.418	71.571
Union of the Right	CT	Romualdo de Toledo y Robles	51.002	71.463
Union of the Right	CEDA-AP	José María Hueso Ballester	51.180	71.268
Union of the Right	RE	Emilio Alfredo Serrano Jover	49.708	71.127
Socialists	PSOE	Manuel Alonso Zapata	58.648	69.874
Socialists	PSOE	Antonio Septiem	58.172	69.811
Socialists	PSOE	Rafael Henche de la Plata	58.249	69.797
Socialists	PSOE	Eleuterio del Barrio	57.625	69.779
Socialists	PSOE	Carlos Hernández Zancajo	57.504	69.765
Socialists	PSOE	Carlos Rubiera	58.087	69.742
Radicals and the Republican Right	PRC	Juan Andrés Cámara González	29.628	
Radicals and the Republican Right	PRR	Manuel Torres Campañá	29.294	
Radicals and the Republican Right	PRR	Juan Fernández Rodríguez	27.507	
Radicals and the Republican Right	PRR	Gaspar Morales Carrasco	26.223	
Radicals and the Republican Right	PRR	Clara Campoamor	24.730	
Radicals and the Republican Right	PRC	Rafael Martín López de Loma	23.995	
Republican Left	PRF	Eugenio Araúz Bayardo	5.732	
Republican Left	AR	Luis Fernández Clérigo	5.224	
Republican Left	AR	Roberto Escribano	4.805	
Republican Left	PRRSI	Vicente Costáles Martínez	4.398	
Republican Left	PRRSI	Victoria Kent Siano	4.306	
Republican Left	PRRSI	José Luis Martín de Antonio	4.093	
Communists	PCE	Castro Delgado	4.227	
Communists	PCE	Lorenzo González	4.193	
Communists	PCE	Eustaquio de Bustos	4.168	
Communists	PCE	Pablo Togueso	4.168	
Communists	PCE	Lorenzo Gordo	4.142	
Communists	PCE	Olayo López	4.131	
	Ind	Emilio Kowalski	1.922	
Radical Socialist Left	IRS	Antonio Moral López	1.598	
Radical Socialist Left	IRS	Agustín Nogues Sardá	1.520	
Radical Socialist Left	IRS	Fernando Esteban Fernández	1.501	
Radical Socialist Left	IRS	Fernando Moltó Carbonell	1.390	
Radical Socialist Left	IRS	Alfredo León Lupión	1.378	
Radical Socialist Left	IRS	Juan Isern Romá	1.301	
	Ind	Conceso Alarios	1.225	
	Ind	Modesto Muro	925	
	Ind	Inocencio Crisol	292	

=== Guadalajara ===
4 seats. 3 votes per citizen.

Alliance	Party	Candidate	1st round votes	2nd round votes
Union of the Right	Ind	Álvaro de Figueroa y Torres	59.825	
Union of the Right	CEDA-ARA	José Arizcún Moreno	58.307	
Union of the Right	A	Cándido Casanueva y Gorjón (Note: He was also elected in Salamanca. Resigns in order to take his seat as a representative of that province)	53.153	
Republican-Socialist Conjunction	PSOE	Marcelino Martín	16.152	1.706
Republican-Socialist Conjunction	AR	José Serrano Batanero	10.978	98
Republican-Socialist Conjunction	PRP	Luis Casuso	6.885	
Republican-Socialist Conjunction	PRRSI	Ceferino Palencia	3.904	
Radicals and Conservatives	PRR	José Carrasco Cabezuelo (Note: On the second round. he was supported by the Union of the Right)	15.035	47.223
Radicals and Conservatives	PRR	Luis Barrena Álvarez de Ojeda	8.427	13.604
Radicals and Conservatives	PRC	Juan Lafora	2.965	
	PSOE	Julián Torres Fraguas	13.256	24
	Ind	Aurelio Magro	1.439	
Communists	PCE	José Martínez Andrés	1.134	
Communists	PCE	Julián Barra Moreno	1.083	
Communists	PCE	Francisco Riofrío	1.069	
	PRR	Eduardo López Ayllón	468	
	PRF	Fabián Talanquer	30	

=== Toledo ===
10 seats. 8 votes per citizen.

Alliance	Party	Candidate	Votes
Agrarian and Popular Action	CEDA-AP	Dimas de Madariaga y Almendros	116.918
Agrarian and Popular Action	CEDA-AP	Ramón Molina Nieto	115.798
Agrarian and Popular Action	CEDA-AP	Dimas Adánez Orcanjuelo	115.334
Agrarian and Popular Action	A	Constantino Vega Gregorio	115.261
Agrarian and Popular Action	A	Félix Avia García	113.587
Agrarian and Popular Action	CEDA-AP	José Finat y Escrivá de Romaní	113.334
Agrarian and Popular Action	A	Jesús Salvador Madero Ortiz Cicuéndez	112.608
Agrarian and Popular Action	A	Julio González Sandoval Mogollón	111.898
Socialists	PSOE	Fermín Blázquez Nieto	55.314
Socialists	PSOE	Manuel Aguillaume Valdés	54.912
Socialists	PSOE	José Castro	53.721
Socialists	PSOE	Ruperto Rodelgo	51.983
Socialists	PSOE	Santiago Muñoz	51.569
Socialists	PSOE	Leocadia Muñoz	48.935
Socialists	PSOE	Mariano Rojo	47.937
Socialists	PSOE	Manuel Muiño	44.898
Republican Coalition	PRR	Adelaido Rodríguez Fernández Avilés	28.517
Republican Coalition	PRR	Pedro Riera Vidal	27.405
Republican Coalition	PRLD	Hipólito Jiménez y Jiménez-Coronado	26.716
Republican Coalition	PRR	Félix Sánchez Laínez	25.398
Republican Coalition	PRRSI	Emilio Palomo Aguado	24.819
Republican Coalition	AR	Manuel Álvarez-Ugena	20.032
Republican Coalition	PRC	Agustín Conde	13.574
Republican Coalition	PRC	Samuel Ortega Corrochano	9.706
Communists	PCE	Virgilio Carretero Maenza	8.959
Communists	PCE	Cayetano Bolívar	6.426
Communists	PCE	Eduardo Blasco	5.551
Communists	PCE	Luis Cicuéndez	5.485
Communists	PCE	Pedro Martínez Cartón	5.405
Communists	PCE	Ángel Vela	5.325
Communists	PCE	Pablo Carpintero	5.290
Communists	PCE	Luis García Plaza	5.232
	Ind	Perfecto Díaz Alonso	4.601
Radical Socialists	PRRS	Luis Cano Vázquez	1.798
Radical Socialists	PRRS	Jesús Díaz Vizcaíno	1.746

=== Cuenca ===
6 seats. 4 votes per citizen.

Alliance	Party	Candidate	Votes
Agrarian Right Union	A	Joaquín Fanjul Goñi	78.305
Agrarian Right Union	CEDA-AP (Note: He'll later join the PAE)	Modesto Gosálvez-Fuentes y Manresa	72.934
Agrarian Right Union	RE	Antonio Goicoechea Cosculluela	71.278
Agrarian Right Union	CEDA-AP	Enrique Cuartero Pascual	70.993
Radicals	PRR	Jose María Álvarez-Mendizabal y Bonilla	33.164
Radicals	PRR	Tomás Sierra Rustarazo	30.603
Radicals	PRC	Eugenio Redonet	28.742
Radicals	PRR	Jesús Martínez Correcher	26.782
Left Coalition	PSOE	Pedro Chico	17.085
Left Coalition	PSOE	Carmen del Barrio	16.873
Left Coalition	PSOE	Francisco Sánchez Llanes	16.252
Left Coalition	PRRSI	Aurelio López Malo	13.831

=== Ciudad Real ===
10 seats. 8 votes per citizen

Alliance	Party	Candidate	Votes
Antisocialists	PRC	Daniel Mondejar Fúnez	108.459
Antisocialists	CEDA-AAM	Luis Montes L. de la Torre	106.330
Antisocialists	CEDA-AAM	Luis Ruiz Valdepeñas	104.554
Antisocialists	CEDA-AAM	José María Mateo Laiglesia	101.232
Antisocialists	A	Andrés Maroto Ruiz de la Vera	63.018
Antisocialists	PRC	Carlos Borrero Mendizábal	30.326
Antisocialists	PRC	Juan Baillo Manso	24.398
Antisocialists	Ind	Francisco Yébenes Martín	24.109
Republican Conjunction	PRP	Cirilo del Río Rodríguez	90.827
Republican Conjunction	PRR	Joaquín Pérez Madrigal	86.217
Republican Conjunction	PRR	Francisco Morayta Jiménez	81.289
Republican Conjunction	PRR	Enrique Izquierdo Jimeno	71.142
Republican Conjunction	PRRS	Alberto García López	12.028
Republican Conjunction	PRR	Rafael Salazar Alonso	11.922
Republican Conjunction	Ind	Fidenciano Trujillo	10.116
Republican Conjunction	Ind	Gumersindo Alberca	1.910
Socialists	PSOE	Andrés Saborit	54.186
Socialists	PSOE	Fernando Piñuela	53.793
Socialists	PSOE	Antonio Cabrera	53.773
Socialists	PSOE	Regina García	53.665
Socialists	PSOE	Antonio Cañizares	53.618
Socialists	PSOE	Narciso Vázquez	53.393
Socialists	PSOE	Marino Saiz	52.349
Socialists	PSOE	Benigno Cardeñoso	51.999
	Ind	Isaac de Lis	10.436
	Ind	Luis Quirós	2.945
	Ind	Francisco Serrano	1.218
Communists	PCE	Arroyo	>100
Communists	PCE	Peña	>100
Communists	PCE	Sánchez	>100
Communists	PCE	Agudo	>100
Communists	PCE	Carrión	>100
Communists	PCE	Gallardo	>100
Communists	PCE	Estudillo	>100
Communists	PCE	J. Galán	>100

== Extremadura ==
Party	Candidates	Seats
Radical Republican Party (PRR)	10	10
Spanish Confederation of Autonomous Right-wing Groups (CEDA); Agrarian Popular Action (AP); Agrarian Regional Right of Cáceres and Plasencia (DRAC)	6; 3; 3	6; 3; 3
Spanish Socialist Workers' Party (PSOE)	18	5
Conservative Republican Party (PRC)	2	2
Communist Party of Spain (PCE)	18	
Independent Radical Socialist Republican Party (PRRSI)	8	
Republican Action (AR)	2	
Radical Socialist Republican Party (PRRS)	2	
Independents (Ind) (Note: Includes the Coalition of Independent Leftists, composed of 4 PSOE members and 3 PRR members that presented themselves in a coalition opposed by both parties)	9	
Total	75	23

=== Cáceres ===
9 seats. 7 votes per citizen.

Alliance	Party	Candidate	Votes
Antimarxists	PRR	Teodoro Pascual	117.858
Antimarxists	PRR	Luciano Escribano	117.190
Antimarxists	PRR	Mariano Arrazola	116.425
Antimarxists	CEDA-DRAC	Fernando Vega	116.034
Antimarxists	PRR	Fulgencio Díez Pastor	115.840
Antimarxists	CEDA-DRAC	Eduardo Silva	115.341
Antimarxists	CEDA-DRAC	Adolfo Fernández Gutiérrez	115.010
Socialists	PSOE	Higinio Fernández Granado	64.282
Socialists	PSOE	Luis Romero	63.761
Socialists	PSOE	Alfredo Batuecas	63.411
Socialists	PSOE	Juan Guillén	63.410
Socialists	PSOE	Esteban Martínez Hervás	62.470
Socialists	PSOE	Enrique de Santiago	62.130
Socialists	PSOE	Ramón Quiles	61.151
Republican Coalition	AR	José Giral Pereira	10.962
Republican Coalition	PRRS	Ángel Segovia	8.106
	Ind	Salustiano Martín Hernández	2.555
Authentic Republican list	PRRSI	Antonio de la Villa	2.387
Authentic Republican list	PRRSI	Victoria Kent Siano	672
Authentic Republican list	PRRSI	Eloy Gallego	651
Authentic Republican list	PRRSI	Aurelio Alonso	599
Authentic Republican list	PRRSI	Hugo Moreno	425
Authentic Republican list	PRRSI	Alardo Prat	322
Authentic Republican list	PRRSI	Martín Casado	308
Communists	PCE	Benito Sánchez Delgado	2.051
Communists	PCE	Joaquín Pérez	1.893
Communists	PCE	Francisco Cordero	1.393
Communists	PCE	Juan Astigarribia	1.349
Communists	PCE	Fausto Jiménez	1.295
Communists	PCE	Máximo Calvo	1.225
Communists	PCE	Antonio Domínguez	1.148
Coalition of Independent Leftists	PSOE	Ángel Pedrero García	1.501
Coalition of Independent Leftists	PSOE	Juan Canales González	1.486
Coalition of Independent Leftists	PSOE	Manuel Sánchez de Badajoz	954
Coalition of Independent Leftists	PRR	Antonio Hermosilla Rodríguez	939
Coalition of Independent Leftists	PRR	Lorenzo Ortiz Iribas	905
Coalition of Independent Leftists	PRR	Miguel España Arrugaeta	896
Coalition of Independent Leftists	PSOE	Javier Carreño Martín	~200
	Ind	Amado Viera	886

=== Badajoz ===
14 seats. 11 votes per citizen.

Alliance	Party	Candidate	Votes
Radical-Agrarian Coalition	PRR	Diego Hidalgo Durán	141.942
Radical-Agrarian Coalition	PRR	Rafael Salazar Alonso	141.931
Radical-Agrarian Coalition	PRR	Antonio Arqueros Garrido	141.921
Radical-Agrarian Coalition	PRR	Miguel Barquero Hidalgo-Barquero	141.828
Radical-Agrarian Coalition	PRR	Luis Bardají López	141.744
Radical-Agrarian Coalition	PRR	Manuel Carrascal Montero de Espinosa	141.749
Radical-Agrarian Coalition	PRC	José Díaz Ambrona Moreno	141.465
Radical-Agrarian Coalition	PRC	Fermín Daza y Díaz del Castillo	141.309
Radical-Agrarian Coalition	CEDA-AP	Luis Hermida Villelgas	141.124
Radical-Agrarian Coalition	CEDA-AP	Francisco de Asís Sánchez Miranda	140.848
Radical-Agrarian Coalition	CEDA-AP	Manuel Jiménez Fernández	140.801
Socialists	PSOE	Margarita Nelken	137.928
Socialists	PSOE	Pedro Rubio	137.596
Socialists	PSOE	Nicolás de Pablo	137.333
Socialists	PSOE	Juan Sánchez Vidarte	137.023
Socialists	PSOE	Francisco Largo Caballero	136.960
Socialists	PSOE	Celestino García Santos	136.919
Socialists	PSOE	Antonio Navas	136.429
Socialists	PSOE	José Maestro	136.355
Socialists	PSOE	José Sosa	136.229
Socialists	PSOE	Lucio Martínez Gil	136.077
Socialists	PSOE	Manuel Márquez	133.424
Republican Left	PRRSI	José Salmerón García	7.777
Republican Left	PRRS	Vicente Sol	5.565
Republican Left	AR	Juan Antonio Rodríguez Martín	4.898
Communists	PCE	Ventura Castelló	2.215
Communists	PCE	Luis González Barriga	2.206
Communists	PCE	Dolores Ibárruri	2.162
Communists	PCE	Juan Astigarribia	1.882
Communists	PCE	Amalio Fatuarte	1.848
Communists	PCE	José Silva	1.846
Communists	PCE	Pedro Corraliza	1.839
Communists	PCE	Agustín Zapiraín	1.833
Communists	PCE	Gregorio Salgado	1.830
Communists	PCE	Nicanor Almarza	1.794
Communists	PCE	Daniel Ortega	1.772

== Andalusia ==
Party	Candidates	Seats
Radical Republican Party (PRR)	45	27
Spanish Confederation of Autonomous Right-wing Groups (CEDA); Popular Action (AP); Union of the Right in Granada (UDG); Union of Independent Rightists (UDI)	26; 21; 3; 2	19; 14; 3; 2
Spanish Socialist Workers' Party (PSOE)	60	17
Conservative Republican Party (PRC)	13	5
Agrarians (A)	10	5
Independent Radical Socialist Republican Party (PRRSI) (Note: It is unclear if Ángel Herráiz was a member of the PRRSI or the IRS, on these ttable, he is being counted as a member of the PRRSI)	21	3
Traditionalist Communion (CT)	4	3
Agrarian Federation (FAgr)	3	3
Progressive Republican Party (PRP)	9	2
Spanish Renovation (RE)	3	2
Communist Party of Spain (PCE)	60	1
Republican Action (AR)	11	1
Spanish Phalanx (FE)	1	1
Independents (Ind)	27	5
Iberian Social Party (PSI)	12	
Federal Party "Pimargallianos" (PF)	10	
Radical Socialist Republican Party (PRRS)	8	
Democratic Federal Republican Party "Barrioberistas" (PRDF)	8	
Radical Socialist Left (IRS) (Note: It is unclear if Ángel Herráiz was a member of the PRRSI or the IRS, on these ttable, he is being counted as a member of the PRRSI)	5	
Federal Republican Party "Franchystas" (PRF)	2	
Liberal Democrat Republican Party (PRLD)	1	
Total	338	94

=== Huelva ===
7 seats. 5 votes per citizen. 1st round results:

Alliance	Party	Candidate	Votes
Socialists	PSOE	Crescenciano Bilbao	49.173
Socialists	PSOE	Amós Sabrás Gurrea	48.704
Socialists	PSOE	Juan Tirado Figueroa	48.544
Socialists	PSOE	Ramón González Peña	47.930
Socialists	PSOE	Antonio Ramos Oliveira	47.492
Right-wing Coalition	PRC	Dionisio Cano López	46.108
Right-wing Coalition	CEDA-AP	Manuel Sánchez-Dalp y Marñón	43.624
Right-wing Coalition	PRC	Francisco Pérez de Guzmán	41.147
Right-wing Coalition	PRC	José María Jiménez Molina	40.991
Right-wing Coalition	Ind	Manuel Fernández Balbuena	39.970
Radicals	PRR	Fernando Rey Mora	32.371
Radicals	PRR	José Terrero Sánchez	32.133
Radicals	PRR	Antonio Vázquez Limón	28.573
Radicals	PRR	Rafael Pérez Tello	27.677
Radicals	PRR	Eduardo Vázquez y González Bravo	26.264
Federalists	PRDF	Eduardo Barriobero Herranz	9.592
Federalists	PRDF	Luis Cordero Bel	8.718
Federalists	PRDF	Salvador Sediles Moreno	6.748
Federalists	PRDF	José Ponce Bernal	6.269
Federalists	PRDF	Ricardo Carrillo Almansa	6.260
	Ind	Nicolás Vázquez	1.042
	Ind	Ramón Pérez de Ayala	949
Communists	PCE	José Antonio Balbontín	757
Communists	PCE	Andrés Baya Campos	449
Communists	PCE	Saturnino Barneto Atienza	445
Communists	PCE	José Roldán Márquez	405
Communists	PCE	José Jiménez Collado	260
Independent Radical Socialists	PRRSI	Victoria Kent Siano	679
Independent Radical Socialists	PRRSI	Manuel Romero Blanco	389
Independent Radical Socialists	PRRSI	Servando Aguilera García	288
Independent Radical Socialists	PRRSI	Juan Fernández Romero	212
Independent Radical Socialists	PRRSI	Alfonso Castellano Pato	209

2nd round results:

Alliance	Party	Candidate	Votes
Republican Coalition	PRR	Fernando Rey Mora	63.862
Republican Coalition	PRC	Francisco Pérez de Guzmán	62.620
Republican Coalition	PRC	Dionisio Cano López	60.914
Republican Coalition	PRC	José María Jiménez Molina	59.529
Republican Coalition	PRR	José Terrero Sánchez	57.159
Socialists	PSOE	Crescenciano Bilbao	60.137
Socialists	PSOE	Juan Tirado Figueroa	59.939
Socialists	PSOE	Amós Sabrás Gurrea	59.921
Socialists	PSOE	Ramón González Peña	59.788
Socialists	PSOE	Antonio Ramos Oliveira	59.610
Popular Action	CEDA-AP	Manuel Sánchez-Dalp y Marañón	28.426

=== Seville (City) ===
6 seats. 4 votes per citizen

Alliance	Party	Candidate	Votes
Union of the Right	CEDA-AP	Jesús Pabón	38.332
Union of the Right	A	Jaime Oriol	37.353
Union of the Right	CEDA-AP	José Monge Bernal	37.208
Union of the Right	CT	Ginés Martínez Rubio	37.155
Radicals	PRR	Diego Martínez Barrio	29.025
Radicals	PRR	Manuel Blasco Garzón	27.216
Radicals	PRR	José Rebollo	25.156
Radicals	PRR	Rodrigo Fernández García-Villa	24.886
Communists	PCE	José Antonio Balbontín	14.211
Communists	PCE	José Díaz Ramos	13.428
Communists	PCE	Saturnino Barneto	12.466
Communists	PCE	Antonio Mije	12.291
Socialists	PSOE	Florentino Alonso	8.688
Socialists	PSOE	Miguel Ranchal	8.657
Socialists	PSOE	Rafael Aparicio	7.642
Socialists	PSOE	José Madueño	7.436
Progressive	PRP	Federico Fernández Castillejo	3.580
Iberian Social Revolutionaries	PSI	Carlos Cuerda	2.824
Iberian Social Revolutionaries	PSI	Salvador Cánovas	2.690
Iberian Social Revolutionaries	PSI	Eduardo de Guzmán	2.438
Iberian Social Revolutionaries	PSI	Ezequiel Enderiz	2.315
Orthodox Radical Socialist	PRRS	Gómez Morón	141
Independent Radical Socialist	PRRSI	A. Iriarte	121
Liberal Democrat	PRLD	José María Sevilla	103

=== Seville (Province) ===
10 seats. 8 votes per citizen.

Alliance	Party	Candidate	Votes
Union of the Right	CEDA-AP	Manuel Beca	51.999
Union of the Right	Ind	Luis Alarcón	51.946
Union of the Right	CEDA-AP	José Rojas	46.083
Union of the Right	Ind	Luis Amores	45.568
Union of the Right	Ind	Domingo Tejera	42.798
Union of the Right	CEDA-AP	José L. Illanes	39.249
Union of the Right	A	José Rodríguez Buiza-Dana	35.985
Union of the Right	CT	Juan Díaz Custodio	31.667
Republican Coalition	PRC	Miguel García Bravo-Ferrer	42.584
Republican Coalition	PRR	Ramón González-Sicilia	42.414
Republican Coalition	PRR	José González Fernández-Bandera	41.771
Republican Coalition	PRR	José González Navas	41.583
Republican Coalition	PRR	Manuel Mateos	41.368
Republican Coalition	PRR	Antonio Centeno	33.073
Republican Coalition	PRRS	Manuel Sánchez	31.980
Republican Coalition	Ind	José Huesca	31.058
Republican-Socialist Conjunction	PSOE	Mariano Moreno	31.293
Republican-Socialist Conjunction	PSOE	José Moya	30.155
Republican-Socialist Conjunction	PSOE	Gabriel Morón	29.991
Republican-Socialist Conjunction	PSOE	Agustín León	29.558
Republican-Socialist Conjunction	PSOE	José Piqueras	29.305
Republican-Socialist Conjunction	PSOE	José Aceituno	28.322
Republican-Socialist Conjunction	PRF	Justo Feria	24.581
Republican-Socialist Conjunction	PRRSI	José Pérez Míguez	23.811
Progressives	PRP	Federico Fernández Castillejo	12.670
Progressives	PRP	José López Cuesta	7.514
Communists	PCE	Víctor Sotillo	8.136
Communists	PCE	Manuel Roldán	5.975
Communists	PCE	Manuel Mateo	5.556
Communists	PCE	José Arispón	5.287
Communists	PCE	Manuel Morillo	5.112
Communists	PCE	Ana Parra	5.070
Communists	PCE	Antonio Rexach	4.950
Communists	PCE	Francisco Garrido	4.889
Republican Action	AR	Manuel Pérez Jofre-Villegas	5.869
Republican Action	AR	Manuel Ramos	3.649
Iberian Social Revolutionaries	PSI	Carlos Cuerda	5.061
Iberian Social Revolutionaries	PSI	José M. Piaya	4.179
Iberian Social Revolutionaries	PSI	Domingo Navarro	4.079
Iberian Social Revolutionaries	PSI	Eduardo de Guzmán	3.991
Iberian Social Revolutionaries	PSI	Ricardo Baroja	3.701
Iberian Social Revolutionaries	PSI	Ezequiel Enderiz	3.698
Iberian Social Revolutionaries	PSI	Salvador Cánovas	3.553
Iberian Social Revolutionaries	PSI	José Gallardo	3.427
	Ind	Manuel Olmedo	3.076

=== Córdoba ===
13 seats. 10 votes per citizen.

1st round results:

Alliance	Party	Candidate	Votes
Coalition of Rightists and Agrarians	CEDA-AP	José de Medina Togores	79.866
Coalition of Rightists and Agrarians	Ind	José Tomás Valverde Castilla	78.441
Coalition of Rightists and Agrarians	CEDA-AP	Laureano Fernández Martos	77.628
Coalition of Rightists and Agrarians	CEDA-AP	Miguel Cabrera Castro	77.486
Coalition of Rightists and Agrarians	A	Antonio Navajas Moreno	75.664
Coalition of Rightists and Agrarians	A	José Montero Tirado	75.337
Coalition of Rightists and Agrarians	PRC	Antonio Herruzo Martos	74.000
Coalition of Rightists and Agrarians	PRC	Félix Moreno Ardanuy	72.668
Coalition of Rightists and Agrarians	A	José Navarro González de Canales	71.901
Coalition of Rightists and Agrarians	Ind	Rafael Mir de las Heras	68.789
Socialists	PSOE	Manuel Cordero	69.016
Socialists	PSOE	Wenceslao Carrillo	68.902
Socialists	PSOE	Hermenegildo Casas	68.391
Socialists	PSOE	Luis García Pérez	68.090
Socialists	PSOE	José Castro	68.024
Socialists	PSOE	Francisco Azorín	67.966
Socialists	PSOE	Fernando Vázquez Ocaña	67.722
Socialists	PSOE	Adolfo Moreno	67.364
Socialists	PSOE	Julián Torres	66.157
Socialists	PSOE	Manuel Castro	65.969
Republican Coalition	PRR	José Luna Gañan	54.158
Republican Coalition	PRR	Joaquín de Pablo-Blanco Torres	53.539
Republican Coalition	PRP	Federico Fernández Castillejo	53.135
Republican Coalition	PRR	Eloy Vaquero Cantillo	52.603
Republican Coalition	PRR	Alejandro Lerroux García	49.926
Republican Coalition	PRP	José Tomás Rubio Chavarrí	48.697
Republican Coalition	PRP	Luis Pallarés Delsors	48.467
Republican Coalition	Ind	Francisco Amián Gómez	48.123
Republican Coalition	Ind	Francisco de Paula Salinas Diéguez	47.665
Republican Coalition	Ind	José Carreira Ramírez	45.465
Communists	PCE	José Antonio Balbontín	27.183
Communists	PCE	Joaquín García Hidalgo	26.392
Communists	PCE	Adriano Romero	26.253
Communists	PCE	Nemesio Pozuelo	25.762
Communists	PCE	José Díaz Ramos	25.678
Communists	PCE	José Mije	25.586
Communists	PCE	Ramiro Roses	25.247
Communists	PCE	Alfonso Ruíz Diéguez	25.174
Communists	PCE	Bautista Garcet	25.136
Communists	PCE	Manuel Hurtado	24.518
Republican Left	PRRSI	Manuel Ruiz Maya	8.630
Republican Left	PRRSI	Antonio Jaén	8.337
Republican Left	AR	Luis Muñoz	7.866
Republican Left	AR	Javier Tubio	7.572
Republican Left	AR	José Guerra	7.289
Republican Left	PRRSI	Ramón Rubio	7.127
Republican Left	Ind	Antonio Romero	6.833
Republican Left	Ind	Fernando Ferri	6.804
Republican Left	PRF	Francisco Gómez Ayala	6.770
Republican Left	PRRSI	José Almagro	6.016
Federals	PF	Manuel Hilario-Ayuso	1.907
Federals	PF	Diego López Cubero	1.041
Federals	PF	Agustín Jiménez-Castellanos	829
Federals	PF	Joaquín Rocamora	821
Federals	PF	José Merino	808
Federals	PF	Juan M. Millán	800
Federals	PF	José Jurado	793
Federals	PF	José Durán	763
Federals	PF	José M. Millán	731
Federals	PF	Rafael López Romero	723
	Ind	Modesto García Almansa	1.602

2nd round results:

Alliance	Party	Candidate	Votes
Antimarxist Coalition	PRP	Federico Fernández Castillejo	130.049
Antimarxist Coalition	CEDA-AP	Miguel Cabrera Castro	129.658
Antimarxist Coalition	PRP	José Tomás Rubio Chavarri	129.443
Antimarxist Coalition	PRR	Eloy Vaquero Cantillo	129.255
Antimarxist Coalition	CEDA-AP	Laureano Fernández Martos	128.358
Antimarxist Coalition	A	Antonio Navajas Moreno	128.336
Antimarxist Coalition	CEDA-AP	José de Medina Togores	128.302
Antimarxist Coalition	PRR	Joaquín de Pablo-Blanco Torres	128.221
Antimarxist Coalition	A	José Montero Tirado	127.990
Antimarxist Coalition	Ind	Francisco de Paula Salinas Diéguez	127.754
Socialists	PSOE	Hermenegildo Casas	85.121
Socialists	PSOE	Adolfo Moreno	83.752
Socialists	PSOE	Fernando Vázquez	82.231
Socialists	PSOE	Manuel Castro	81.380
Socialists	PSOE	Wenceslao Carrillo	81.139
Socialists	PSOE	Manuel Cordero	81.095
Socialists	PSOE	Francisco Azorín	81.007
Socialists	PSOE	José Castro Taboada	80.753
Socialists	PSOE	Julián Torres	80.708
Socialists	PSOE	Luis García Pérez	80.493
Communists	PCE	José Antonio Balbontín	15.753
Communists	PCE	Adriano Romero	14.750
Communists	PCE	José Díaz Ramos	14.670
Communists	PCE	José Mije	14.664
Communists	PCE	Bautista Garcet	14.422
Communists	PCE	Manuel Hurtado	14.401
Communists	PCE	Nemesio Pozuelo	14.391
Communists	PCE	Alfonso Ruiz Diéguez	13.492
Communists	PCE	Ramiro Roses	13.452
Communists	PCE	Joaquín García-Hidalgo	11.756

=== Cádiz ===
11 seats. 8 votes per citizen

Alliance	Party	Candidate	Votes
Agrarian and Citizen's Union	Ind	José María Pemán y Pemartín	49.497
Agrarian and Citizen's Union	FE	José Antonio Primo de Rivera y Saez de Heredia	49.028
Agrarian and Citizen's Union	RE	Ramón de Carranza y Fernández de la Reguera	48.567
Agrarian and Citizen's Union	CEDA-UDI	Carlos Núñez Manso	47.376
Agrarian and Citizen's Union	CT	Miguel Martínez de Pinillos	47.299
Agrarian and Citizen's Union	RE	Francisco Moreno Herrera	46.986
Agrarian and Citizen's Union	CEDA-UDI	Manuel García Atance	46.719
Agrarian and Citizen's Union	CT	Juan José Palomo Jiménez	46.362
Left Coalition	PSOE	Manuel Muñoz Martínez	26.899
Left Coalition	PRRSI	Francisco Aguado	26.474
Left Coalition	PSOE	Juan Campos	26.006
Left Coalition	PRRSI	Santiago Pérez	25.984
Left Coalition	AR	Antonio Suffo	25.950
Left Coalition	PSOE	Antonio Roma	25.731
Left Coalition	PSOE	Rafael Calbo	25.370
Left Coalition	PSOE	Alfonso Vega	22.626
Republican Coalition	PRR	Santiago Rodríguez Piñero	23.400
Republican Coalition	PRR	Juan Manuel Sánchez Caballero	21.327
Republican Coalition	PRC	Enrique Bernal	20.400
Republican Coalition	PRRS	Fernando Valera Aparicio	20.281
Republican Coalition	PRR	Antonio T. Cervilla	19.611
Republican Coalition	PRR	Manuel Escandón	19.403
Republican Coalition	PRR	Antonio González Rojas	18.840
Republican Coalition	PRR	José Moreno	18.727
Communists	PCE	Daniel Ortega	4.154
Communists	PCE	Manuel Hurtado	3.812
Communists	PCE	Francisco Ramírez	3.791
Communists	PCE	Francisco Garrido	3.790
Communists	PCE	Julián Pinto	3.760
Communists	PCE	Andrés Bonilla	2.923
Communists	PCE	Micaela de Castro	2.822
Communists	PCE	José Sánchez Barrios	2.658
Progressives	PRP	Julio Ramos	1.551

=== Malaga (City) ===
4 seats. 3 votes per citizen.

1st round results:

Alliance	Party	Candidate	Votes
Communists	PCE	Cayetano Bolívar Escribano	18.519
Communists	PCE	César Falcón	10.256
Communists	PCE	Concepción López Mesa	9.658
Socialists	PSOE	Antonio Fernández Bolaños	15.347
Socialists	PSOE	Eduardo Bonilla	9.604
Socialists	PSOE	Antonio Quintana	7.781
Right-wing Agrarian Union	CEDA-AP	Emilio Hermida Rodríguez	12.250
Right-wing Agrarian Union	CEDA-AP	Adolfo Gross Príes	11.603
Right-wing Agrarian Union	Ind	Álvaro Alcalá Galiano	11.302
Radicals	PRR	Pedro Armasa Briales	11.282
Radicals	PRR	Juan Antonio López	10.792
Radicals	Ind	Francisco Saval Moris	8.912
Independent Radical Socialist	PRRSI	Aurelio Ramos Acosta	7.571
Autonomous Federalists	PRDF	Salvador Sediles	1.432
Autonomous Federalists	PRDF	Belén Sarraga	1.117
Autonomous Federalists	PRDF	Antonio Merino	795
Radical Socialist Left	IRS	Eduardo Ortega y Gasset	257
Conservative	PRC	Gerardo de Villegas y Palacion	N/A

2nd round results:

Alliance	Party	Candidate	Results
Sole Antifascist Front	PRRSI	Aurelio Ramos Acosta	30.038
Sole Antifascist Front	PSOE	Antonio Fernández Bolaños	29.975
Sole Antifascist Front	PCE	Cayetano Bolívar Escribano	29.898
Agrarian Radical Coalition	PRR	Pedro Armasa Briales	21.246
Agrarian Radical Coalition	CEDA-AP	Emilio Hermida Rodríguez	21.232
Agrarian Radical Coalition	CEDA-AP	Adolfo Gross Príes	20.930

=== Malaga (Province) ===
8 seats. 6 votes per citizen. 1st round results:

Alliance	Party	Candidate	Votes
Radicals	PRR	Eduardo Frápolli	42.403
Radicals	PRR	Francisco Burgos	35.730
Radicals	PRR	Diego Martín	34.632
Radicals	PRR	José Martín	29.871
Radicals	PRR	Manuel Montero	27.075
Radicals	PRR	José María Roldán	20.790
Socialists	PSOE	Antonio García Prieto	38.974
Socialists	PSOE	Benito Luna	37.831
Socialists	PSOE	Antonio Acuña	37.808
Socialists	PSOE	Juan Villalba	37.796
Socialists	PSOE	José López Rosas	36.640
Socialists	PSOE	José Molina	34.361
Right-wing Agrarian Union	A	José María Hinojosa	34.711
Right-wing Agrarian Union	CEDA-AP	Ángel Fernández Ruano	34.409
Right-wing Agrarian Union	CEDA-AP	Bernardo Laude	29.142
Right-wing Agrarian Union	CEDA-AP	Carlos Palanca	22.102
Right-wing Agrarian Union	RE	Agustín Cabeza de Vaca	21.750
Right-wing Agrarian Union	Ind	José Méndez García	18.151
Republican Left	AR	Enrique Ramos y Ramos	14.362
Republican Left	PRRSI	Emilio Baeza	13.099
Communists	PCE	José Ochoa	3.944
Communists	PCE	José Lara	3.544
Communists	PCE	Rodrigo Lara	2.979
Communists	PCE	Agustín Campos	2.366
Communists	PCE	José Cañas	2.315
Communists	PCE	José Muñoz	2.045
Conservatives	PRC	Bartolomé Molina	2.778
Conservatives	PRC	Jaime Lanne	1.319
Andalusian Republican Left	PRRS	Leocadio Pérez de Vargas	1.386
Andalusian Republican Left	IRS	Eduardo Ortega y Gasset	1.016
Andalusian Republican Left	IRS	Juan Botella Asensi	770
Andalusian Republican Left	Ind	Blas Infante Pérez	574
Andalusian Republican Left	PRRS	José Sánchez Castillo	357
Andalusian Republican Left	IRS	Antonio Moral López	141

2nd round results:

Alliance	Party	Candidate	Votes
Radical-Cedist Coalition	PRR	Eduardo Frápolli	73.447
Radical-Cedist Coalition	PRR	José Martín	73.249
Radical-Cedist Coalition	PRR	Diego Martín	72.375
Radical-Cedist Coalition	CEDA-AP	Bernardo Laude	72.192
Radical-Cedist Coalition	PRR	Francisco Burgos	72.070
Radical-Cedist Coalition	CEDA-AP	Ángel Fernández Ruano	71.882
Socialists	PSOE	Benito Luna	41.845
Socialists	PSOE	Antonio Acuña	40.933
Socialists	PSOE	José López Rosas	40.876
Socialists	PSOE	Antonio García Prieto	40.793
Socialists	PSOE	José Molina	40.704
Socialists	PSOE	Juan Villalba	40.508
Republican Action	AR	Enrique Ramos y Ramos	1.071

=== Jaén ===
13 seats. 10 votes per citizen.

Alliance	Party	Candidate	Votes
Republican-Agrarian Bloc	PRR	Nicolás Alcalá Espinosa	142.407
Republican-Agrarian Bloc	PRC	Enrique del Castillo Folache	142.047
Republican-Agrarian Bloc	PRR	Miguel Cabanellas Ferrer	142.007
Republican-Agrarian Bloc	FAgr	José Cos Serrano	141.947
Republican-Agrarian Bloc	FAgr	José Blanco Rodríguez	141.821
Republican-Agrarian Bloc	CEDA-AP	José A. Palanca Martínez Fortún	140.431
Republican-Agrarian Bloc	FAgr	León Carlos Álvarez Lara	140.116
Republican-Agrarian Bloc	PRR	José Pérez de Rozas y Masdeu	140.083
Republican-Agrarian Bloc	PRC	Genaro Navarro López	139.601
Republican-Agrarian Bloc	CEDA-AP	José Moreno Torres	139.491
Socialists	PSOE	Jerónimo Bujeda Muñoz	113.519
Socialists	PSOE	Tomás Álvarez Angulo	13.146
Socialists	PSOE	Juan Lozano Ruiz	113.111
Socialists	PSOE	Alejandro Peris Caruana	112.638
Socialists	PSOE	Enrique de Francisco Jiménez	112.544
Socialists	PSOE	José López Quero	112.300
Socialists	PSOE	Enrique Esbrí Fernández	112.142
Socialists	PSOE	Andrés Domingo Martínez	111.933
Socialists	PSOE	Manuel Barrios Jiménez	111.756
Socialists	PSOE	Isabel Oyarzabal de Palencia	111.528
	Ind	José de Acuña	13.851
Communists	PCE	Cristóbal Valenzuela Ortega	5.180
Communists	PCE	Antonio Rexach Fernández	5.152
Communists	PCE	Vicente Uribe Galdeano	5.104
Communists	PCE	Juan J. Feijóo Fernández	5.043
Communists	PCE	Manuel Roldán Jiménez	4.993
Communists	PCE	Manuel Garrido Contrera	4.965
Communists	PCE	José Sánchez de la Torre	4.941
Communists	PCE	Juan Pérez Garrido	4.906
Communists	PCE	José Gallego Mentiel	4.889
Communists	PCE	Pedro Martínez Gallego	4.889
Progressives	PRP	Miguel Pastor Orozco	75

=== Granada ===
13 seats. 10 votes per citizen.

Alliance	Party	Candidate	Votes
Radicals and Rightists	PRR	José Pareja Yébenes	124.303
Radicals and Rightists	PRR	Juan Félix Sanz Blanco	123.062
Radicals and Rightists	PRR	José Cazorla Salcedo	122.254
Radicals and Rightists	A	Manuel de la Chica Damas	122.132
Radicals and Rightists	PRR	Francisco Roca Yébenes	121.991
Radicals and Rightists	CEDA-UDG	Julio Moreno Dávila	121.699
Radicals and Rightists	A	Rafael Montes Díaz	121.400
Radicals and Rightists	CEDA-UDG	Ramón Ruiz Alonso	121.114
Radicals and Rightists	PRR	Enrique Jiménez Molinero	121.050
Radicals and Rightists	CEDA-UDG	Carlos Morenilla Blanes	120.754
Socialists	PSOE	Fernando de los Ríos Urruti	95.570
Socialists	PSOE	María Lejárraga García	93.585
Socialists	PSOE	Ramón Lamoneda Fernández	93.389
Socialists	PSOE	Pascual Tomás	93.372
Socialists	PSOE	Juan Carreño	93.311
Socialists	PSOE	Pablo Cortés	92.788
Socialists	PSOE	Narciso González Cervera	92.364
Socialists	PSOE	Francisco Menoyo	92.335
Socialists	PSOE	Rafael Sánchez Roldán	92.073
Socialists	PSOE	Nicolás Jiménez Molina	88.608
Republican Coalition	Ind	Juan J. Santacruz	13.493
Republican Coalition	PRRS	José Álvarez Cienfuegos	7.588
Republican Coalition	PRRS	Francisco Sánchez Chacón	6.741
Republican Coalition	AR	Joaquín García Labella	6.165
Republican Coalition	AR	Francisco Rubio	5.182
Independent Radical Socialists	PRRSI	Miguel Rodríguez Molina	5.105
Independent Radical Socialists	PRRSI	Luis López Dóriga	1.911
Independent Radical Socialists	PRRSI	Pedro del Castillo	1.113

=== Almería ===
7 seats. 5 votes per citizen

Alliance	Party	Candidate	Votes according to Villa García	Votes according to López López
Union of the Right	CEDA-AP	Lorenzo Gallardo	48.501	48.595
Union of the Right	CEDA-AP	Luis Jiménez Canga	48.229	48.593
Union of the Right	CEDA-AP	Andrés Cassinello	39.457	39.428
Union of the Right	Ind	Cayetano Suárez	30.013	29.935
Union of the Right	CEDA-AP	Emilio Jimeno	24.496	24.384
Republican Coalition	PRR	Antonio Tuñón de Lara	45.608	44.498
Republican Coalition	AR	Augusto Barcia Trelles	44.394	43.471
Republican Coalition	PRR	Matías Seguí	38.418	37.697
Republican Coalition	PRR	Francisco Vega de la Iglesia	34.683	33.915
Republican Coalition	AR	Nicolás Frías	29.618	29.449
Socialists	PSOE	Gabriel Pradal	34.857	33.889
Socialists	PSOE	Ernesto Navarro	27.585	26.996
Socialists	PSOE	Joaquín Alonso	24.440	24.016
Socialists	PSOE	Félix de Pablo	22.074	21.519
Socialists	PSOE	José Asenjo	21.006	20.160
Conservatives	PRC	Rogelio Pérez de Burgos	13.380	13.557
Independent Radical Socialists	PRRSI	Miguel Granados	9.520	8.093
Independent Radical Socialists	PRRSI	Francisco de Burgos	6.596	N/A
Independent Radical Socialists	PRRSI/IRS (Note: According to López López, he was a member of the IRS. Villa García states he was a member of the PRRSI)	Ángel Herráiz	2.461	2.152
Communists	PCE	Federico Molero	8.478	7.862
Communists	PCE	Justiniano Bravo	3.415	3.237
Communists	PCE	Tomás Rodríguez	1.892	1.827
Communists	PCE	Juan García Maturana	1.734	1.736
Communists	PCE	Juan Cantero	1.541	1.532
Radical Socialist	PRRS	José Enciso	4.053	4.167
	Ind	Simón Núñez Maturana	1.754	2.089

=== Ceuta ===
1 seat

Party	Candidate	1st round votes	2nd round votes
PRR	Tomás Peire Cabaleiro	2.258	3.846
PSOE	Manuel Martínez Pedroso	2.460	2.977
CEDA-AP	Trinidad Matres	1.299	
IRS	José Alberola	269	
Ind	Marroquí José Figuerola	118	

=== Melilla ===
1 seat

Party	Candidate	1st round votes	2nd round votes
PRR-PUR	Carlos Echeguren	3.494	4.619
PSOE	Ángel Gómez Mullor	3.461	4.273
Ind (Note: Candidate from the Union of the Right (CEDA, CT, RE))	José Sanjurjo	2.696	
PCE	Cristóbal Núñez	111	

== Canary Islands ==
Party	Candidates	Seats
Republican Radical Party (PRR); Tinerfeño Republican Party (PRT)	9; 6	8; 5
Agrarians (A)	2	2
Spanish Confederation of Autonomous Right-wing Groups (CEDA); Popular Action (AP)	3; 3	1; 1
Spanish Socialist Workers' Party (PSOE)	4	
Federal Republican Party "Franchystas" (PRF)	2	
Communist Party of Spain (PCE)	2	
Spanish Renovation (RE)	1	
Radical Socialist Republican Party (PRRS)	1	
Republican Action (AR)	1	
Workers and Peasant's Bloc (BOC)	1	
Traditionalist Communion (CT)	1	
Independents (Ind)	2 (Note: Including a socialist that presented himself without party support)	
Total	29	11

=== Las Palmas ===
5 seats. 4 votes per citizen

Alliance	Party	Candidate	Votes
Radicals and Agrarians	A	José Mesa López (Note: Supported by CT)	44.833
Radicals and Agrarians	PRR	Rafael Guerra del Río	44.696
Radicals and Agrarians	PRR	José Lorenzo Pardo	42.636
Radicals and Agrarians	PRR	Camilo Martinón	42.564
Radicals and Agrarians	A	Ruperto González Negrín (Note: Supported by CT)	42.170
Socialist-Federal Coalition	PRF	José Franchy y Roca	19.211
Socialist-Federal Coalition	PRF	Bernardino Valle y Gracia	17.723
Socialist-Federal Coalition	PSOE	Juan Negrín López	16.928
Socialist-Federal Coalition	PSOE	Antonio González Medina	16.829
	Ind	Antonio Betancort Suárez (Note: Supported by CT)	3.848
Traditionalist Communion	CT	Ignacia de Lara Henríquez	~270

=== Santa Cruz de Tenerife ===
6 seats. 4 votes per citizen.

Alliance	Party	Candidate	Votes
Tinerfeño Republicans	PRR-PRT	Antonio Lara Zarate	32.718
Tinerfeño Republicans	PRR-PRT	Alonso Pérez Díaz	30.108
Tinerfeño Republicans	PRR-PRT	Rubens Marichal	29.874
Tinerfeño Republicans	PRR-PRT	Andrés Orozco	28.837
Tinerfeño Republicans	PRR-PRT	Elfidio Alonso	26.704
Tinerfeño Republicans	PRR-PRT	José María Benítez Toledo	13.512
Union of the Right	CEDA-AP	Tomás Cruz García	24.863
Union of the Right	CEDA-AP	José Miguel de Sotomayor	24.623
Union of the Right	RE	Manuel Delgado Barreto	22.533
Union of the Right	CEDA-AP	Humberto Darias Montesinos	20.683
Left Cartel	PSOE	Fernando Ascanio Armas (Note: Supported by the PCE and the BOC)	13.814
Left Cartel	PSOE	Emilio Díaz Castro	13.499
Left Cartel	PRRS	Luis Rodríguez Figueroa	13.422
Left Cartel	AR	Joaquín Fernández Pajares	7.502
Sole Workers and Peasant's Front	BOC	Domingo González Cabrera	4.678
Sole Workers and Peasant's Front	PCE	Jose Miguel Pérez	3.740
Sole Workers and Peasant's Front	PCE	José Suárez Cabral	1.218
	PSOE	Lucio Illada	1.329

== Bibliography ==
- Villa García, Roberto (2011). La República en las Urnas. El Despertar de la Democracia en España. Marcial Pons Ediciones de Historia. ISBN 978-84-9282-051-1.
- Gil Pecharromán, Julio (1997). La Segunda República. Esperanzas y frustraciones. Historia 16. ISBN 84-7679-319-7.
- Jimeno Jurío, José María (2007). Navarra en la época moderna y contemporánea. Pamplona: Pamiela. ISBN 978-84-7681-457-4.
- Palacios Bañuelos, Luis (1981). Elecciones en Burgos 1931-1936. El Partido Nacionalista Español. Universidad Complutense. Publicaciones de la Cátedra de Historia Contemporánea de España. 84-300-1447-1.
- Germán Zubero, Luis (2019). Elecciones y Partidos Políticos en Aragón durante la Segunda República. Estructura Económica y Comportamiento Político (PDF). Universidad de Zaragoza. Archived from the original (PDF) on 5 September 2025.
- Vasco, G. (2025). Basque Administration Web Portal. Euskadi.eus. https://www.euskadi.eus/informacion/resultados-segunda-republica-elecciones-1933/web01-a2haukon/es/
- López López, Francisco Manuel (2017). "Alhama, una excepción". Las elecciones legislativas del 19 de noviembre de 1933 en Alhama de Salmerón (PDF). El Eco de Alhambra No. 37. Archived from the original (PDF) on 5 September 2025.
- Company Matas, Arnau (2015). La Segona República a Mallorca. Eleccions, partits polítics, mitjans de comunicació i gestió pública. Universitat de les Illes Balears. Archived from the original on 2025-09-05.
- Ángel Ortega, Miguel (1987). Las elecciones de la Segunda República en Cuenca, el papel del continuísmo. UNED, Revista de la Facultad de Geografía e Histora, num. 1. Archived from the original on 5 September 2025.
- Sepúlveda Rosa, Rosa María (2003). Republicanos tibios, socialistas beligerantes. La República Social Inviable. Albacete 1933-1936. Instituto de Estudios Albacetenses. Diputación de la Provincia de Albacete.
- Vilanova, Mercedes (2006). Atles electoral de la Segona República a Catalunya. Volum 1, circumscripcions, comarques i municipis (PDF). Enciclopèdia Catalana. Archived from the original (PDF) on 5 September 2025.
- Velasco Gómez, José (1980). Elecciones de 1933 en Málaga (PDF). Revista Jábega No. 29. Archived from the original (PDF) on 4 April 2016.
- Gómez Salvago, José (1977). La Segunda República. Elecciones en Sevilla y su provincia. Universidad de Sevilla.
