= Results breakdown of the 1931 Spanish general election =

1931 Spanish general election
- 28 June 1931

All 470 seats of the Constituent Cortes 236 seats needed for a majority
- Turnout: 70.13%
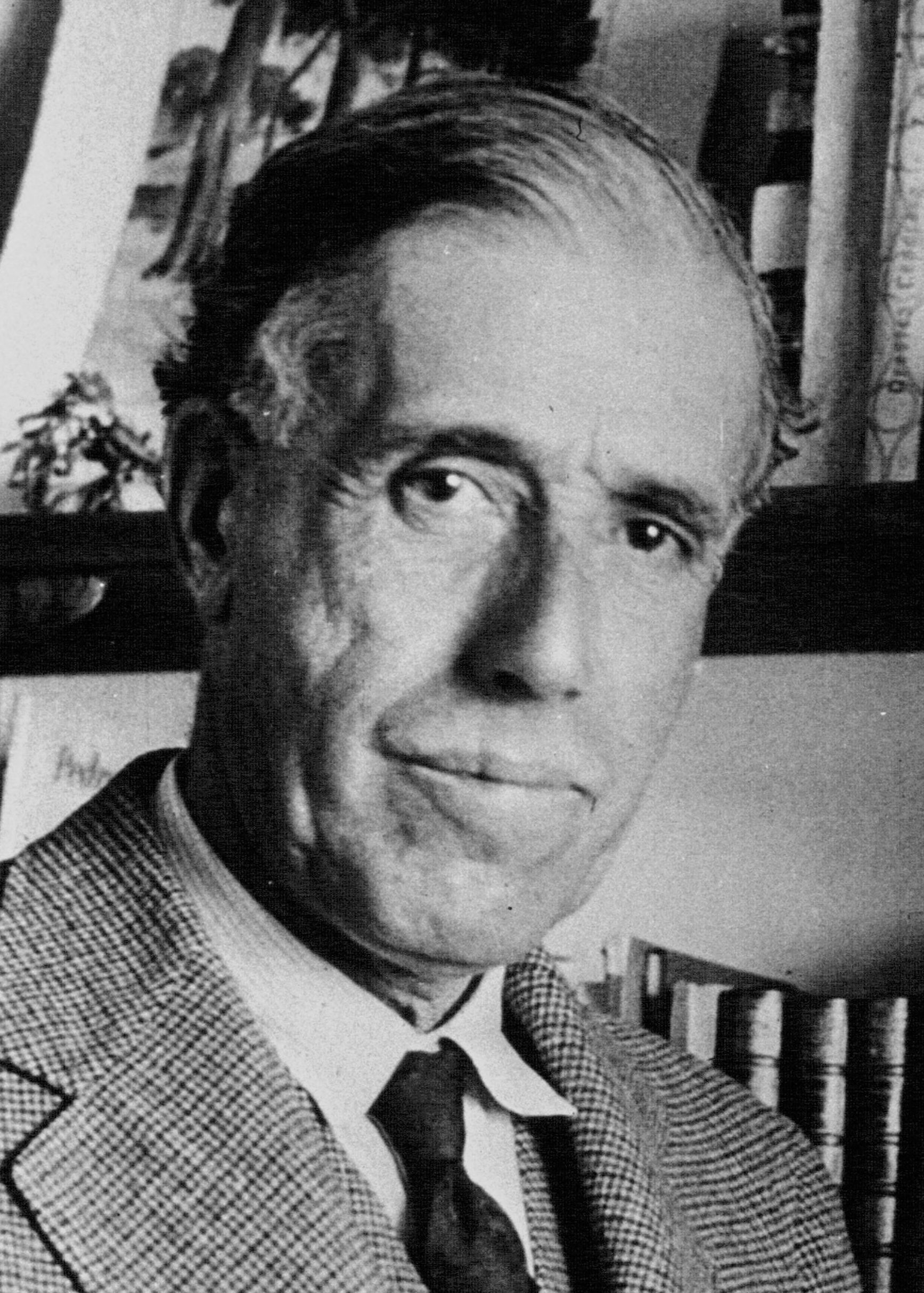

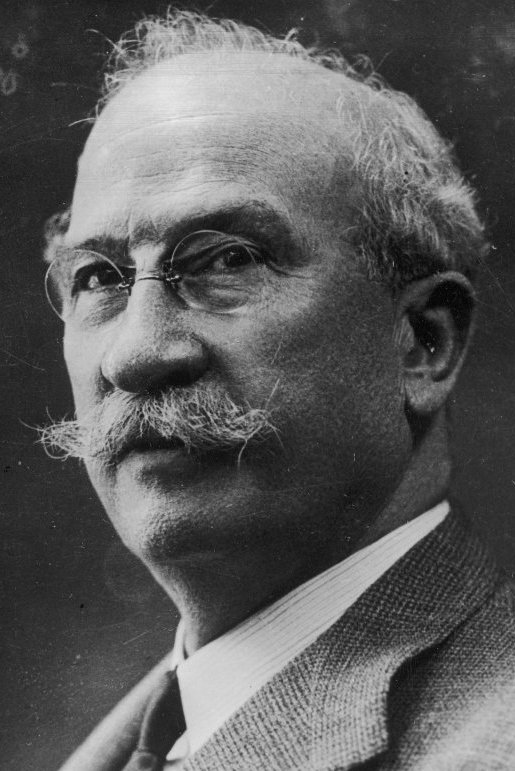

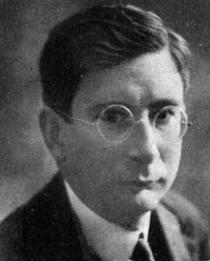

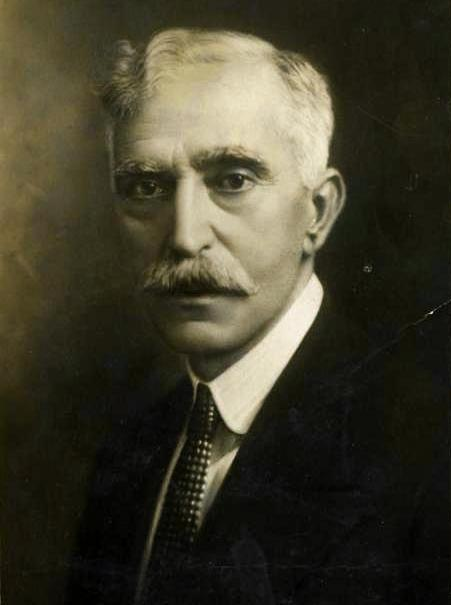

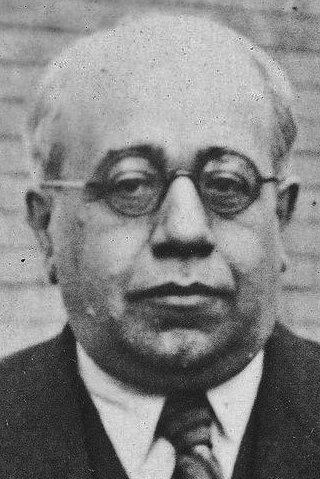

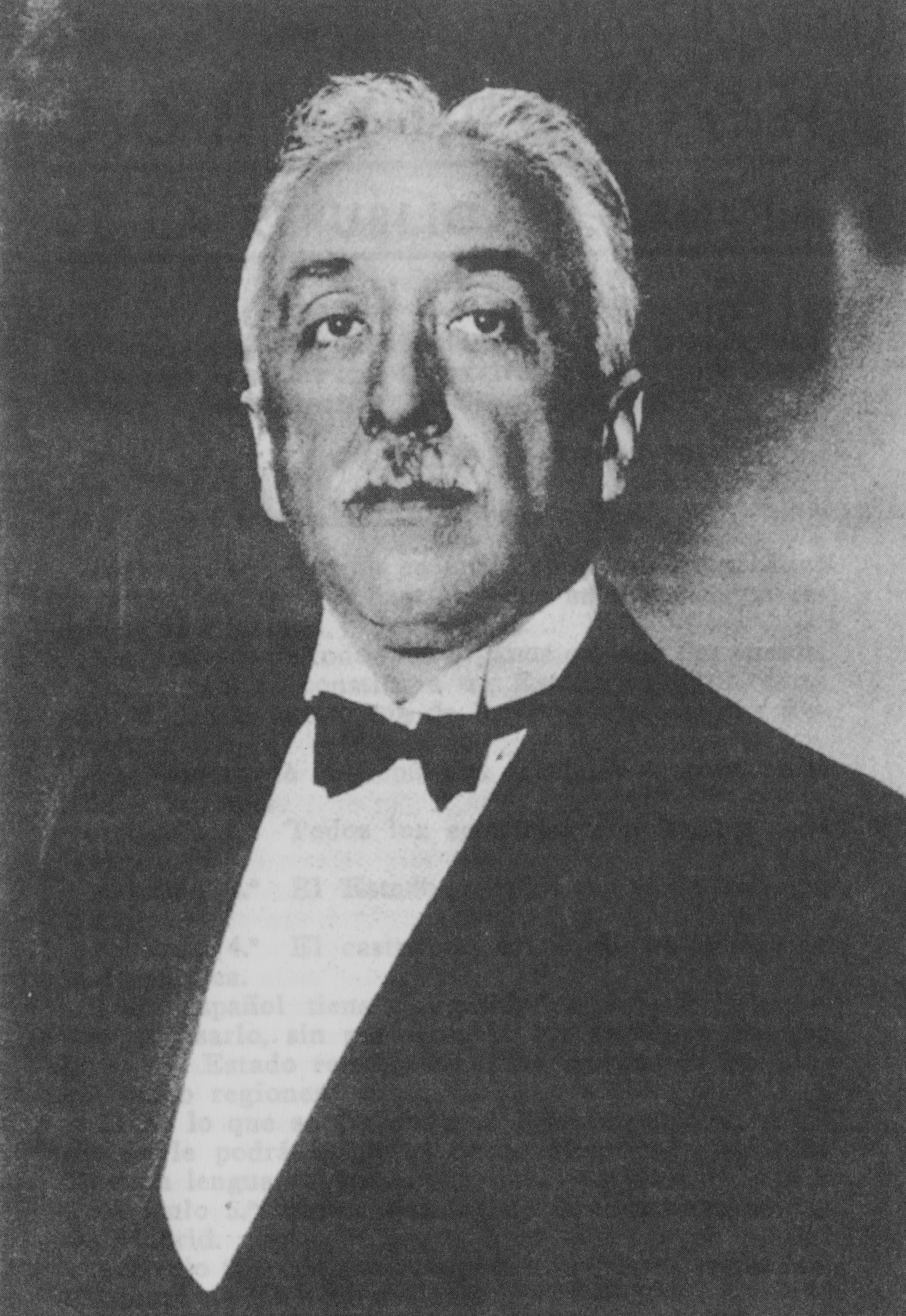
	First party	Second party	Third party
Leader	Julián Besteiro	Alejandro Lerroux	Marcelino Domingo
Party	PSOE	PRR	PRRS
Leader since	9 December 1925	1908	1929
Leader's seat	Madrid-capital	Madrid-capital	Tarragona
Seats won	115	81	54
Seat change	▲115	▲81	▲54
	Fourth party	Fifth party	Sixth party
Leader	Francesc Macià	Manuel Azaña	Niceto Alcalá-Zamora
Party	ERC	AR	DLR
Leader since	19 March 1931	1930	1930
Leader's seat	Lleida	Valencia-capital	Jaén
Seats won	23	18	27
Seat change	▲23	▲18	▲27
Prime Minister before election
Niceto Alcalá-Zamora
DLR
Prime Minister after election
Manuel Azaña
AR

The election to the Constituent Cortes was held in Spain on 28 June 1931, with subsequent rounds being held in order to fill vacant seats from July to October. The following tables gives the detailed results in each of the 63 constituencies.

== Electoral system ==
The electoral law of May 1931 replaced the previous single-member constituencies with much larger multi-member ones based on Spain's 50 provinces with cities larger than 100.000 inhabitants becoming constituencies (Madrid, Barcelona, Valencia, Bilbao, Seville, Zaragoza, Málaga, Córdoba, Granada, Cartagena and Murcia) as well as Ceuta and Melilla, making a total of 63 constituencies. The Senate was abolished and so the Cortes became unicameral. There would be one seat for every 50,000 people.

The votes each voter was entitled to cast were 75%-80% of the seats at stake in the constituency. For a candidate to be elected in the first round of voting they needed, at least, 20% of votes cast. If this was not achieved, vacant seats were filled through a second round. Another round of voting was carried out on 4 October 1931 in order to fill vacancies created as a result of a lawmaker being chosen in different constituencies.

As a result of the aforementioned allocation, each Congress multi-member constituency was entitled the following seats:

Seats	Constituencies
18	Madrid (city), Barcelona (city)
16	La Coruña, Oviedo
15	Barcelona (Province)
14	Badajoz
13	Valencia (Province), Jaén
12	Pontevedra
11	Alicante, Ciudad Real
10	Lugo, Toledo, Seville (Province), Cádiz, Córdoba (Province)
9	Orense, León, Madrid (Province), Cáceres, Granada
8	Burgos, Málaga (Province)
7	Santander, Salamanca, Navarre, Zaragoza (Province), Gerona, Tarragona, Balearic Islands, Valencia (City), Murcia (Province), Albacete, Huelva, Almería
6	Zamora, Valladolid, Bilbao (City), Guipúzcoa, Lérida, Castellón, Cuenca, Seville (City), Santa Cruz de Tenerife
5	Ávila, Huesca, Teruel, Las Palmas
4	Málaga (City), Segovia, Palencia, Logroño, Zaragoza (City), Murcia (City), Guadalajara
3	Soria, Vizcaya (Province), Granada (City)
2	Córdoba (City), Álava, Cartagena (City)
1	Ceuta, Melilla

== Nationwide ==
=== By electoral alliance ===
Electoral results by alliance (Note: Resigned seats are not being counted on the "Seats won" column)
Party	Name in Spanish or Catalan	Abbreviation	Composition	Seats won
Republican-Socialist Conjunction	Conjunción Republicano-Socialista	CRS	PSOE and some Republican parties	218
Socialist list	Lista Socialista	PSOE	PSOE, ASR in some constituencies	34
Catalan Left (Note: Only in Barcelona)	Esquerra Catalana	EC	ERC, USC	26
Radical list	Lista Radical	PRR	PRR, AR in Cáceres	17
Republican Coalition	Coalición Republicana	CR	Republican parties	16
Defenders of the Basque Statute (Note: Only in Vizcaya, Bilbao, Navarre and Guipuzcoa)	Defensores del Estatuto Vasco	Estella	PNV, CT, PCT	14
Left Alliance (Note: Only in Valencia)	Alianza de Izquierdas	Left	PURA/PRR, PSOE, AR, PRLD	14
Radical Socialist list	Lista Radical Socialista	PRRS	PRRS	12
Republican Entente (Note: Only in Lérida and Gerona)	Entensa Republicana	EntRep	ERC, PRR. In Gerona: PRDF, PCR	11
Republican Right list	Lista de la Derecha Republicana	DLR	DLR	8
Socialist and Republican Left (Note: Only in Alicante)	Izquierda Republicana y Socialista	Left	PRRS, PSOE, Ind.	8
Agrarian list	Lista Agraria	A	A	7
Left Republican Candidature (Note: Only in Tarragona)	Candidatura Republicana d'Esquerra	RepEsq	PSOE, ERC, PRR, PRRS	7
Minority Candidature (Note: Only in La Coruña)	Candidatura de Minoría	IndGall	Galicianist independents	4
Galicianist-Republican coalition (Note: Only in Pontevedra and Orense)	Coalición Republicano-Galleguista	CRG/CGR	FRG, DLR. In Pontevedra: PRR. In Orense: PRRS , PNzR	4
Federal Agrarian Coalition (Note: Only in Oviedo)	Coalición Federal-Agraria	FedAgr	PRDF, A	4
Union of the Right	Unión de Derechas	Right	A, AN	4
Left Republican Parties' Conjunction (Note: Only in Almería)	Conjunción de Partidos de la Izquierda Republicana	CIR	PRRS, PRR, PRDF	4
Unnamed list (Note: Only in Lugo)	Lista sin nombre	No name	PRR, PRP	3
National Action list	Lista Acción Nacional	AN	AN	3
Agrarian Bloc (Note: Only in Salamanca)	Bloque Agrario	BAgr	A, CatAgr	3
Republican list (Note: Only in Lugo)	Lista Republicana	Rep	PRR	1
Provincial Republican Association (Note: Only in Ávila)	Agrupación Republicana Provincial	ARP	ARP	2
Agrarian National Party (Note: Only in Valladolid)	Partido Nacional Agrario	PNAgr	PNAgr	1
Agrarian Catholics	Católico Agrarios	CatAgr	CatAgr	2
Liberal Democrat list	Lista Liberal Demócrata	PRLD	PRLD	1
Traditionalist list	Lista Tradicionalista	CT	CT	1
The Association of Service to the Republic list	Lista de la Agrupación al Servicio de la República	ASR	ASR	1
Right-Wing Republican Regionalist list (Note: Only in Gerona)	Lista Regionalista Republicana de Derechas	RRRight	LR, DLR	2
Extreme Federal Left (Note: Only in Barcelona)	Extrema izquierda Federal	EEF	EEF	2
Lliga Regionalista list (Note: Only in Lérida, Barcelona and Tarragona)	Lista de la Lliga Regionalista	LR	LR, CT	2
Catalan Republican Party list (Note: Only in Lérida, Barcelona and Tarragona)	Lista del Partit Catalanista Republicà	PCR	PCR	1
Monarchist Union (Note: Only in Orense)	Unión Monárquica	UMN	UMN	1
Federal list	Lista Federal	PRDF	PRDF	2
Centre Republican list	Republicanos de Centro	RC	PRCen, PRMall	2
Autonomist Republican Union Party list (Note: Only on the second rounds of Valencia)	Lista del Partido de Unión Republicana Autonomista	PURA	PURA	2
Republican Action list	Lista de Acción Republicana	AR	AR	2
Supporters of the Republic (Note: Only in Madrid (City))	Apoyo a la República	AAR	AAR, PRLD	2
Liberal Monarchist list (Note: Only in Guadalajara)	Lista Liberal Monárquica	Lib	Lib	1
Republican and Radical Right (Note: Only in Ciudad Real)	Derecha Republicana y Radical	RightRep	PRR, DLR	3
Revolutionary Republican Candidature (Note: Only in Seville)	Candidatura Republicano Revolucionaria	CRR	IRA, PRRSR	1
Independents				17
Total				470

=== By party ===
Electoral results by party (Note: The number of candidates combines those presented on all rounds minus those wh Ro resigned after being elected.) (Note: Resigned seats are not being counted on the "Seats won" column) (Note: Subsequent changes in candidates' political affiliation are not being taken into consideration.)
Party	Name in Spanish or Catalan	Abbreviation	Candidates	Seats won
Spanish Socialist Workers' Party	Partido Socialista Obrero Español	PSOE	165	115
Radical Republican Party	Partido Republicano Radical	PRR	151	81
Radical Socialist Republican Party	Partido Republicano Radical Socialista	PRRS	129	54
Liberal Republican Right	Derecha Liberal Republicana	DLR	122	27
Republican Left of Catalonia	Esquerra Republicana de Catalunya	ERC	23	23
Republican Action	Acción Republicana	AR	29	18
Federal Democratic Republican Party	Partido Republicano Democrático Federal	PRDF	74	18
Agrarians	Agrarios	A	47	16
Galician Republican Federation	Federación Republicana Gallega	FRG	19	14
Autonomous Republican Parties	Partidos Republicanos Autónomos	PRAut	12	8
The Association of Service to the Republican	Agrupación al Servicio de la República	ASR	8	8
Republican Alliance	Alianza Republciana	AlRep	8	7
Basque Nationalist Party	Partido Nacionalista Vasco	PNV	9	6
National Action	Acción Nacional	AN	44	5
Regionalist League	Lliga Regionalista	LR	34	4
Socialist Union of Catalonia	Unió Socialista de Catalunya	USC	5	4
Catalan Republican Party	Partit Catalanista Republicà	PCR	21	3
Traditionalist Communion	Comunión Tradicionalista	CT	10	3
Agrarian Catholics	Católico Agrarios	CatAgr	5	3
Revolutionary Left - Revolutionary Radical Socialist Republican Party	Izquierda Revolucionaria - Partido Republicano Radical Socialista Revolucionario	IRA-IRyA-PRRSR	31	2
Liberal Democrat Republican Party	Partido Republicano Liberal Demócrata	PRLD	18	2
Extreme Federal Left	Extrema Esquerra Federal	EEF	17	2
Provincial Republican Association	Agrupación Republicana Provincial	ARP	4	2
Centre Republican Party	Partido Republicano de Centro	PRCen	3	2
Supporters of the Republic	Apoyo a la República	AAR	3	2
Nationalist Republican Party of Orense	Partido Nazonalista Repubricán de Ourense	PNzR	2	1
Agrarian National Party	Partido Nacional Agrario	PNAgr	2	1
Liberal Monarchist	Monárquico Liberal	Lib	2	1
National Monarchist Union	Unión Monárquico Nacional	UMN	1	1
Traditional Catholic Party	Partido Católico Tradicionalista	PCT	1	1
Communist Party of Spain	Partido Comunista de España	PCE	116	0
Workers and Peasants' Bloc	Bloque Obrero y Campesino	BOC	41	0
Basque Nationalist Action	Acción Nacionalista Vasca	ANV	6	0
Republicans at the Service of the People	Republicanos al Servicio del Pueblo	RSP	6	0
Valencian Regional Right	Derecha Regional Valenciana	DRV	3	0
Republican Rural Democracy	Democracia Rural Republicana	DRR	3	0
Regionalist Party of Mallorca	Partido Regionalista de Mallorca	PRMall	1	0
Independents			192	36
Total				470

== Galicia ==
=== La Coruña ===
16 seats

- Republican–Socialist Conjunction (FRG-PSOE) 88.470 votes
- Minority candidature (IndGall) 44.631 votes
- Radical Party and Republican Alliance list (PRR) 36.563 votes
- Communist list (PCE) 1.244 votes

Electoral results
Candidate	Alliance	Party	Votes
Santiago Casares Quiroga	CRS	FRG	88.470
Antonio Rodríguez Pérez	CRS	FRG	75.498
Ramón Beade Méndez	CRS	PSOE	69.164
Salvador de Madariaga y Rojo	CRS	FRG	68.783
Alejandro Rodríguez Cadarso	CRS	FRG	68.741
Antón Villar Ponte	CRS	FRG	68.089
Edmundo Lorenzo Santiago	CRS	PSOE	67.794
Ramón M. Tendeiro Rodríguez	CRS	FRG	65.266
Emilio González López	CRS	FRG	64.048
José Mareque Santos	CRS	PSOE	56.486
Ramón Suárez Picallo	CRS	FRG	55.054
José Reino Caamaño	–	IndGall	47.258
Roberto Novoa Santos	CRS	FRG	44.953
Luis Cornide Quiroga	–	IndGall	44.705
Benito Blanco Royo Espada	–	IndGall	43.378
Leandro Pita Romero	–	IndGall	43.181
Gerardo Abad Conde	–	PRR	36.563
José Miñones Bernárdez	–	PRR	33.400
Alfredo Saralegui Caselles	–	PRR	33.359
Alejandro Lerroux García	–	PRR	30.968
Aurelio Fernández Morales	–	PRR	29.360
José García Ramos	–	PRR	27.834
Victoriano García Marti	–	PRR	25.048
Jaime Cancheiro	–	Ind.	24.194
Manuel Casariego Bares-Rey	–	PRR	23.503
Plácido Pena Novo	–	PRR	23.415
Federico Pérez Lago	–	PRR	19.775
Manuel Iglesias Corral	–	Ind.	19.292
Ramón María del Valle-Inclán	–	PRR	18.479
César Alvajar Diéguez	–	PRR	18.236
Antonio Alonso Ríos	–	Ind.	11.507
Antonio Méndez Gil Brandon	–	Ind.	5.326
Juan Martínez de Tejada	–	Ind.	3.266
Ramón Martínez López	–	Ind.	3.242
Jesús Juaños Buján	–	Ind.	2.987
Rafael Dieste	–	Ind.	2.708
Manuel Marín González	–	Ind.	2.001
Amanda Rodríguez Guerra	–	Ind.	1.906
José Silva Martínez	–	PCE	1.244
Teófilo González Calatrava	–	Ind.	1.229
Manuel Luguis Freiré	–	Ind.	969
José Bullejos	–	Ind.	866
Manuel Diez Rozas	–	Ind.	785
Ramón Casanellas	–	PCE	471
Jesús Garrote Nogueira	–	Ind.	395
Manuel García Felgueira	–	Ind.	383
Dolores Ibárruri	–	PCE	338
Vicente Arroyo	–	Ind.	330
Manuel Adame Misa	–	PCE	316
Vicente Várela Radio	–	Ind.	292
Rogelio Rama Muiño	–	Ind.	278
Leandro Carro	–	Ind.	185
Antonio Santamaría	–	Ind.	119
Gabriel León Trilla	–	PCE	113

=== Lugo ===
10 seats. This election was annulled

- Republican Coalition (PRR+DLR) 48.821 votes
- Autonomous Galician Republican Organization's list (ORGA) 39.444 votes
- Spanish Socialist Workers' Party list (PSOE) 37.414 votes
- Republican Alliance's list (AlRep) 24.492 votes

Electoral results
Candidate	Alliance	Party	Votes
Ubaldo Azpiazu	CR	PRR	48.821
Francisco Javier Elola	CR	PRR	46.721
José Lladó	CR	DLR	45.347
Luis Recasens	CR	DLR	44.985
José Sanjurjo Recasens	-	Ind.	43.613
Manuel Portela Valladares	-	Ind.	40.593
Lois Peña Novo	-	ORGA	39.444
Daniel Vázquez Campo	-	ORGA	39.234
Juan Tizón Herreros	-	PSOE	37.414
Sergio Andión	-	ORGA	36.393
Enrique Gómez Giménez	CR	DLR	27.244 (Note: Results collected on July 1, before counting was finished. They are not definitive.)
Rafael de Vega Carrera	-	AlRep	24.492 (Note: Results collected on July 1, before counting was finished. They are not definitive.)
Cándido Fernández López	-	AlRep	22.269 (Note: Results collected on July 1, before counting was finished. They are not definitive.)
Luis Soto Menor	-	AlRep	19.480 (Note: Results collected on July 1, before counting was finished. They are not definitive.)
Manuel Becerra Fernández	-	AlRep	13.922 (Note: Results collected on July 1, before counting was finished. They are not definitive.)
Ramón Rodríguez Prieto	-	AlRep	12.460 (Note: Results collected on July 1, before counting was finished. They are not definitive.)
Camilo López Pardo	-	AlRep	12.183 (Note: Results collected on July 1, before counting was finished. They are not definitive.)
Luis Díaz Gallego	-	AlRep	10.160 (Note: Results collected on July 1, before counting was finished. They are not definitive.)
Ricardo López Pardo	-	PSOE	7.027 (Note: Results collected on July 1, before counting was finished. They are not definitive.)
Carlos Vázquez F. Pimentel	-	PSOE	6.188 (Note: Results collected on July 1, before counting was finished. They are not definitive.)
Estanislao de la Iglesia	-	PSOE	(Note: No data)
José Cobreros de la Barrera	-	AlRep	(Note: No data)

Repeat elections carried out 23 August:

- Republican–Socialist Conjunction (PRR+PRP+ORGA+PSOE) 51.705 Votes
- Progressive Republican Party (PRP) (Note: Neyra opposes Jiménez's decision to join the CRS and decides to form his own list.)
- Republican list (PRR) 40.856 Votes
- Republican Action (AR) 4.325 Votes
- Unnamed list (PRR+PRP) 57.485 Votes
- Agrarian list (ORGA) 5.443 Votes
- Radical Socialist Republican list (PRRS) 2.582 Votes

Electoral results
Candidate	Alliance	Party	Votes
Ubaldu de Azpiazu y Artiazu	No name	PRR	57.485
José Lladó Vallés	No name	PRP	53.852
Enrique Gómez Giménez	CRS	PRP	51.709
Luis Recasens Siches	No name	PRP	49.429
Gerardo Abad Conde	CRS	PRR	48.660
Rafael de Vega Barrera	CRS	PRR	43.716
Manuel Becerra Fernández	Rep	PRR	40.856
Daniel Vázquez Campo	CRS	ORGA	32.087
Francisco Javier Elola	-	PRR	31.910
Manuel Portela Valladares	-	Ind.	31.171
Cándido Fernández López	-	ORGA	30.510
Lois Peña Novo	CRS	ORGA	29.936
Ricardo López Pardo	CRS	PSOE	27.309
Juan Tizón Herreros	CRS	PSOE	24.936
Sergio Andión Pérez	CRS	ORGA	23.495
Luis Soto Menor	-	PRRS	19.193
Enrique Álvarez de Neyra	PRP	PRP	9.061
Luis Fernando Saavedra Núñez	A	ORGA	5.443
Miguel Fidalgo Valentín	-	Ind.	4.943
Alejandro Polanco González	-	AR	4.325
Fernández Mato	-	Ind.	3.895
Emilio Novoa González	-	PRRS	2.582
Estanislao de la Iglesia	-	PSOE	1.708

=== Pontevedra ===
12 seats.

- Republican–Socialist Conjunction (PSOE-FRG-DLR) 53.738 Votes (Note: Supported by the provincial leadership of the Radical Republican Party)
- Galicianist-Republican coalition (PRR-DLR) 21.544 Votes
- Radical Agrarian list (A)
- Communist list (PCE)

Electoral results
Candidate	Alliance	Party	Votes
Emiliano Iglesias Ambrosio	CRS	FRG (Note: He'll later join the Radical Republican Party)	53.738
Enrique H. Botana	CRS	PSOE	53.037
Alejandro Otero Fernández	CRS	PSOE	50.411
Joaquín Poza Juncal	CRS	FRG	50.114
Manuel Varela Radio	CRS	FRG	48.504
Bibiano Fernández Osorio y Tafall	CRS	FRG	48.260
Eugenio Arbones Castellanzuelo	CRS	PSOE	44.293
José Gómez Osorio	CRS	PSOE	44.001
Laureano Gómez Paratcha	CRS	DLR (Note: He'll later join the Galician Republican Federation)	43.572
José López Varela	CRG	PRR	21.544
Alfonso Castelao	CRG	Ind.	19.551
Ramón Salgado Pérez	CRG	PRR	19.139
Valentín Paz Andrade	CRG	Ind.	18.605
Cabanillas	CRG	Ind.	18.006
Río Camota	CRG	DLR	16.364
Álvarez	-	A	15.705
Garra	-	A	15.274
Viñas del Monte	-	A	11.529
Ramón María del Valle-Inclán	-	A	9.287
Alfaya	-	A	9.127
Curbera	-	PCE	4.071
Artulo	-	PCE	826
Echegaray	-	PCE	813
Martínez	-	PCE	736

=== Orense ===
9 seats

- Republican-Socialist Conjunction (PRR+AR+PSOE) 41.327 Votes
- Galicianist-Republican Coalition (FRG+ PRRS+PNzR+DLR) 35.443 Votes
- Monarchist Union (UMN) 27.493 Votes
- Right's list 20.065 Votes

Electoral results
Candidate	Alliance	Party	Votes
Luis Fábrega Coello	CRS	PRR	41.327
Basilio Álvarez Rodríguez	CRS	PRR	38.420
Ramón Otero Pedrayo	CGR	PNzR	35.443
Alfonso Pazos Cid	CGR	PRRS	31.464
Justo Villanueva Gómez	CRS	PRR	30.714
Manuel Martínez Risco y Macías	CRS	AR	29.761
José Calvo-Sotelo	-	UMN	27.493
Alfonso Quintana Peña	CRS	PSOE	26.647
Manuel García Becerra	CGR	PRRS	26.426
Romero Cerveiriña	CGR	FRG	21.557
Taboada	Right	Ind.	20.065
Martínez-Risco y Agüero	CGR	PNzR	19.165
Estévez	CRS	PRR	16.691
André	CRS	PSOE	15.982
López García	CGR	PRRS	15.791
López Pérez	CGR	DLR	15.190
Suárez Castro	CRS	PSOE	14.935
Montes	CRS	PSOE	14.457
González Refojo	Right	Ind.	10.219
Vidal Leira	Right	Ind.	6.421
González García	-	Ind.	6.316
Lezón	Right	Ind.	4.930
Heruella	Right	Ind.	4.653
Espada	Right	Ind.	2.883
Araujo	Right	Ind.	2.509
Álvarez Estévez	-	DLR	2.151

== Asturias and the Region of León ==
=== Oviedo ===
16 seats.

- Republican-Socialist Conjunction (PSOE+PRRS+ASR+PRR+DLR): 83.087 Votes
- Federal Agrarian coalition (PRDF+A): 28.762 Votes
- Communist list (PCE): 12.690 Votes
- Rights' list (RepCrist+IndRight)
- Radical Socialist Revolutionary list (PRRSR): 8.939 Votes

(The PRLD and AN retired their lists from the elections)

Electoral results
Candidate	Alliance	Party	Votes
Teodomiro Menéndez Fernández	CRS	PSOE	83.087
Ramón Pérez de Ayala	CRS	ASR	81.742
Álvaro de Albornoz y Liminiana	CRS	PRRS	81.549
Leopoldo García Alas y García Argüelles	CRS	PRRS	80.215
Amador Fernández Montes	CRS	PSOE	78.662
Teodomiro Menéndez Fernández	CRS	PSOE	77.260
José Díaz Fernández	CRS	PRRS	76.952
Manuel Vigil Montoro	CRS	PSOE	76.303
Julián Ayesta Manchola	CRS	DLR	74.895
Carlos Martínez Martínez	CRS	PRRS	74.548
José Álvarez Buylla Godino	CRS	PRR	74.299
Manuel Rico Avello	CRS	ASR	70.348
Eduardo Barriobero Herrán	FedAgr	PRDF	28.762
Ángel Menéndez Suárez	FedAgr	A	27.233
Ángel Sarmiento González	FedAgr	A	26.627
Emilio Niembro Gutiérrez	FedAgr	PRDF	24.576
José Bullejos	–	PCE	12.690
José de la Fuente	–	PCE	12.160
Críspulo Gutiérrez	–	PCE	11.923
Rodríguez	–	PCE	11.911
Pedro Pidal y Bernardo de Quirós	Right	RCrist	10.942
F. Martínez	–	PRRSR	8.939
Escobedo	–	PRRSR	8.712
José Antonio Balbontín	–	PRRSR	8.605
Morán	–	PRRSR	8.230
Julián Díaz Valdepares	Right	Ind.	6.580
Pedro Segura Saenz	Right	Ind.	5.154
Vicente Madera Peña	Right	Ind.	4.708
Amador Juesas Latorre	Right	Ind.	4.575
Antonio Lombardía Alonso	Right	Ind.	4.476

=== León ===
9 seats

- Republican-Socialist Conjunction (PRRS+PSOE+ASR+AR): 65.816 Votes
- Republican Coalition (PRR+DLR): 21.849 Votes

Electoral results
Candidate	Alliance	Party	Votes
Publio Suárez Uriarte	CRS	Ind.	65.816
José Ortega y Gasset	CRS	ASR	57.794
Gabriel Franco López	CRS	AR	57.532
Félix Gordón Ordás	CRS	PRRS	56.543
Justino de Azcárate y Floréz	CRS	Ind.	54.978
Alfredo Nistal Martínez	CRS	PSOE	49.701
Miguel Castaño Quiñones	CRS	PSOE	46.972
Juan Castrillo Santos	CR	DLR	21.849
Francisco Molleda Garcés (Note: His position as State Attorney prevents him from taking his seat.)	CR	Ind.	17.230
Herminio Fernández de la Poza (Note: Elected as a result of Molleda Garcés' incompatibility)	CR	PRR	16.411
Mario Muñóz Castellano	CR	PRR	(Note: Data on non-elected candidates is missing.)
Segundo García y García	CR	Ind.	(Note: Data on non-elected candidates is missing)

=== Zamora ===
6 seats.

- Republican-Socialist Conjunction (DLR+PPRS+ASR+PSOE+A+Ind) 31.095
- National Action (AN) 17.201 Votes
- Liberal Democrat Republican Party (PRLD) 12.056 Votes
- Radicals' list (PRR) 9.594

Electoral results
Candidate	Alliance	Party	Votes
Miguel Maura	CRS	DLR	31.095
Ángel Galarza	CRS	PRRS	28.493
Jose María Cid Ruiz-Zorrilla	CRS	A	28.125
Santiago Alba	CRS	Ind.	25.680
Gregorio Marañón	CRS	ASR	24.976
Quirino Salvadores	CRS	PSOE	22.909
Geminiano Carrascal	-	AN	17.201
Leopoldo Palacios	-	PRLD	12.056
Julio Ayuso	-	PRR	9.594
Manuel García Morales	-	PRR	7.876
Baldomero Díez Lozano	-	Ind.	674

=== Salamanca ===
7 seats.

- Liberal Democrat Republican list (PRLD) 32.417 Votes
- Republican-Socialist Conjunction (PSOE+PRR+PRRS+AR) 32.418 Votes
- Liberal Republican Right (DLR) 28.213 Votes
- Agrarian Bloc (A+CatAgr): 26.365 Votes (Note: They also requested their supporters to vote for Escribano, from the DLR, and to vote for Villalobos, from the PRLD.)

Electoral results
Candidate	Alliance	Party	Votes
Filiberto Villalobos González	-	PRLD	32.418
Primitivo Santa Cecilia	CRS	PSOE	29.190
Miguel de Unamuno	CRS	Ind.	28.849
Tomás Marcos Escribano	-	DLR	28.213
José María Gil-Robles y Quiñones	BAgr	A (Note: He'll later join National Action)	26.365
Cándido Casanueva y Gorjón	BAgr	A	25.618
José María Lamamié de Clairac	BAgr	CatAgr	23.649
Casto Prieto Carrasco	CRS	AR	22.681
José Camón Aznar	CRS	PRR	20.191
Victoria Kent	CRS	PRRS	19.824
Luis Capdevila Gelabert	-	PRLD	19.316
Gonzalo Queipo de Llano	-	Ind.	16.359
Julio Ramón y Laca	-	DLR	15.734
Ángel Coca y Coca	-	Ind.	12.075
Serafín Pierna Catalá	-	Ind.	11.884
Diego Martín Veloz	-	Ind.	7.921

== Old Castile ==
=== Santander ===
7 seats.

- Republican-Socialist Conjunction (PRRS+PSOE+PRDF): 36.663 Votes
- Independent Regional list (A): 22.575 Votes
- Liberal Republican Right (DLR): 17.071 Votes
- Republican Right list: 14.495 Votes
- Lerrouxist Radical Republican list (PRR): 10.062 Votes
- Communist list (PCE): 881 Votes

Electoral results
Candidate	Alliance	Party	Votes
Bruno Alonso González	CRS	PSOE	36.663
Ramón Ruíz Rebollo	CRS	PRDF	35.700
Gregorio Villarías López	CRS	PRDF	31.951
Eduardo Pérez Iglesias	CRS	PRRS	31.763
Manuel Ruiz de Villa	CRS	PRRS	31.155
Lauro Fernández y González	–	A	22.575
Pedro Sainz Rodríguez	–	A	22.490
Alonso Velarde Blanco	–	DLR	17.071
Emilio Herrero Mazorro	–	DLR	16.603
Victoriano Sánchez y Sánchez	DerRep	Ind.	14.495
José Alday Redonet	–	DLR	10.655
Isidro Mateo Ortega	–	PRR	10.062
Ángel Escobio	–	PCE	881
José Bullejos	–	PCE	674
Enrique Rodríguez	–	PCE	674
Gabriel León Trillas	–	PCE	559
Luís de Hoyos Saínz	–	Ind.	545

=== Ávila ===
5 seats.

- Republican-Socialist Conjunction (PRR+PSOE+AR+PRRS): 22.564
- Provincial Republican Association (ARP) 21.845
- Liberal Republican Right (DLR): 16.375
- National Action (AN): 2.674

Electoral results
Candidate	Alliance	Party	Votes
Claudio Sánchez-Albornoz	CRS	AR	22.564
Ángel Torres Alonso	-	ARP	21.845
Francisco Barnés Salinas	CRS	PRRS	18.641
Nicasio Velayos y Velayos	-	ARP	18.215
Francisco Agustín Rodríguez	CRS	PRR	18.087
José Palmerino San Román	-	DLR	16.375
José Felipe García Muro	CRS	PSOE	16.333
Robustiano Pérez Arroyo	-	DLR	15.045
Francisco de la Peña	-	ARP	14.937
José Picón Meilhon	-	DLR	14.745
Pedro Cifuentes	-	ARP	10.905
José Martín Sampedro	-	AN	2.674
Antonio Bermejo de la Rica	-	AN	2.467

=== Segovia ===
4 seats.

- Agrarian list (A) 12.514 Votes
- Republican-Socialist Conjunction (PSOE+PRRS+AR): 11.143 Votes
- National Action (AN) 9.490 Votes
- Republican Right list (DLR): 7.156 Votes

Electoral results
Candidate	Alliance	Party	Votes
Jerónimo García Gallego	-	Ind.	14.573
Rufino Cano de Rueda	-	A	12.514
Cayetano Redondo Aceña	CRS	PSOE	11.143
Pedro Romero Rodríguez	CRS	PRR	11.138
José Luís Martín de Antonio	CRS	PRRS	10.488
Antonio García Tapia	-	Ind.	10.368
Juan de Contreras y López de Ayala	-	AN	9.490
Mariano Matesanz	-	Ind.	9.433
Eutiquiano Rebollar	-	DLR	7.156
Antonio Monedero	-	Ind.	6.703
Eugenio Tarragato	-	Ind.	3.090
Wenceslao Delgado	-	Ind.	1.540
Manuel Machimbarrena	-	Ind.	865
Francisco Pérez Fernández	-	Ind.	327

=== Soria ===
3 seats.

- Liberal Republican Right (DLR): 14.600
- Republican Coalition (PRDF+AlRep): 14.285
- Radical Socialist Republican Party (PRRS): 13.531

Electoral results
Candidate	Alliance	Party	Votes
Gregorio Arranz	–	DLR	14.600
Manuel Hilario Ayuso	CR	PRDF	14.285
Benito Artigas Arpón	–	PRRS	13.531
Adolfo Hinojar y Pons	CR	AlRep	11.284
Álvaro de Albornoz y Liminiana	–	PRRS	9.936

=== Valladolid ===
6 seats.

- Republican-Socialist Conjunction (PSOE+PRRS+AR): (Note: Even though the local assemblies had already formed a candidature, the national leadership of the PRRS forced the coalition with the socialists.) 35.943 Votes.
- Independent Agrarian list (A): 28.046 Votes
- Agrarian National Party (PNgr): 25.713 Votes
- Liberal Republican Right (DLR): 22.879 Votes
- Radical Socialist Republican Party (PRRS): (Note: Candidature formed by the local assemblies of the party) 1.359 Votes

1º round results
Candidate	Alliance	Party	Votes
Isidoro Vergara Castrillón	CRS	AlRep	35.943
Remigio Cabello Toral	CRS	PSOE	30.718
Luis Araquistain Toledo (Note: Resigns)	CRS	PSOE	30.160
Vicente Sol Sánchez	CRS	PRRS	29.662
Antonio Royo Villanova	-	A	28.046
Pedro Martín Martín	-	PNAgr	25.713
José Serrano Pacheco	-	DLR	22.879
Mariano Valdés García	-	PNAgr	20.650
Rafael Serrano Serrano	-	Ind.	3.828
Manuel Cocho Gil	-	PRRS	1.359
Emigdio del Fraile Carrillo	-	PRRS	995
Juan Blanco Ovejero	-	PRRS	826
José Cordero González	-	PRRS	719
Manuel Gil Baños	-	Ind.	181
Miguel de Mora	-	Ind.	126
José Garrote Tebar	-	Ind.	3

2º round results
Candidate	Alliance	Party	Votes
José Garrote Tébar	-	PSOE	22.804
Eustaquio Sanz T. Pasalobos	-	PRR	19.763
Velasco	-	Ind.	672

=== Burgos ===
8 seats.

- Agrarian list (A) 34.759 Votes
- Agrarian Catholics' list (CatAgr)
- Republican-Socialist Conjunction (PRR+PSOE+PRAut) 33.135 Votes
- Peasants' League (LdC) 16.001 Votes
- Radical Socialist list (PRRS) 8.015 Votes
- Liberal republican Right (DLR): 4.521 Votes

Electoral results
Candidate	Alliance	Party	Votes
Ramón de la Cuesta	-	A	34.759
José Martínez de Velasco	-	A	34.043
Tomás Alonso de Armiño	-	A	33.342
Perfecto Ruiz Dorronsoro	CRS	PRR	33.155
Luís García y G. Lozano	CRS	PRR	30.780
Ricardo Gómez Rojí	-	CatAgr	30.191
Aurelio Gómez	-	A	30.183
Francisco Estévanez Rodríguez	-	CatAgr	28.375
Antonio Martínez del Campo	CRS	Ind.	24.589
Manuel Santamaría	CRS	PSOE	24.455
Luís Labín	CRS	PSOE	23.384
Dionisio Rueda Peña	CRS	PRAut	21.186
Antonio Monedero	-	LdC	16.001
Eliseo Cuadrao	-	PRRS	8.015
Antonio Caballero	-	PRRS	6.908
Manuel Martín	-	PRRS	6.609
Francisco Vega	-	PRRS	6.584
Martín Vélez del Val	-	DLR	4.521
Francisco Rivera	-	PRRS	3.472
Miguel Bañuelos	-	PRRS	2.995
Alfonso de Egaña y Elizarán	-	LdC	2.984
Manuel Machimbarrena Aguirrebengoa	-	LdC	2.850

=== Palencia ===
4 seats.

- Republican-Socialist Conjunction (DLR+AlRep+PSOE) 25.029 Votes
- Agrarian Rights' Union (A+AN) 24.568 Votes

Electoral results
Candidate	Alliance	Party	Votes
César Gusano Rodríguez	CRS	DLR	25.029
Abilio Calderón Rojo	Right	A	24.568
Ricardo Cortes Villasana	Right	AN	24.107
Matías Peñalba Alonso	CRS	AlRep (Note: He'll later join Republican Action)	19.832
Juan Sánchez Rivera	CRS	PSOE	16.115
Antonio Monedero	-	AN	7.216
Fernando Suárez de Tangil	-	AN	2.418
Asurio Herrero	-	PSOE	1.650
César Lastra	-	Ind.	188

=== Logroño ===
4 seats

- Republican-Socialist Conjunction (PSOE+PRRS) (Note: Supported by Republican Action and the Autonomous Republican Party of Logroño) 23.183 Votes
- Liberal Democrat Republican Party (PRLD) 12.130 Votes
- Radical Republican Party (PRR) 9.240 Votes
- Federal Republican list (PRDF) 1.217 Votes
- Communist list formed by Joaquín Maurín, Vicente Arroyo López y Gabriel León Terilla. Results from those candidates are missing.

1º round results
Candidate	Alliance	Party	Votes
Jesús Ruiz del Río	CRS	PRRS	23.183
Isaac Abeytúa Pérez-Íñigo	CRS	PRRS	22.944
Amós Sabrás Gurrea	CRS	PSOE	21.033
Miguel Villanueva Gómez (Note: Died)	-	PRLD	12.130
Alejandro Gallego Benito	-	PRR	9.240
Eduardo Barriobero	-	PRDF	1.217
Sources:

- Agrarian list (A)
- Republican Action (AR)
- Republican Coalition (PRR) (Note: Félix Artiga was presented as a compromise candidate between the PRRS and the PRR, both of whom withdrew their respective candidates from the 1º round.)
- Spanish Socialist Workers Party (PSOE)
- Anti-imperialist and Revolutionary Left (IRYA)

2º round results (Note: To replace Villanueva)
Candidate	Alliance	Party	Votes
Tomás Ortiz de Solórzano	-	A	11.217
Amós Salvador Carreras	-	AR	8.027
Félix Artiga Fernández	CR	PRR	7.982
José Orad de la Torre	-	PSOE	5.397
César Falcón Garfias	-	IRYA	96

== Vascongadas and Navarre ==
=== Bilbao ===
6 seats.

- Republican-Socialist Conjunction (PSOE+PRRS) 32.982 Votes
- Defenders of the Basque Statute (PNV) (Note: Supported by the Traditionalist Communion) 23.723 Votes
- Communist list (PCE) 4.791 Votes
- Basque Nationalist Action (ANV) 2.763 Votes

Electoral results
Candidate	Alliance	Party	Votes
Indalecio Prieto Tuero	CRS	PSOE	32.982
Luis Araquistain	CRS	PSOE	32.316
Vicente Fatrás	CRS	PRRS	31.707
Ramón María de Aldasoro	CRS	PRRS	31.961
José Horn Areilza	Estella	PNV	23.723
Manuel Eguileor	Estella	PNV	23.319
Cosme Elguezabal	Estella	PNV	23.138
Manuel Robles Aranguiz	Estella	PNV	23.132
José Bullejos	–	PCE	4.791
Leandro Carro	–	PCE	4.253
Dolores Ibárruri	–	PCE	4.065
Manuel Adame Misa	–	PCE	3.995
Luis Urrengoechea	–	ANV	2.763
José Ignacio Arana	–	ANV	2.605
Cosme Duñabeitia	–	ANV	2.131
Miguel Mendiola	–	ANV	1.952

=== Vizcaya (province) ===
3 seats.

- Defenders of the Basque Statute (PNV+PCT) (Note: Supported by the Traditionalist Communion) 16.608 Votes
- Republican-Socialist Conjunction (PSOE+PRRS+AR) 6.441 Votes
- Basque Nationalist Action (ANV) 1.458 Votes

1º round results
Candidate	Alliance	Party	Votes
José Antonio Aguirre (Note: Resigned)	Estella	PNV	16.608
Marcelino Oreja Elósegui	Estella	PCT	15.982
Francisco Basterrechea	Estella	PNV	14.601
Ramón de Madariaga Alonso	CRS	Ind.	6.441
Julián Zugazagoitia	CRS	PSOE	6.381
Areitioaurtena	–	ANV	1.458

In the second round to replace José Antonio Aguirre, only one candidate ran: Manuel Robles Aranguiz of the PNV (Basque Nationalist Party). He received 19,527 votes.

=== Guipúzcoa ===
6 seats.

- Defenders of the Basque Statute (PNV+CT) 35.942 Votes
- Republican-Socialist Conjunction-ANV (PSOE-PRR-PRRS-ANV) 25.407 Votes
- Federal Republican list (PRDF): 482 Votes
- Communist list (PCE): 342 Votes

Electoral results
Candidate	Alliance	Party	Votes
Antonio Victor Pildáin y Zapiáin	Estella	Ind.	35.942
Rafael Picavea	Estella	Ind.	35.937
Jesús María de Leizaola	Estella	PNV	35.901
Julio Urquijo	Estella	CT	35.819
Juan Usabiaga Lasquibar	CRS	PRAut (Note: He'll later join the Republican Radical Party)	25.928
Enrique de Francisco Jiménez	CRS	PSOE	25.612
Justo Gárate Arriola	CRS	ANV	25.407
José María Amilibia Machimbarrena	CRS	PRR	25.254
Nicolás María de Urgoiti	–	PRDF	482
Luis de Castro	–	PRDF	459
José Bullejos	–	PCE	342
Juan Astigarrabía	–	PCE	329
Zapirain	–	PCE	316
Jesús Larrañaga	–	PCE	314

=== Álava ===
2 seats.

- Republican-Socialist Conjunction (PSOE+PRRS) 8.513
- Catholic-Fuerista list (CT) 8.016
- Basque Nationalist Action (PNV) 4.615

Electoral results
Candidate	Alliance	Party	Votes
Félix Susaeta	CRS	PRRS	8.375
José Luis Oriol	–	CT	7.971
Pantaleón R. Olano	–	PNV	4.520

=== Navarre ===
7 seats.

- Lista del Pacto Pro Estatuto de Estella (PNV+CT+Ind.) 46.925 Votes
- Republican-Socialist Conjunction (PSOE+PRRS+AR) 27.181 Votes

Candidate	Alliance	Party	Votes
Miguel Gortari Errea	Estella	CT	46.925
Rafael Aizpún Santafé	Estella	Ind.	46.699
José Antonio Aguirre y Lecube	Estella	PNV	46.419
Joaquín Beunza Redín	Estella	Ind.	46.102
Tomás Domínguez Arévalo	Estella	Ind.	45.940
Mariano Ansó Zunzarren	CRS	Ind. (Note: He'll later join Republican Action)	27.181
Emilio Azarola Gresillón	CRS	PRR	27.045
Aquiles Cuadra de Miguel	CRS	Ind.	26.649
Miguel Sáez Morilla	CRS	PSOE	26.128
Tiburcio Osácar	CRS	Ind. (Note: He'll later join the Spanish Socialist Workers Party)	25.265

== Aragon ==
=== Huesca ===
5 seats.

- Radical Republican Party (PRR) 27.180 Votes
- Radical Socialist list (PRRS) 20.667 Votes
- Jaca Uprising's list (PCE) 5.371 Votes
- Liberal Republican Right (DLR) 4.051 Votes
- Socialist list (PSOE) only on the 2º round 2.799 Votes
- Republican Agrarian list (A) 2.249 Votes

1º round results
Candidate	Alliance	Party	Votes
Alejandro Lerroux (Note: Resigned)	-	PRR	27.180
Rafael Ulled	-	PRR	24.692
Pío Díaz	-	PRR	22.650
José Salmerón García (Note: Resigned)	-	PRRS	20.677
Joaquín Mayo	-	PRR	19.882
Casimiro Lana	-	PRRS	19.160
Servando Marenco	-	PRRS	18.695
Victoria Kent	-	PRRS	18.067
Vicente Piniés Bayona (Note: Supported by José Sánchez-Guerra)	-	Ind.	8.679
Francisco Galán	-	PCE	5.371
Luis Salinas	-	PCE	4.956
Fernando Cárdenas	-	PCE	4.597
Luis Duch	-	PCE	4.402
Francisco Isarre	-	DLR	4.051
Celso Joaquinet	-	A	2.249
Miguel S. de Castro	-	Ind.	1.784
Luis Aymat	-	A	198
Miguel Moya Gastón	-	Ind.	32

2º round results (Note: To replace Lerroux and Salmerón)
Candidate	Alliance	Party	Votes
Tomás Peine Cabaleiro	-	PRR	17.666
Casimiro Lana Sarrate	-	PRRS	15.702
Juan Valdivia	-	PSOE	2.799

=== Zaragoza (city) ===
4 seats.

- Republican Coalition (PRR+PRRS) (Note: Solo en la 1º ronda) 24.074 Votes.
- National Action (AN) 8.324 Votes.
- Socialist list (PSOE) 5.639 Votes.
- Communist list (PCE) 3.845 Votes

1º round results
Candidate	Alliance	Party	Votes
Gil Gil y Gil	CR	PRR	24.074
Álvaro de Albornoz Laminiana (Note: Renuncia)	CR	PRRS	23.239
Manuel Marraco Ramón	CR	PRR	18.814
Santiago Guallar Poza	-	AN	8.324
José Gaos González-Poza	-	PSOE	5.639
Isidoro Achón Gallifa	-	PSOE	5.203
Francisco Albiñana Corralé	-	PSOE	4.170
Fernando Aragón	-	PCE	3.845
Mariano Tejero	-	Ind.	106
Genaro Poza (Note: The Liberal Republican Right did not participate in the capital's elections, yet 12 votes were cast and counted for Genaro Poza.)	-	DLR	12

2º round results (Note: To replace Álvaro de Albornoz)
Candidate	Alliance	Party	Votes
Sebastián Banzo Urrea	-	PRR	10.996
Ramón Serrano Suñer	-	AN	5.710
Francisco Merino García	-	PRRS	4.156
José María Adame	-	PCE	344
Julián Jiménez Sanz	-	Ind.	142
Fernando Aragón Gómez	-	PCE	122

=== Zaragoza (province) ===
7 seats.

- Republican Coalition (PRR+PRRS+AR+DLR): 41.962 Votes
- Socialist list (PSOE): 17.480 Votes.
- Maurists from the Liberal Republican Right (DLR+Ind.): (Note: The DLR suffered severe internal disputes following the electoral contest in the province of Zaragoza. The faction affiliated with the Republican Coalition would present Aranda as a candidate. The dissidents, led by Ossorio and Poza, who called themselves maurists (of Antonio Maura), presented an alternative candidacy. Once it was confirmed that Alcalá-Zamora would join the CR on behalf of the DLR, replacing Aranda, the Maurists requested that his name be included alongside those of Ossorio and Poza.) 15.855 Votes

1º round results
Candidate	Alliance	Party	Votes
Niceto Alcalá-Zamora y Torres (Note: Resigned)	CR	DLR	41.962
Darío Pérez García	CR	PRR	41.021
Honorato de Castro Bonel	CR	AR	40.958
Antonio Guallar Poza	CR	PRRS	34.861
Venancio Sarría Simón	CR	PRRS	33.619
José Algora Gorbea	-	PSOE	17.480
Manuel Albar Catalán	-	PSOE	17.355
Bernardo Aladrén Monterde	-	PSOE	16.850
Eduardo Castillo Blasco	-	PSOE	16.667
Genaro Poza Ibáñez	M	DLR	15.855
Ángel Ossorio y Gallardo	M	Ind.	15.551
Antonio Ruíz García	-	PSOE	15.378
Francisco Aranda Millán	Ind.	DLR	278

2º round results (Note: To replace Alcalá-Zamora)
Candidate	Alliance	Party	Votes
Basilio Paraíso Labad	-	PRR	24.465
Bernardo Aladrén Monterde	-	PSOE	15.511
José María González Gamonal	-	PRRS	10.054

=== Teruel ===
5 seats.

- Radical Socialist Republican Party (PRRS) (Note: The PRRS candidacy of Vilatela and Feced, elected by the local assemblies of the Party, was disavowed by Marcelino Domingo, national leader of the Party) 22.635 Votes
- The Association of Service to the Republic (ASR): 21470 Votes
- Republican Coalition (PRR+PRRS+DLR): 21.351 Votes
- Socialist list (PSOE+UGT):18.387 Votes
- Liberal Republican Right (DLR): (Note: Fernando Ruano presented his candidacy outside the Republican Coalition. The local press is unclear about the DLR's official position.) 3.849 Votes
- Liberal Democrat Republican Party (PRLD): 1.398 Votes
- People's Republican Party (PRPop): 626 Votes

Electoral results
Candidate	Alliance	Party	Votes
Gregorio Vilatela	-	PRRS	22.635
Ramón Feced	-	PRRS	22.371
Vicente Iranzo	-	ASR	21.470
Manuel Lorente Atienza	CR	PRR	21.351
José Borrajo	CR	PRR	19.911
Juan Martín Sauras	PSOE	PSOE	18.387
José Torán de la Rad	-	Ind.	16.140
Agustín Plana	CR	DLR	15.636
Pedro Díez	PSOE	PSOE	10.143
Antonio de Lezama	CR	PRRS	8.778
Pedro Pueyo	PSOE	UGT	6.663
Francisco Javier Fernández	-	Ind.	5.761
Fernando Ruano y Prieto	-	DLR	3.849
Joaquín Núñez Sastre	-	PRLD	1.398
Jaime Cussó	-	Ind.	1.096
Manuel Villén	-	PRPop	626
Carlos E. Montañés	-	Ind.	471

== Catalonia and the Balearic Islands ==
=== Lérida ===
6 seats.

- Republican Entente (ERC+PRR) 40.382 Votes
- Catalan Republican Party (PCR) 6.517 Votes
- Workers and Peasants' Bloc (BOC) 3.149 Votes
- Regionalist League-Agrarians (LR+A) (retired; 2.249 annulled votes)

Electoral results
Candidate	Alliance	Party	Votes
Francesc Macià Llusà	EntRep	ERC	40.382
Pere Coromines i Montanya	EntRep	Ind.	39.853
Humberto Torres Babera	EntRep	ERC	36.145
Epifani Bellí Castiel	EntRep	ERC	36.058
Ricardo Palacín Antevilla	EntRep	ERC	32.554
José Estadella Arno	EntRep	PRR	32.036
Josep Vives Giner	-	PCR	6.517
Domingo Pallerola Munné	-	PCR	6.285
Joaquín Maurín Juliá	-	BOC	3.159
Vicente Colomer Nadal	-	BOC	2.710
Joan Ferran Lamich	LR-A	LR	2.249
Ramón Sostres Maluquer	LR-A	A	2.222
Miguelo Bargues Murera	LR-A	A	1.876
Jaime Filella Bragos	LR-A	LR	1.810

=== Gerona ===
7 seats.

- Republican Entente (ERC+PCR+PRR+PRDF) 57.434 Votes
- Right-Wing Republican Regionalist list (LR+DLR) 16.560 Votes
- Workers and Peasants' Bloc (BOC) 1.640 Votes

Electoral results
Candidate	Alliance	Party	Votes
Salvador Albert y Pey	EntRep	PRDF	57.438
Manuel Carrasco Formiguera	EntRep	PCR	55.975
Miguel Santaló Pavorell	EntRep	ERC	55.795
Albert de Quintana i de León	EntRep	ERC	55.373
José Puig de Asprer	EntRep	PRR	54.790
Joan Estelrich Artigas	RRRight	LR	16.171
José Ayats Surribas	RRRight	DLR	16.058
Carlos Badia Malagrida	RRRight	LR	15.868
Juan Vallés y Pujals	RRRight	LR	15.816
Santiago Masó y Valentí	RRRight	LR	14.341
Jaume Miravitlles y Navarra	-	BOC	1.673
Miguel Adam Lecina	-	BOC	594

=== Barcelona (city) ===
18 seats.

- Catalan Left (ERC+USC) 111.108 Votes
- Regionalist League list (LR+CT) 43.511 Votes
- Catalan Republican Party (PCR) 35.524 Votes
- Radical's list (PRR+PRDF+DLR) 33.441 Votes
- Extreme Federal Left (EEF)12.938 Votes
- Socialist list (PSOE) 7.836 Votes.
- Workers and Peasants' Bloc (BOC) 1.275 Votes
- Communist list (PCE) 312 Votes

Resultados de la 1º ronda
Candidate	Alliance	Party	Votes
Francesc Macià Llusà (Note: Resigned)	EC	ERC	111.808
Gabriel Alomar Villalonga (Note: Resigned)	EC	USC	103.631
Jaume Aiguadé Miró	EC	ERC	103.585
Rafael Campalans Puig	EC	USC	102.884
Joan Puig i Ferreter	EC	ERC	101.084
Ventura Gassol Roviras	EC	ERC	100.090
Joan Lluhí i Vallescà	EC	ERC	98.739
Antoni Xirau Palau	EC	ERC	97.884
Josep Dencàs Puigdollers	EC	ERC	97.709
Josep Tarradellas Joan	EC	ERC	96.832
José Riera y Puntí	EC	ERC	96.384
Ángel Samblancat Salanova	EC	Ind.	96.267
Antonio Sbert Massonet	EC	ERC	95.395
Ramón Franco Bahamonde	EC	Ind.	91.731
Raimundo de Abadal Calderó	LR	LR	43.511
Joaquín Pi y Arsuaga	Rad	PRDF	33.441
Luis Nicolau d'Olwer	PCR	PCR	35.524
Pedro Rahola Molinas	LR	LR	29.220
Alejandro Lerroux	Rad	PRR	29.832
Niceto Alcalá-Zamora	Rad	DLR	27.770
Antonio Martínez Domingo	LR	LR	27.888
Fernando Valls Taberner	LR	LR	27.712
Juan Ventosa y Calvell	LR	LR	26.925
Luis Durán y Ventosa	LR	LR	26.662
José Sánchez Guerra	LR	LR	23.518
Joaquín Cabot Rovira	LR	LR	25.194
Federico Gambús i Rusca	LR	CT	24.929
Antonio Par y Musquets	LR	LR	24.666
José María Serraclara Costa	Rad	PRR	24.906
Juan José Rocha García	Rad	PRR	24.546
Antonio Montaner Castaño	Rad	PRR	24.468
Federico Mateu Fornells	LR	LR	23.759
Andrés Oliva Lacoma	LR	LR	23.595
José Codolá Gualdo	LR	LR	23.518
José Juncal Verdulla	Rad	PRR	23.542
Julio Martínez Gimeno	Rad	PRR	23.248
Antonio Marsá Bragado	Rad	PRR	23.122
Juan Giró Prat	Rad	PRR	23.109
Luis Ferrer-Vidal y Soler	LR	LR	22.906
Félix Antiga Fernández	Rad	PRR	22.493
Ramón Batlle Matabosch	LR	LR	22.051
Jaime Carner	Rad	Ind.	17.219
Jaime Bofill y Matas	PCR	PCR	12.515
Eduardo Barriobero Herrán	EEF	PRDF	12.938
Salvador Sediles Moreno.	EEF	EEF	12.792
Alberto Bastardas Sempere	PCR	PCR	11.977
Antonio Giménez Giménez	EEF	EEF	11.556
Eduardo Sanjuán Albi	EEF	EEF	10.015
Abel Velilla Sarazola	EEF	EEF	9.737
José Barbey Prats	PCR	PCR	9.729
Francisco Casas Sala	EEF	EEF	8.281
Fernando Rosell Jane	EEF	EEF	7.964
Raimundo Morales Veloso	PSOE	PSOE	7.836
Fernando Corbella Alegret	EEF	EEF	7.819
Jaime Turró Pont	EEF	EEF	7.522
Eugenio Carreras Bermúdez	EEF	EEF	7.333
Juan Perea Capulino	EEF	EEF	7.372
José Vila Cuenca	PSOE	PSOE	7.082
José Martí Feced	EEF	EEF	6.681
Joaquín Maurín Juliá	BOC	BOC	1.275
José García Miranda	BOC	BOC	1.105
Tomás Tusó Temprano	BOC	BOC	969
Hilario Arlandis Esparza	BOC	BOC	711
Jorge Arquer Saltó	BOC	BOC	741
Jaime Miratvilles Navarra	BOC	BOC	706
Víctor Colomer Nadal	BOC	BOC	623
Joaquín Masmano Pardo	BOC	BOC	597
Daniel Domingo Montserrat	BOC	BOC	587
Daniel Rebull Cabré	BOC	BOC	586
Pedro Fuentes Galileo	BOC	BOC	576
Joaquín Pijoá Gene	BOC	BOC	548
Antonio Sesé y Artaso	BOC	BOC	534
Pedro Bonet Cuito	BOC	BOC	530
Ramon Casanellas Lluch	PCE	PCE	312
José del Barrio Navarro	PCE	PCE	199
José Bullejos Sánchez	PCE	PCE	193
Dolores Ibárruri Gómez	PCE	PCE	185
Manuel Adame Misa	PCE	PCE	175
Gabriel León Trilla	PCE	PCE	161
Luis Arrarás Garay	PCE	PCE	166
Tomás Molinero Andaluz	PCE	PCE	144
Ramón Castañés	PCE	PCE	143
Antonio Leal	PCE	PCE	141
José Silva Martínez	PCE	PCE	140
Hermenegildo Figueres	PCE	PCE	140
Antonio Rodríguez	PCE	PCE	132
Heliodoro Iza	PCE	PCE	128
Rodrigo Soriano	Ind.	PRDF	26

2º round results (Note: To cover a vacanacy)
Candidate	Alliance	Party	Votes
Antonio Jiménez Jiménez	-	EEF	33.775
Pompeu Fabra Poch	-	PCR	18.891
Joaquín Maurín	-	BOC	12.323
Eduardo de Medrana	-	Ind.	3.561
Ramón Pociello	-	Ind.	714
Alejandro Lerroux	-	PRR	185

3º round results (Note: To replace Francesc Maciá and Gabriel Alomar)
Candidate	Alliance	Party	Votes
Pedro Rahola Molinas	-	LR	30.153
Martí Esteve Guau	-	PCR	14.805
Juan Giró Prat	-	PRR	12.499
Joaquín Maurín Julia	-	BOC	8.412
Francisco Escrig Gonzalvo	-	EEF	6.995
Felipe Barjau Riera	-	USC	5.181
Eduardo San Juan Albí	-	PRDF	3.339
Ramon Casanellas Lluch	-	PCE	1.301

4º round results (Note: To replace a vacancy on the 3º round)
Candidate	Alliance	Party	Votes
Martí Esteve Guau	-	PCR	41.314
Joaquín Maurín Julia	-	BOC	13.708
Ramón Casanellas Lluch	-	PCE	574

=== Barcelona (province) ===
15 seats.

- Catalan Left (ERC+USC) 117.594 Votes.
- Regionalist League list (LR+CT) 29.614 Votes
- Catalan Republican Party (PCR) 7.542 Votes
- Extreme Federal Left (EEF) 7.374 Votes
- Radical list (PRR) 7.285 Votes
- Workers and Peasants' Bloc (BOC) 1.800 Votes
- Federal Republican list (PRDF) only on the 2º round 47.280 Votes
- Liberal Republican Right (DLR) (Note: Supported by the Radical Republican Party) only on the 2º round 4.209 Votes

1º round results
Candidate	Alliance	Party	Votes
Josep Sunyol i Garriga	EC	Ind.	117.594
Lluis Companys Jovete	EC	ERC	113.288
Manuel Serra Moret	EC	USC	109.771
Amadeu Hurtado Miró	EC	Ind.	109.728
Josep Xirau i Palau	EC	USC	109.250
Domingo Palet y Barba	EC	ERC	108.242
José Grau Jasana	EC	ERC	108.135
Carles Pi i Sunyer	EC	Ind.	107.601
Amadeu Aragay Davi	EC	ERC	107.401
Juan Selvas Carne	EC	ERC	107.217
José Bordas de la Cuesta	EC	ERC	106.734
Juan Ventosa Roig	EC	ERC	106.676
Jaime de Riba y de España	LR	LR	29.614
Josep Maria Trias de Bes i Giró	LR	LR	29.218
Miquel Vidal y Guardiola	LR	LR	29.191
Antonio Miracle Mercadé	LR	LR	28.571
Enrique Maynes Gaspar	LR	LR	28.459
Federico Roda Ventura	LR	LR	28.390
Jaime Andreu Barber	LR	LR	28.236
José María Blanch Romeu	LR	LR	27.965
Leonci Soler i March	LR	LR	27.896
Juan Soler Janer	LR	CT	27.850
Luis Jover Nonell	-	PCR	7.452
Salvador Sediles Moreno	-	EEF	7.374
Casimiro Giralt Bullit	-	PRR	7.285
Antonio Jiménez Jiménez	-	EEF	7.097
José María Pou Sabater	-	PRR	6.618
Francisco Aldaz Legun	-	PRR	6.250
Francisco Masferrer Vernis	-	PCR	6.229
Nicolás Juncosa Sabater	-	PRR	6.019
Jaime Polo Otin	-	PRR	5.650
Carlos Rodríguez Soriano	-	PRR	5.539
Eduardo Batalla Cunllera	-	PRR	5.531
Rafael García Fando	-	PRR	5.368
Pedro Bohigas Tarrago	-	PRR	5.094
Francisco Casas Sala	-	EEF	5.006
José Serra Pascual	-	PRR	4.994
Eugenio Sánchez López	-	EEF	4.934
Eduardo Ragassol Sarra	-	PCR	4.750
Carlos Capdevila Recaséns	-	PCR	4.549
Avelino Estranger Macla	-	PCR	4.346
José Banús Moreu	-	PCR	4.081
José Tomás Piera	-	PCR	3.646
José García Miranda	-	BOC	1.800
Enrique Dalmau	-	BOC	1.312
Hilario Arlandis	-	BOC	1.275

2º round results (Note: To cover three vacancies)
Candidate	Alliance	Party	Votes
Salvador Sediles Moreno	-	EEF	47.280
Eduardo Layret Foix	-	Ind.	26.574
Manuel Dolcet Carmén	-	PRDF	24.810
Albert Bastardas Sampere	-	PCR	14.244
Miguel Balta Botta	-	PCR	10.933
Jaime Serra Hunter	-	PCR	7.141
Mariano Rubio Tuduri	-	Ind.	6.340
Rafael Sánchez-Guerra	-	DLR	4.209
Domingo Aldomá	-	Ind.	4.149
Francisco Casas Sala	-	Ind.	3.916
José García Miranda	-	BOC	2.033
Hilario Arlandiz Esparza	-	BOC	1.244
Antonio Marina y Malats	-	Ind.	607

=== Tarragona ===
7 seats.

- Left Republican Candidature (PSOE+ERC+PRRS+PRR+ERC) 68.537 Votes
- Republican Autonomist League (LR+CT) 13.259 Votes
- Catalan Republican Party (PCR) 7.541 Votes
- Workers and Peasants' Bloc (BOC) 2.344 Votes

Electoral results
Candidate	Alliance	Party	Votes
Marcelino Domingo y San Juan	RepEsq	PRRS	68.537
Ramón Nogués y Bizet	RepEsq	PRRS	62.317
Jaume Carner Romeu	RepEsq	Ind.	57.080
Josep Berenguer i Cros	RepEsq	PRRS	56.521
Joan Loperena Romà	RepEsq	ERC	47.241
Jaume Simó Bofarull	RepEsq	PRR	22.880
Amós Ruiz Lecina	RepEsq	PSOE	21.573
Josep María Tallada i Pauli	LAR	LR	13.259
Albert Talavera i Sabater	LAR	LR	12.804
Josep María Gich i Pí	LAR	LR	11.178
Juan Bautista Roca i Caball	LAR	CT	9.654
Joan Torras i Puig	LAR	LR	8.192
Antoni Rovira i Virgili	-	PCR	7.541
José García Miranda	-	BOC	2.344
Eusebio Rodríguez Salas	-	BOC	1.367

=== Balearic Islands ===
7 seats.

- Republican-Socialist Conjunction (PSOE+AR+PRR+PRRS) (Note: Supported by the Liberal Democrat Republican Party) 35.482 Votes
- Centre Republican list (PRCen+PRM) 31.580 Votes
- Liberal Republican Right (DLR) 24.050 Votes
- Republican Concentration (CRep) 10.970 Votes
- Communist list (PCE) 152 Votes

1º round results
Candidate	Alliance	Party	Votes
Francesc Julià	CRS	PRDF	35.241
Alexandre Jaume	CRS	PSOE	35.224
Manuel Azaña (Note: Resigned)	CRS	AR	35.482
Gabriel Alomar	CRS	PRRS (Note: Even though he was a member of the Socialist Union of Catalonia, he was nominated by the PRRS on the Balearic Islands.)	34.170
José Canet	CRS	PRDF	33.778
Juan March	RC	PRCen	31.580
Luis Alemany	RC	PRCen	30.101
Pedro Matutes	RC	PRCen	26.334
Bartolomé Fons	RC	PRMall	25.454
José Socias	-	DLR	24.050
José María Ruiz Manent	-	DLR	21.370
Carlos Román	-	DLR	16.928
Antonio Pou	-	CRep	10.970
José Bullejos	-	PCE	152
José Silva Martínez	-	PCE	138
Manuel Adame Misa	-	PCE	138
Dolores Ibárruri	-	PCE	134
Encarnación Fuyola Miret	-	PCE	125

Candidate	Alliance	Party	Votes
Francisco Carreras Reura	CRS	AR	22.406
Antonio Pou	-	CRep	17.531
Manuel Adame Misa	-	PCE	628
José María Albiñana	-	Ind.	515

== Region of Valencia ==
=== Castellón ===
6 seats.

- Republican-Socialist Conjunction (PRAut+PRR+PSOE+AR+DLR) 44.063 Votes
- Radical Socialist list (PRRS) 10.630 Votes
- Catholic Independent list 10.530 Votes

Electoral results
Candidate	Alliance	Party	Votes
Fernando Gasset Lacasaña (Note: He'll later join the Radical Republican Party)	CRS	PRAut	44.063
Vicente Sales Musoles	CRS	DLR	41.135
Juan Sapiña Camaró	CRS	PSOE	38.060
Álvaro Pascual-Leone Forner	CRS	PRR	36.651
José Royo Gómez	CRS	AR	35.947
Vicente Cantos Figuerola (Note: He'll later join the Radical Republican Party)	-	Ind.	16.025
Miguel Peña Masip	-	PRRS	11.261
Bautista Planelles	-	Ind.	7.631
José Castelló Soler	-	PRRS	10.630
Jaime Chicharro (Note: He'll later join the Traditionalist Communion)	-	Ind.	10.538
Tomás Benet Benet	-	PRRS	6.628
Artur Perucho Badia	-	PRRS	6.093

=== Valencia (city) ===
7 seats.

- Left Alliance (PRR/PURA+PSOE+AR+PRLD) 54.027 Votes
- Radical Socialist list (PRRS) 22.674 Votes
- Republican right list (DLR) 10.896 Votes
- Valencian Regional Right (DRV) 9.483 Votes
- Federal Republican list (PRDF) 6.093 Votes

1º round results
Candidate	Alliance	Party	Votes
Alejandro Lerroux García (Note: Resigned)	Left	PRR	54.027
Manuel Azaña Díaz	Left	AR	51.937
Melquiades Álvarez González	Left	PRLD	46.552
Sigfrido Blasco-Ibáñez Blasco	Left	PURA	45.881
Francisco Sanchis Pascual	Left	PSOE	45.289
Fernando Valera Aparicio	-	PRRS	22.674
Pedro Vargas Guerendiain	-	PRRS	15.903
Jesús Rubio Villanueva	-	PRRS	12.004
José Cano Coloma	-	PRRS	11.719
Miguel San Andrés Castro	-	PRRS	11.448
Mariano Gómez González	-	DLR	10.896
Luis García Guijarro	-	DRV	9.483
Luis Lucía Lucía	-	DRV	9.052
Rafael Sánchez-Guerra	-	DLR	6.210
Rodrigo Soriano	-	PRDF	2.377
Aurelio Blasco Grajales	-	PRDF	1.137
Fernando Ferri Vicente	-	PRDF	666
Gaspar Polo Torres	-	PRDF	452

2º round results (Note: To replace Lerroux)
Candidate	Alliance	Party	Votes
Joaquín García Ribes	-	PURA	28.477
Jesús Rubio Villanueva	-	PRRS	14.946

=== Valencia (province) ===
13 seats.

- Left Alliance (PRR/PURA+PSOE) (Note: Supported by Republican Action and the Liberal Democrat Republican Party) 78.622 Votes
- Radical Socialist list (PRRS) 46.142 Votes
- Liberal Republican Right (DLR) 32.080 Votes
- Traditionalist list (CT) 13.172 Votes
- Independent Republican list 9.880 Votes
- Valencian Regional Right (DRV): retired

1º round results
Candidate	Alliance	Party	Votes
Ricardo Samper Ibáñez	Left	PURA	78.622
Isidro Escandell Úbeda	Left	PSOE	76.686
Julio Just Jimeno	Left	PURA	75.339
Juan Calot Sanz	Left	PURA	75.302
Pedro García García	Left	PSOE	75.166
Juan Bort Olmos	Left	PURA	74.630
Vicente Marco Miranda	Left	PURA	74.343
Gerardo Carreres Bayarri	Left	PURA	73.105
José García-Berlanga Pardo (Note: He'll later join the Autonomist Republican Union Party)	Left	Ind.	67.139
José Manteca Roger (Note: He'll later join the Autonomist Republican Union Party)	Left	Ind.	60.289
Fernando Valera Aparicio (Note: Resigned)	-	PRRS	46.142
Pedro Vargas Guerendiain (Note: Resigned)	-	PRRS	39.933
Miguel San Andrés Castro	-	PRRS	35.242
José Cano Coloma	-	PRRS	33.600
Francisco Villanueva Oñate	-	PRRS	33.332
Francisco Puig-Espert	-	PRRS	32.515
Jesús Rubio Villanueva	-	PRRS	32.098
Mariano Gómez González	-	DLR	32.080
José Fabra Torres	-	PRRS	30.896
Emilio Artal Fos	-	PRRS	29.932
Victor Calatayud Benavent	-	PRRS	29.858
Rafael Sánchez-Guerra Sainz	-	DLR	28.347
Vicente Fe Castell	-	DLR	26.112
Salvador Onofre Sastre Olamendi	-	DLR	25.685
Eduardo Pardo Reyna	-	DLR	24.226
Emilio Bordanove Tarraso	-	DLR	23.573
José Moscardó García	-	DLR	20.789
Eduardo Molero Massa	-	DLR	20.631
Salvador Vila Vilar	-	DLR	20.595
Miguel Alcalá Martínez	-	DLR	18.555
José Selva Mergelina	-	CT	13.172
Rafael Díaz Aguado y Salaberry	-	CT	12.925
Enrique García Torres	-	Ind.	9.880

2º round results (Note: To replace Valera and Vargas)
Candidate	Alliance	Party	Votes
Héctor Altabás	-	PURA	44.519
José Cano Coloma	-	PRRS	24.180
Luis García Guijarro	-	DRV	22.368
Antonio de Gracia	-	PSOE	14.719
Mariano Gómez González	-	PRP	9.384

=== Alicante ===
11 seats.

- Socialist and Republican Left list (PRRS+PSOE+Ind) 73.841 Votes.
- Republican list (PRR+DLR) (Note: Supported by the Republican Alliance) 35.412 Votes.
- Republican Action (AR) 18.374 Votes.
- Federal Republican list (PRDF) 10.513 Votes.
- Dissident Radical Socialist Republican Party (PRRS) 6.656 Votes

Electoral results
Candidate	Alliance	Party	Votes
Rodolfo Llopis	Left	PSOE	73.841
Carlos Esplá Rizo	Left	Ind.	71.841
Antonio Pérez Torreblanca	Left	PRRS	67.297
Julio María López Orozco	Left	PRRS	67.013
Juan Botella Asensi	Left	PRRS	64.899
Romualdo Rodríguez Vera	Left	PSOE	63.453
Manuel González Ramos	Left	PSOE	62.403
Miguel de Cámara	CR	PRR	35.412
César Puig	CR	PRR	33.617
Jerónimo Gomáriz	Left	PRRS	33.308
César Oarrichena Genaro	CR	PRR	33.054
Joaquín Chapaprieta	CR	DLR	32.914
Manuel Pomares	CR	DLR	27.495
José Cañizares Domene	Ind.	PSOE	26.441
Romualdo Catalá	CR	DLR	26.283
Gregorio Ridaura	CR	DLR	25.197
Pedro Beltrán de la Llave	CR	DLR	23.797
Ángel Pascual y Devesa	-	AR	18.374
Mateo Hernández Barroso	-	AR	14.444
José Pérez García	-	PRDF	10.513
Francisco Javier Morata	-	Ind.	10.414
José Escudero Bernícola	Ind.	PRRS	6.656
José Martínez Ruiz	-	PRDF	2.923
Germán Benacer	-	Ind.	2.751
Francisco Figueras	-	PRDF	1.304
Oscar Esplá	-	Ind.	539

== Region of Murcia ==
=== Albacete ===
7 seats.

- Republican-Socialist Conjunction (PSOE+AR+PRR) 45.239 Votes.
- Radical Socialist list (PRRS) 12.706 Votes.
- Provincial Agrarian Union (A) 11.905 Votes
- Liberal Democrat Republican Party (PRLD) 8.825 Votes.
- National Action (AN) 4.825 Votes.
- Republican Right list (DLR) 1.823 Votes.

1º round results
Candidate	Alliance	Party	Votes
Antonio Velao	CRS	AR	45.236
Edmundo Alfaro Gironda	CRS	PRR	42.489
Antonio Fabra Rivas	CRS	PSOE	45.030
Esteban Mirasol	CRS	AR	43.243
Rodolfo Viñas	CRS	PSOE	40.964
Manuel Alcázar	-	PRRS	12.706
Pedro Acacio Sandoval	-	A	11.905
Rafael Selfa	-	PRRS	10.517
José Jiménez Arribas	-	PRLD	8.825
José Manuel Pedregal	-	PRLD	7.003
Felipe Llopis	-	PRRS	5.954
Francisco R. Sedano	-	AN	4.825
Rodolfo M. Acebal	-	PRRS	4.694
Juan Gómez Acebo	-	AN	2.413
Juan M. Pardo	-	DLR	1.823
Sources:

- Republican Action (AR) 26.859 Votes
- Socialist list (PSOE) 8.159 Votes

2º round results
Candidate	Alliance	Party	Votes
Fernando Coca	-	AR	26.859
Severiano Garrido	-	PSOE	8.779

=== Murcia (city) ===
4 seats.

- Republican-Socialist Conjunction (PRR+PSOE+AR) 16.925 Votes.
- Radical Socialist list (PRRS) 13.006 Votes.
- Federal Republican list (PRDF) 2.416 Votes.
- DLR and Agrarian lists retired

Candidate	Alliance	Party	Votes
Laureano Sánchez Gallego	CRS	PSOE	16.925
Miguel Rivera Ruiz	CRS	PRR	16.761
Mariano Ruiz-Funes	CRS	AR	16.703
José Moreno Galvache	-	PRRS	13.006
Luis López Ambit	-	PRRS	12.263
José María Bautista Hernández	-	PRRS	11.792
Antonio Puig Campillo	-	PRDF	2.416
Dr. Cárceles	-	PRDF	2.175

=== Murcia (province) ===
7 seats.

- Republican-Socialist Conjunction (PRR+PSOE) 30.890 Votes
- Republican Action (AR) 16.669 Votes
- Radical Socialist Republican Party (PRRS) 16.370 Votes
- Liberal Republican Right (DLR) 14.681 Votes
- Republican Agrarian list 9.381 Votes.
- Republican Rural Democracy (DRR) 6.611 Votes.

Candidate	Alliance	Party	Votes
Luis Prieto Jiménez	CRS	PSOE	30.890
José Ruiz del Toro	CRS	PSOE	30.721
Salvador Martínez Moya	CRS	PRR	27.723
José Cardona Serra	CRS	PRR	25.354
José Templado	CRS	PRR	19.560
Gonzalo Figueroa O'Neil	-	AR	16.669
Francisco López de Goicoechea	-	PRRS	16.370
José Salmerón García	-	PRRS	16.120
Joaquín Payá	-	DLR	14.681
Juan Antonio Méndez	-	PRRS	12.774
Tomás Gómez Piñán	-	DLR	11.310
Luis Guardiola	-	Ind.	9.772
Miguel Luelmo	-	PRRS	9.422
Florentino Gómez Tornero	-	A	9.381
Martín Pérez Romero	-	PRRS	8.664
Antonio Ros	-	PRRS	8.243
José Más de Bejar	-	DLR	8.001
Ezequiel García Martínez	-	DRR	6.611
José Ríos Gil	Ind.	PSOE	5.635
José Escudero Escudero	-	PRRS	3.895
Tomás de Aquino Arqueríos	-	Ind.	3.570
Pedro Chico Cánovas	-	Ind.	1.805

=== Cartagena ===
2 seats.

- For the Alliance - Radical Republican (PRR) 7.731 Votes.
- Radical Socialist list (PRRS) 4.063 Votes.
- Socialist list (PSOE) 2.349 Votes.
- Republican right list (DLR) 1.658 Votes.

Candidate	Alliance	Party	Votes
Ángel Rizo Bayona	-	PRR	7.731
Ramón Navarro Vives	-	PRRS	4.063
Amancio Muñoz de Zafra	-	PSOE	2.349
Pablo Sanz Cabo	-	DLR	1.658

== New Castile ==
=== Madrid (city) ===
18 seats.

- Republican-Socialist Conjunction (PSOE+AR+PRR+DLR+PRRS+PRDF): 133.789 Votes
- Supporters of the Republic (PRLD+Ind): 38.970 Votes
- National Action (AN): 27.865 Votes
- Federal Republicans' list (PRDF): 9.480 Votes
- Jaimist list (CT): 7.521 Votes
- Radical Socialist Revolutionary list (PRRSR+PRRS): 4.916 Votes
- Republican Purity (DLR): 3.863 Votes
- Communist list (PCE): 2.769 Votes
- Workers and Peasants' Bloc (BOC): 2.158 Votes

1º round results
Candidate	Alliance	Party	Votes
Alejandro Lerroux García	CRS	PRR	133789
Roberto Castrovido Sanz	CRS	Ind.	126603
Felipe Sánchez Román	CRS	Ind.	125375
Pedro Rico López	CRS	AR	124227
Francisco Largo Caballero	CRS	PSOE	118431
Julián Besteiro Fernández	CRS	PSOE	117917
Luis de Tapia Romero	CRS	PRRS	115769
César Juarros Ortega	CRS	DLR	114326
José Sanchís Banús	CRS	PSOE	111879
Andrés Ovejero Bustamante	CRS	PSOE	110866
Melchor Marial Bundet	CRS	PRDF	106879
Manuel Cordero Pérez	CRS	PSOE	104567
Andrés Saborit Colomer	CRS	PSOE	103882
Trifón Gómez San Jose	CRS	PSOE	93290
Ángel Ossorio y Gallardo	AAR	AAR	38970
Melquíades Álvarez (Note: Resigned)	AAR	PRLD	35621
José Sánchez Guerra	AAR	AAR	35124
Ángel Herrera Oria	AN	AN	27865
Antonio Goicoechea	AN	AN	26271
Manuel Castellanos	AN	AN	25524
Marqués de Lema	AN	AN	24542
Luis Montiel Balanzat	AAR	AAR	17889
Rodrigo Soriano	PRDF	PRDF	9480
Hernando de Larramendi	CT	CT	7521
Eduardo Barriobero	PRDF	PRDF	5140
Ramón Franco	PRDF	PRDF	4916
Joaquín Pi y Arsuaga	PRDF	PRDF	4676
José Antonio Balbontín	PRRSRev	PRRSRev	4002
Dr. Goyanes	PR	DLR	3863
Nicolás Salmerón y García	PRRSRev	PRRS	3273
Torrubiano	PR	DLR	3217
Benlliure Tuero	PRRSRev	PRRSRev	2916
José Bullejos	PCE	PCE	2769
Rocamora	PRDF	PRDF	2655
Vivero	PRDF	PRDF	2348
Augusto Vivero	PRRSRev	PRRSRev	2348
Manuel Adame Misa	PCE	PCE	2338
Casanellas	PCE	PCE	2334
César Falcón	PRRSRev	PRRSRev	2158
Barón	BOC	BOC	2158
Graco Marsá	PRRSRev	PRRSRev	2133
Vega	BOC	BOC	2125
Santiago	BOC	BOC	2090
Gabriel León Trilla	PCE	PCE	2031
Arroyo	PCE	PCE	2021
Reparaz	PR	DLR	1989
Pérez	PRDF	PRDF	1960
Fuyola	PCE	PCE	1943
Silva	PCE	PCE	1804
Zubillaga	PRDF	PRDF	1797
Arrarás	PCE	PCE	1777
Milla	PCE	PCE	1768
González Moros	PCE	PCE	1731
Peña	PRDF	PRDF	1716
Labrador	PCE	PCE	1713
Taramona	PR	DLR	1653
Alvarez	PRRSRev	PRRSRev	1611
Saornil	PRDF	PRDF	1591
Perea	PRDF	PRDF	1500
Orive	PRDF	PRDF	1479
Godoy	PR	DLR	1435
Martín del Campo	PR	DLR	1376
García Yepes	PR	DLR	1343
De Miguel	PRDF	PRDF	1287
Rubio	PR	DLR	1220
Vázquez	PRRSRev	PRRSRev	1189
Pastor	PRRSRev	PRRSRev	1161
García Caballero	PRRSRev	PRRSRev	1131
Joaquín Maurín	BOC	BOC	801
Ruiz Acebedo	BOC	BOC	785
Gil López	BOC	BOC	649
Fernández Mula	BOC	BOC	601
Rojas	BOC	BOC	566
Portela	BOC	BOC	549
García Miranda	BOC	BOC	541
Tejedo	BOC	BOC	501
García Palacios	BOC	BOC	466
Burgos	BOC	BOC	451

2º round results (Note: To cover a vacancy)
Candidate	Alliance	Party	Votes
Luis Bello	CRS	AR	47.855
Ángel Herrera Oria	-	AN	617

3º round results (Note: To replace Melquíadez Álvarez)
Candidate	Alliance	Party	Votes
Manuel Bartolomé Cossio	CRS	Ind.	56.401
José Antonio Primo de Rivera	-	Ind.	28.518
José Bullejos	-	PCE	5.983

=== Madrid (province) ===
9 seats.

- Republican-Socialist Conjunction (PSOE+PRRS+AR+PRR+PRDF) 70.841 Votes.
- National Action (AN) 14.161 Votes.
- Liberal Republican Right (DLR) 13.918 Votes.
- Independent Federal list (PRDF) 1.336 Votes.

1º round results
Candidate	Alliance	Party	Votes
Luis Fernández Clérigo	CRS	AR	70.841
Eugenio Arauz Bayardo	CRS	PRDF	70.112
Clara Campoamor y Rodríguez	CRS	PRR	68.470
Mariano Rojo González	CRS	PSOE	68.241
Antonio Fernández Quer	CRS	PSOE	68.110
Amós Acero Pérez	CRS	PSOE	67.269
Victoria Kent Siano	CRS	PRRS	65.254
Javier Martín Artajo	-	AN	14.161
Alfredo Aleix Mateo-Guerrero	-	DLR	13.918
José Valiente Soriano	-	AN	13.888
Rafael Esparza García	-	AN	13.298
Federico Magriñá	-	DLR	12.760
Eusebio Criado	-	Ind.	5.800
Niembro	-	PRDF	1.336
Fernández Arias	-	PRDF	968
García Iniesta	-	PRDF	821
Valeriano Rico	-	PRDF	695
Pedro Tonceda	-	Ind.	665
Wifredo Furio	-	PRDF	455
González Luaces	-	PRDF	364
Sánchez Roca	-	Ind.	256

2º round results (Note: To cover two vacancies)
Candidate	Alliance	Party	Votes
José Luis Martín de Antonio	CRS	PRRS	20.631
Manuel Torres Campañá	CRS	PRR	16.927
Francisco de Cantos Abad	-	PRDF	2.748
Javier Martín Artajo	-	AN	138

=== Guadalajara ===
4 seats.

- Republican-Socialist Conjunction (PSOE+PRRS+AR) 24.351 Votes.
- Liberal Monarchist list (Lib) 18.493 Votes.
- Agrarian Catholic list (CatAgr) 7.364 Votes.
- Republican right list (DLR) 6.253 Votes
- Agrarian Republican List (A) 5.939 Votes
- Independent Catholic list 1.852 Votes.

1º round results
Candidate	Alliance	Party	Votes
José Serrano Batanero	CRS	AlRep (Note: He'll join Republican Action's parliamentary group)	24.351
Marcelino Martín González del Arco	CRS	PSOE	23.700
Álvaro de Figueroa y Torres	–	Lib	18.493
Eduardo Ortega y Gasset (Note: Resigned)	CRS	PRRS	17.775
Hilario Yaben	–	CatAgr	10.144
José Arizcun	–	CatAgr	9.410
José Monedero	–	A	7.364
Luis Casuso	–	DLR	6.253
Antonio Moscoso	–	DLR	5.943
Ignacio Cerezo	–	A	5.939
Manuel Machimbarrena	–	Ind.	3.124
Francisco Barrera	–	Ind.	1.852
Luis Barrena	–	Ind.	1.286
Manuel Altimiras	–	Ind.	798

2º round results (Note: To replace Ortega y Gasset)
Candidate	Alliance	Party	Votes
Miguel Bargalló	–	PSOE	16.227
Álvaro de Figueroa y Alonso-Martínez	–	Lib	15.207
Jose María Arauz	–	AN	6.227
Luisa Casosa	–	Ind.	1.532
Vicente Relaño	–	Ind.	127

=== Cuenca ===
6 seats.

- Republican-Socialist Conjunction (PSOE+PRR+AR+DLR) 33.630 Votes.
- Union of the Right (A+AN) 25.837 Votes.
- Liberal Democrat Republican Party (PRLD) 19.451 Votes.

Electoral results
Candidate	Alliance	Party	Votes
Carlos Blanco	CRS	DLR	33.630
José Sánchez-Covisa	CRS	DLR (Note: He'll later join Republican Action)	31.152
José María Álvarez Mendizábal	CRS	DLR (Note: He'll later join the Radical Republican Party)	28.297
Aurelio Almagro	CRS	PSOE	27.008
Joaquín Fanjul	Right	A	25.387
Modesto Gosálvez	Right	AN	21.952
Tomás Sierra	-	PRLD	19.451
Marín Lázaro	Right	AN	19.147
Enrique Cuartero	Right	AN	11.756
José Ochoa	-	DLR	4.507
Aurelio Ruíz	-	DLR	4.447
Antonio Benítez	-	Ind.	3.563
Obdulio Ramírez	-	PRLD	3.056
López Malo	-	Ind.	208

=== Toledo ===
10 seats.

- Republican-Socialist Conjunction (PSOE+PRRS+PRR) 53.301 Votes.
- National Action (AN) 31.576 Votes.
- Republican Action (AR) 27.078 Votes.
- Republican Coalition (PRR+DLR) (Note: The national leadership of the Radical Republican Party favored a coalition with the Liberal Republican Right and formed the Republican Coalition. The provincial leadership and the party's youth disapproved of this and joined the socialists to form the Republican-Socialist Conjunction.) 27.369 Votes.
- Agrarian list (A) 15.351 Votes.
- Communist list (PCE) 959 Votes.

Electoral results
Candidate	Alliance	Party	Votes
Perfecto Díaz Alonso	CRS	PRR	54.301
Fermín Blázquez	CRS	PSOE	53.214
Domingo Alonso Jimenez	CRS	PSOE	52.740
José Ballester Gozalvo	CRS	PRRS	52.276
Emilio Palomo	CRS	PRRS	51.663
Anastasio de Gracia	CRS	PSOE	51.624
Pedro Riera Vidal	CRS	PRR	50.782
Félix Fernández Villarrubia	CRS	PSOE	50.286
Dimas de Madariaga	-	AN	31.576
Ramón Molina Nieto	-	AN	29.429
Antonio Vélez y Fernández de la Torre	CR	DLR	27.369
Manuel Azaña	-	AR	27.078
Heliodoro Suárez Inclán	CR	DLR	25.941
Manuel Álvarez Ugena	-	AR	23.355
Francisco Gómez Hidalgo	CR	DLR	21.324
Miguel Maura	CR	DLR	21.506
Alejandro Lerroux	CR	PRR	18.936
Francisco Valdés Casas	-	AR	18.444
Luis Bello	-	AR	16.282
Francisco Martín de Nicolás	CR	PRR	15.535
Tomás Elorrieta y Artaza	CR	RSA	15.351
Antonio Hermosilla	CR	PRR	6.130
José Quilis	-	A	1.651
Virgilio Carretero Maenza	–	PCE	959

=== Ciudad Real ===
10 seats.

- Republican-Socialist Conjunction (PSOE+PRRS+AlRep) 47.401 Votes
- Republican and Radical Right list (DLR+PRR) 44.864 Votes
- Liberal Democrat Republican Base List (PRLD+DLR+A) 22.662 Votes
- Independent Agrarian list 6.12 Votes

Candidate	Alliance	Party	Votes
Fernando Piñuela Romero	CRS	PSOE	47.401
Eduardo Ortega y Gasset	CRS	PRRS	45.718
Aurelio Lerroux	RightRep	PRR	44.864
Gumersindo Alberca Montoya	CRS	AlRep (Note: He'll later join the Radical Republican Party)	44.646
Antonio Cañizares Peñalva	CRS	PSOE	44.289
Emilio Antonio Cabrera Toba	CRS	PSOE	43.930
Pedro Vicente Gómez Sánchez	CRS	AlRep (Note: He'll later join the Radical Republican Party)	43.434
Joaquín Pérez Madrigal	CRS	PRRS	42.947
Cirilo del Río Rodríguez	RightRep	DLR	36.144
Manuel Ossorio Florit	RightRep	DLR	30.058
Germán Inza Álvarez	RightRep	PRR	29.512
Daniel Mondéjar Fúnez	RightRep	DLR	29.470
Alfonso Torán de la Rad	LD	PRLD	22.662
Isaac de Lis Aguado	RightRep	PRR	22.151
José Luis Rodríguez López	RightRep	PRR	19.578
José García Caminero	RightRep	DLR	19.054
Tomás Romero Moreno Martín Toledano	LD	PRLD	18.770
Luis Jordana Soler	LD	DLR	8.931
Luis de Zulueta y Escolano	LD	PRLD	8.289
José Manuel Pedregal	LD	PRLD	8.027
Ramón Álvarez-Valdés	LD	PRLD	7.514
Enrique de Santiago	-	Ind.	6.265
Ramón Díez de Rivera Casares	Ind.	A	6.102
José Manuel de Bayo González	LD	A	6.096
Adolfo González Posada	LD	PRLD	5.005
Francisco Martínez Ramírez	-	Ind.	4.592
José Puebla Periañes	-	Ind.	3.268
Huberto Domínguez López	-	Ind.	1.655

== Extremadura ==
=== Cáceres ===
9 seats.

- Republican-Socialist Conjunction (PSOE+PRRS) 46.995 Votes.
- Radical Republican Party (PRR+AR) 39.577 Votes.
- Republican Conjunction of Cáceres (PRR+DLR) 17.473 Votes
- Independent Agrarian list: 15.597 Votes.
- Independent Catholic list: 14.556 Votes.
- Agrarian League: (A) 9.418 Votes
- National Action (AN) 6.802 Votes
- Republicans at the Service of the People (RSP) 3.742 Votes.

1º round results
Candidate	Alliance	Party	Votes
Ángel Rubio Muñoz-Bocanegra	CRS	PSOE	46.995
Antonio Canales González	CRS	PSOE	46.439
Juan Canales González	CRS	PSOE	44.944
Antonio de la Villa Gutiérrez	CRS	PRRS	44.451
Ángel Segovia Burillo	CRS	PRRS	41.800
Antonio Sacristán Colás	CRS	PSOE	41.755
José Fernando González Uña	CRS	PSOE	39.615
José Giral Pereira	PRR	AR	39.577
Alejandro Lerroux García (Note: Resigns)	PRR	PRR	37.331
Juan Aguilera Estebán	PRR	PRR	32.930
Teodoro Pascual Cordero	PRR	PRR	31.958
Manuel Torres Campañá	PRR	PRR	29.795
Antonio Gallego	PRR	PRR	24.474
Vicente Gaspar	PRR	PRR	23.593
Andrés Sánchez de la Rosa	CRC	DLR	17.473
José Rosado y Gil	CRC	PRR	16.824
Juan Muñoz Casilias	-	Ind.	15.597
José Polo Benito	-	Ind.	14.556
Víctor Berjano Gómez	-	A	9.418
Fernando Vega Bermejo	-	AN	6.802
Domingo Martín Javato	-	A	5.287
Mario Plasencia Wright	-	RSP	3.762
Fernando Pérez Bueno	-	AN	3.724
Honorio Valentín Gamazo	-	AN	3.529
Marcelino González	-	AN	2.880
Joaquín Dicenta Alonso	-	RSP	2.766
Gerardo Rivas	-	RSP	1.691
Gustavo Pittaluga	-	Ind.	985
Eduardo Hernández Pacheco	-	RSP	273
Mario Roso de Luna	-	RSP	244
Salvador Sediles	-	RSP	182

2º round results
Candidate	Alliance	Party	Votes
Pablo Valiente Paredes	-	PSOE	37.371
Juan Aguilera Esteba	-	PRR	25.852

=== Badajoz ===
14 seats.

- Republican-Socialist Conjunction (PSOE+PRRS+PRDF+PRR+DLR) 134.634 Votes.
- National Action (AN) 11.492 Votes.
- Liberal Republican Right (DLR) 9.370 Votes.

1º round results
Candidate	Alliance	Party	Votes
Narciso Vázquez Lemus	CRS	PRDF	134.634
José Salmerón García	CRS	PRRS	132.555
Diego Hidalgo Durán	CRS	PRR	132.471
Gustavo Pittaluga Fattorini	CRS	DLR	131.637
Rafael Salazar Alonso	CRS	PRR	131.602
Narciso Vázquez Torres	CRS	PSOE	129.372
Juan Morán Bayo (Note: Resigned)	CRS	PSOE	128.026
Rodrigo Almada Rodríguez	CRS	PSOE	127.957
Francisco Núñez Tomás	CRS	PSOE	127.485
Juan Simeón Vidarte Franco-Romero	CRS	PSOE	127.419
Celestino García Santos	CRS	PSOE	127.382
Enrique Vázquez Camarasa	-	AN	11.492
Antonio Reyes Huertas	-	AN	10.232
José María Pemán Pemartín	-	AN	10.171
Federico Carlos Bas Vassallo	-	DLR	9.370
Mario Baselga Recarte	-	DLR	6.633
Juan García Romero de Tejada	-	DLR	6.215
Victorino Maesso Miralpeix	-	DLR	5.306
Salvador Díaz Berrio	-	DLR	4.708
Sources:

- Socialist list (PSOE) 76.899 Votes
- Radical list (PRR) 24.084 Votes
- Radical Socialist list (PRRS) 5.062 Votes
- Liberal Democrat Republican Party (PRLD) only on the 3º round 23.365 Votes

2º round results (Note: To cover three vacancies)
Candidate	Alliance	Party	Votes
Manuel Muiño Arroyo	PSOE	PSOE	76.899
Luis de Zulueta y Escolano	PSOE	Ind.	61.549
Juan Zugazagoitia Mendieta	PSOE	PSOE	59.347
Manuel Barbosa García	-	PRR	24.084
Fernando Miranda Quiñones	-	PRRS	5.062
Alfonso Márquez Bravo	-	PRRS	4.345
Antonio Arqueros Garrido	-	PRR	453
Alejandro Lerroux García	-	PRR	202
Pedro Carrasco Garrorena	-	Ind.	149

3º round results (Note: To replace Morán Bayo)
Candidate	Alliance	Party	Votes
Margarita Nelken Mansberger	-	PSOE	59.783
José María Pedregal	-	PRLD	23.365
Juan Miranda	-	Ind.	4.892

== Andalucía ==
=== Huelva ===
7 seats.

- Republican-Socialist Conjunction (PSOE+PRR+PRDF) 35.781 Votes.
- Republican Coalition (DLR+PRDF) (Note: The official candidates of the PRDF are Barriobero, Soriano and Pi y Arsuaga, the latter would retire from the electoral race. Luis Cordero Bel, from the PRDF, would be a part of the CRS candidature motu propio.) 13.634 Votes.
- Republican Right list (DLR) (Note: The national leadership of the DLR would disapprove the provincial leadership's decision to form a coalition with the PRDF. As a result of this, they would present an alternative electoral list.) 18.169 Votes.
- Liberal Democrat Republican Party (PRLD) 5.743 Votes.
- Radical Socialist list (PRRS) 3.963 Votes.

Electoral results
Candidate	Alliance	Party	Votes
Fernando Rey Mora	CRS	PRR	35.781
Luis Cordero Bel	CRS	PRDF	35.052
Florentino Martínez Torner	CRS	PSOE	31.476
José Terrero	CRS	PRR	31.033
Ramón González Peña	CRS	PSOE	30.158
Luis Velasco	CRS	PRR	27.939
Agustín Marcos Escudero	CRS	PSOE	26.976
Manuel de Burgos y Mazo (Note: Forms part of both the Republican Coalition and the DLR lists.)	CR	DLR	18.189
Eduardo Barriobero y Herranz	CR	PRDF	13.634
Guillermo Moreno Calvo	-	DLR	12.262
Francisco Vázquez Limón	CR	DLR	9.261
Rodrigo Soriano	CR	PRDF	8.047
Alfredo Malo Zarco	CR	DLR	6.418
José Marchena Colombo	-	PRLD	5.743
José Coto Mora	-	DLR	4.941
Antonio Vázquez Limón	-	Ind.	4.094
Victoria Kent Siano	-	PRRS	2.963
Juan Quintero	-	Ind.	230

=== Seville (city) ===
6 seats.

- Republican-Socialist Conjunction (PSOE+IR (Note: The Republican Left Party of Seville was associated with the Radical Republican Party)) 30.482 Votes.
- Revolutionary Republican Candidature (IRA+PRRSR) 10.839 Votes.
- National Action (AN) 6.731 Votes.
- Radical Socialist list (PRRS) 5.330 Votes.
- Communist list (PCE) 5.211 Votes.
- Federal Republicans list (PRDF) 1.840 Votes.
- Independent Socialists list (PSOE) 1.292 Votes.
- Independent Agrarian list (A) 75 Votes
- Liberal Democrat Republican Party (PRLD) 14 Votes
- Agrarian list (A) (Note: Supported by National Action) only on the 3º round 9.971 Votes

Resultados de la 1º ronda
Candidate	Alliance	Party	Votes
Diego Martínez Barrio	CRS	IR	30.482
Rodrigo Fernández y García de la Villa	CRS	IR	25.880
Ramón González Sicilia y de la Corte	CRS	IR	24.847
Hermenegildo Casas Jiménez	CRS	PSOE	22.431
Ramón Franco Bahamonde (Note: Resigns)	CRR	Ind.	10.839
José Antonio Balbontín	CRR	PRRSR	9.538
Blas Infante	CRR	Ind.	7.800
Antonio Rexach Fernández	CRR	-	7.736
Jesús Pabón y Suárez de Urbina	-	AN	6.731
Álvaro de Albornoz Liminiana	-	PRRS	5.330
Manuel Adame Misa	-	PCE	5.211
José Bullejos Sánchez	-	PCE	5.088
Manuel Sánchez Suárez	-	PRRS	4.282
Antonio Ponte	-	PRRS	3.133
José Castro Rosas	-	PRRS	2.695
Antonio Rodríguez de la Borbolla	-	Ind.	1.915
Rodrigo Soriano	-	PRDF	1.840
Manuel Blasco Garzón	-	Ind.	1.327
Carlos Cuerda	Ind.	PSOE	1.292
Angeles Montesinos	-	PCE	991
Justo Feria Salvador	-	PRDF	901
Manuel Roldán Jiménez	-	PCE	710
José Jiménez Ferrero	-	A	75
José González Cardos	Ind.	PSOE	27
José Maria Sevilla Delgado	-	PRLD	14

2º round results (Note: To cover a vacancy)
Candidate	Alliance	Party	Votes
José Domínguez Barbero	-	IR	16.697
Manuel Sánchez Juárez	-	PRRS	3.666
Manuel Adame Misa	-	PCE	2.727

3º round results (Note: To replace Franco)
Candidate	Alliance	Party	Votes
José Antonio Balbontín	-	PRRSR	10.955
José Huesca	-	A	9.971
Antonio Montaner	-	IR	7.210
José Bullejos	-	PCE	3.466
Martín Pedroso	-	PSOE	2.478
Ricardo Majó	-	AR	146
Barba	-	Ind.	43
Gutiérrez Ravé	-	Ind.	41

=== Seville (province) ===
10 seats.

- Republican-Socialist Conjunction (PSOE+IR (Note: The Republican Left Party of Seville was associated with the Radical Republican Party)) 57.940 Votes.
- Liberal Republican Right (DLR) 38.258 Votes
- Revolutionary Republican Candidature (IRA+PRRSR) 12.094 Votes.
- National Action (AN) 8.687 Votes.
- Independent Republican list 6.772 Votes
- Communist list (PCE) 1.861 Votes.
- Federal list (PRDF) 1.158 Votes
- Radical Socialist list (PRRS) 1.080 Votes

Candidate	Alliance	Party	Votes
Manuel Olmedo Serrano	CRS	PSOE	57.940
Ricardo Crespo	CRS	IR	57.014
Mariano Moreno Mateos	CRS	PSOE	54.776
José Marcial Dorado	CRS	IR	54.064
Miguel García Bravo Ferrer	CRS	IR	53.942
José Aceituno de la Cámara	CRS	IR	51.105
Juan Revilla García	CRS	IR	50.458
Eladio Fernández Egocheaga	CRS	PSOE	43.432
Federico Fernández Castijos	-	DLR	38.258
José Centeno González	-	DLR	36.798
Ramón Franco Bahamonde	CRR	Ind.	12.094
José Huesca	-	AN	8.687
Pedro Solís	-	AN	8.360
Adolfo Carretero	Ind.	PSOE	7.325
José Monge	-	AN	7.297
Adolfo Moreno	Ind.	PSOE	7.000
Barrio	-	Ind.	6.772
Blas Infante	CRR	Ind.	5.955
José Luis Illanes	-	AN	5.713
José Antonio Balbontín	CRR	PRRSR	4.716
Pascual Carrión	CRR	-	4.632
Pablo Rada	CRR	-	4.627
Antonio Rexach Fernández	CRR	-	4.611
Ignacio Infantes	CRR	-	4.585
Enrique Castells	CRR	-	4.314
José María Osuna	-	PCE	1.861
José Bullejos Sánchez	-	PCE	1.769
Suárez Moreno	-	Ind.	1.700
Ballesteros	-	Ind.	1.500
Gabriel León Trilla	-	PCE	1.360
Manuel Adame Misa	-	PCE	1.300
Justo Feria Salvador	-	PRDF	1.158
Manuel Lozano	-	PRRS	1.080
Enrique López Martínez	-	PRRS	987
José Chamizo	-	PCE	757
Pedroso	-	Ind.	687
Manuel García Pérez	-	PCE	667
Manuel Pérez Crespo	-	PRRS	660
Antonio Vallejos	-	PRRS	568
José Díaz Ramos	-	PCE	423

=== Cádiz ===
10 seats.

- Republican-Socialist Conjunction (PSOE+PRRS+PRR+DLR+IRA+PRAut) 56.718 Votes.
- Independent Right list (A+CT)
- Radical Lerrouxist list (RadLerr)
- Cadiz Candidacy for the Defense of the Republic (PRDF) 5.665 Votes.

Electoral results
Candidate	Alliance	Party	Votes
Antonio Roma y Rubíes	CRS	PSOE	56.718
Fermín Aranda y Fernández-Caballero	CRS	PRR	56.258
Juan Antonio Santander Carrasco	CRS	PSOE	54.343
Manuel Moreno Mendoza	CRS	PRR	52.572
Emilio Sola Ramos	CRS	PRAut (Note: He'll later join the Radical Republican Party)	52.408
Santiago Rodríguez Piñero	CRS	PRR	51.621
Manuel Muñoz Martínez	CRS	PRRS	49.359
Adolfo Chacón de la Mata	CRS	IRA (Note: He'll later join the Radical Republican Party)	44.750
Pedro Molpeceres Ramos	CRS	PSOE	43.654
Francisco Aramburu e Inda	CRS	DLR	34.907
Juan Manuel Sánchez Caballero	RadLerr	PRR	11.758
Francisco Mier Terán	Right	A	6.898
Manuel Fal Conde	Right	CT	6.774
Enrique Ocio y López de Haro	RadLerr	PRR	6.451
Dionisio Pérez Gutiérrez	-	PRDF	5.665
Rafael Pereira Chacón	-	PRDF	3.028
José Llaudaró Piñol	-	Ind.	1.220

=== Córdoba (city) ===
2 seats.

- Socialist list (PSOE) 7.665 Votes
- Republican Coalition (PRAut) (Note: Supported by the Liberal Republican Right and the Radical Socialist Republican Party) 6.503 Votes
- Communist list (PCE) 500 Votes

Electoral results
Candidate	Alliance	Party	Votes
Joaquín García-Hidalgo Villanueva	-	PSOE	7.665
Eloy Vaquero Cantillo (Note: He'll later join the Radical Republican Party)	CR	PRAut	6.503
José Sánchez Guerra	-	Ind.	2.708
Ramón Casanellas	-	PCE	>500

=== Córdoba (province) ===
10 seats.

- Socialist list (PSOE+ASR) 71.626 Votes.
- Republican Coalition (PRRS+PRAut+DLR) 40.584 Votes.
- National Action (AN) 14.768 Votes.
- Communist list (PCE) 5.421 Votes.

Candidate	Alliance	Party	Votes
Juan Díaz del Moral	PSOE	ASR	71.626
Juan Morán Bayo	PSOE	PSOE	57.610
Francisco Azorín Leftuierdo	PSOE	PSOE	56.115
Wenceslao Carrillo Alonso	PSOE	PSOE	55.556
Martín Sanz	PSOE	PSOE	54.562
Gabriel Morón Díaz	PSOE	PSOE	53.696
Vicente Fernández Rizo	PSOE	PSOE	50.358
Francisco Zafra	PSOE	PSOE	49.129
Ramón Carreras Pons (Note: He'll later join the Radical Republican Party)	CR	PRAut	40.584
Antonio Jaén Morente (Note: He'll later join the Radical Socialist Republican Party)	CR	DLR	40.172
José Luna	CR	PRAut	36.972
Rafael Delgado Benítez	CR	DLR	36.830
Manuel Ruiz Maya	CR	PRRS	32.224
Rafael Sánchez Guerra	CR	DLR	31.869
Ramón Rubio	CR	PRRS	31.595
Blas Infante	CR	PRAut	22.607
José Medina Togores	-	AN	14.768
José Manuel Gallegos Rocafull	-	AN	14.614
Manuel Hilario Ayuso	-	PRDF	9.235
Antonio Porras	-	PRDF	8.797
Ramón Casanellas	-	PCE	5.615
Landelino Moreno	-	PRDF	5.611
Joaquín Pi y Arsuaga	-	PRDF	5.581
Adriano Romero	-	PCE	5.200
Manuel Roldán Jiménez	-	PCE	5.124
Manuel Adame Misa	-	PCE	5.421
José Boulesos Sánchez	-	PCE	4.750
José Sánchez Gallardo	-	PCE	4.499
Diego López Cubero	-	PRDF	4.305
Miguel Caballero Vaca	-	PCE	4.057
Daniel Ortega	-	PCE	3.767
Federico Fernández de Castillejo	Ind.	DLR	2.988

=== Jaén ===
13 seats.

- Socialist list (PSOE+ASR) 85.551 Votes.
- Liberal Republican Right (DLR) 46.188 Votes.
- National Action (AN)
- Radical Socialist list (PRRS)
- Federal Republicans list (PRDF)
- Radical list (PRR)
- Communist list (PCE)

1º round results (Note: Only the data of the Socialist List and the DLR are preserved.)
Candidate	Alliance	Party	Votes
Jerónimo Bugeda Muñoz	PSOE	PSOE	83.551
Enrique Esbrí	PSOE	PSOE	82.483
Alejandro Peris Caruana	PSOE	PSOE	81.195
José Morales Robles	PSOE	PSOE	81.195
José Ortega y Gasset (Note: Resigned)	PSOE	ASR	80.191
Juan Lozano Ruiz	PSOE	PSOE	79.817
Tomás Álvarez Angulo	PSOE	PSOE	77.992
Anastasio de Gracia (Note: Resigned)	PSOE	PSOE	77.235
Andrés Domingo Martínez	PSOE	PSOE	76.888
Lucio Martínez Gil	PSOE	PSOE	61.497
Niceto Alcalá-Zamora	-	DLR	46.188
Enrique del Castillo Folache	-	DLR	39.606
Federico Castillo Estremera	-	DLR	39.112
Nicolás Alcalá Espinosa	-	DLR	37.609
A. Sánchez López	-	DLR	36.649
Eladio Sebastián Leftuierdo	-	DLR	30.825
Juan Menéndez	-	DLR	30.509
J. Antonio Torres	-	DLR	30.407
T. Pérez Padilla	-	DLR	29.622
Cirilo Tornos	-	AN	—
Conde de Vallellano	-	AN	—
Conde de Buelna	-	AN	—
Joaquín Ruíz Jiménez	-	AN	—
Felipe Sánchez-Román	-	PRRS	—
Evaristo Serrano	-	PRRS	—
Manuel Arenal	-	PRRS	—
Antonio Peragall	-	PRRS	—
Pablo Batmala	-	PRRS	—
Gabriel Bonilla	-	PRRS	—
Miguel Gallo	-	PRRS	—
Eugenio Navarro	-	PRRS	—
Ernesto Benítez	-	PRRS	—
Luis Zubillaga	-	PRDF	—
Fidel Martínez	-	PRDF	—
Augusto Vivero	-	PRDF	—
Rodrigo Soriano	-	PRDF	—
José Majo	-	PRR	—
E. Andicoberry	-	PRR	—
Manuel Adame Misa	-	PCE	—
José Bullejos Sánchez	-	PCE	—
V. Arroyo Pérez	-	PCE	—
Francisco Vilches	-	PCE	—
M. Caballero Vaca	-	PCE	—
Adriano Romero	-	PCE	—

2º round lists

- Socialist list (PSOE) 27.258 Votes
- Agrarian list (A) 15.982 Votes
- Progressive Republican Party (PRP) 8.304 Votes
- Republican Alliance (AlRep) 7.843 Votes
- Communist list (PCE) 2.066 Votes

2º round results (Note: To replace Ortega y Gasset and Anastasio de Gracia)
Candidate	Alliance	Party	Votes
José Piqueras	-	PSOE	27.258
Domingo de la Torre	-	PSOE	24.548
Nicolás Alcalá	-	A	15.982
Salvador Díaz Berrio	-	PRP	8.304
Pedro Llopis	-	AlRep	7.843
José Acuña	-	Ind.	3.027
José Bullejos	-	PCE	2.066

=== Málaga (city) ===
4 seats.

- Republican-Socialist Conjunction (PSOE+PRRS+PRR) 18.251 Votes.
- Federal Republican list (PRDF) 8.063 Votes.
- Communist list (PCE) 3.100 Votes.
- Anti-imperialist and Republican Left (IRyA) 3.033 Votes.
- Independent Monarchist list (MI) 1.794 Votes.
- Liberal Democrat Republican Party (PRLD) 537 Votes.
- Agrarian list (A) 88 Votes

Electoral results
Candidate	Alliance	Party	Votes
Antonio Fernández-Bolaños Mora	CRS	PSOE	18.251
Pedro Armasa Briales	CRS	PRR	15.746
Francisco Saval Moris	CRS	PRRS	15.609
Rodrigo Soriano Barroeta-Aldamar	-	PRDF	8.063
B. Ortega Muñoz	-	PRDF	7.337
Antonio Merino	-	PRDF	4.271
Federico González Oliveros	-	PRDF	4.110
Cayetano Bolívar	-	PCE	3.109
César Falcón	-	IRYA	3.033
G. Marsá	-	IRYA	2.150
Enrique Sánchez	-	PCE	1.870
F. Bergamín	-	MI	1.794
José Piaya	-	IRYA	1.672
Andrés Rodríguez	-	PCE	1.003
José Bores	-	MI	571
Carlos Rivero	-	PRLD	537
M. Pereá	-	A	88

=== Málaga (province) ===
8 seats.

- Republican-Socialist Conjunction (PSOE+PRRS+PRR+AR+AlRep) 53.887 Votes.
- Independent Socialist list (PSOE) 16.466 Votes
- Liberal Republican Right (DLR) 2.441 Votes.
- Communist list (PCE) 2.357 Votes.
- Lista Agrarios (A) 1.163 Votes.
- Andalucist list (And) 661 Votes.
- Federal Republican list (PRDF) 192 Votes.

Electoral results
Candidate	Alliance	Party	Votes
José María Molina Moreno	CRS	PSOE	53.887
Emilio Baeza Medina	CRS	PRRS	50.117
Antonio García Prieto	CRS	PSOE	48.665
Pedro Gómez Chaix	CRS	PRR	44.867
Bernardo Giner de los Ríos	CRS	AlRep (Note: He'll later join The Association of Service to the Republic)	44.334
José María Martínez Giménez	CRS	PRRS	44.078
Enrique Ramos Ramos	CRS	AR	43.259
José María Roldán Lafuente	CRS	AlRep (Note: He'll later join the Liberal Republican Right)	42.152
Sebastián Martínez Villarreal	Ind.	PSOE	16.466
Antonio Román Durán	Ind.	PSOE	4.004
Molina	-	DLR	2.441
Cayetano Bolívar	-	PCE	2.357
Andrés Rodríguez	-	PCE	2.187
José Ochoa	-	PCE	2.178
Enrique Sánchez	-	PCE	2.085
E. Bravo	-	A	1.163
Cristóbal Ruiz	-	A	1.085
J. Montaner	-	A	974
Mariano Rojo	-	Ind.	903
R. Jiménez	-	A	863
Rafael Bellido	-	A	752
Blas Infante	-	And	661
Federico Lozano	-	Ind.	308
Rodrigo Soriano	-	PRDF	192
Juan Sánchez	-	Ind.	147
Antonio España	-	Ind.	90

=== Granada (city) ===
3 seats.

- Republican-Socialist Conjunction (PSOE+PRAut) 16.006 Votes
- Radical Lerrouxist list (PRR) 595 Votes
- Communist list (PCE) 164 Votes

Electoral results
Candidate	Alliance	Party	Votes
Fernando de los Ríos Urruti	CRS	PSOE	16.006
José Pareja Yébenes (Note: He'll later join The Association of Service to the Republic)	CRS	PRAut	13.675
Juan José Santa Cruz (Note: He'll later join The Association of Service to the Republic)	CRS	PRAut	12.719
Manuel Torres López	-	Ind.	3.801
Juan Espejo Hinojosa	-	PRR	595
Manuel Adame Misa	-	PCE	164
José Guglieri Arenas	-	Ind.	164

=== Granada (province) ===
9 seats.

- Republican-Socialist Conjunction (PSOE+PRRS+ASR+AR+PRAut) (Note: supported by the Radical Republican Party) 60.607 Votes.
- Republican Right list (DLR+RadLerr) (Note: Presented by a dissident group of the DLR without authorization from the provincial committee together with several radicals opposed to the coalition with the socialists.) 9.310 Votes.
- Republican Rural Democracy (DRR) 9.310 Votes
- Independent Monarchist list (MI) 3.260 Votes.
- Agrarian list (A) 1.064 Votes
- Communist list (PCE) 438 Votes.
- Independent Socialist list (PSOE) only on the 2º round 4.488 Votes

1º round results
Candidate	Alliance	Party	Votes
Fernando Sainz Ruiz	CRS	PSOE	60.607
Alejandro Otero Fernández (Note: Resigned)	CRS	PSOE	59.058
Alfonso García Valdecasas	CRS	ASR	58.284
Luis Jiménez de Asúa	CRS	PSOE	58.236
José Palanco Romero	CRS	AR	56.660
Eduardo Ortega y Gasset (Note: Resigned)	CRS	PRRS	56.817
Manuel Jiménez García de la Serrana	CRS	PSOE	54.845
Luis López-Dóriga	CRS	Ind.	55.945
Enrique Fajardo (Note: He'll join the Independent Republican parliamentary group in the Cortes.)	CRS	PRAut	51.207
Rafael de Roda Jiménez	-	DRR	9.310
Eduardo de la Guardia y Ojea	-	DRR	6.549
Francisco González Carrascosa	DLR	DLR	6.207
José Puga Huete	DLR	DLR	6.181
Natalio Rivas Santiago	-	Ind.	5.019
Emilio Martínez Jerez	DLR	RadLerr	4.991
Félix Sánchez Eznarriaga	DLR	DLR	4.656
Juan Espejo Hinojosa	DLR	RadLerr	4.444
Francisco Sánchez Chacón	-	Ind.	3.697
Pío Suárez Inclán	-	MI	3.260
José Onieva Ramírez	DLR	DLR	2.836
Alfonso Labella Navarrete	DLR	DLR	1.674
Eduardo Vázquez Reyes	-	A	1.064
Manuel Pertiñez Mendigorri	-	A	974
Antonio Molina de Haro	-	Ind.	926
Horacio Roldán Quesada	-	A	851
José Villaverde	-	Ind.	697
Enrique Marín Forero	-	Ind.	574
José Luis de Vera	-	Ind.	497
Cuevas	-	Ind.	475
Manuel Adame Misa	-	PCE	438

2º round results (Note: To replace Otero and Ortega y Gasset)
Candidate	Alliance	Party	Votes
Juan Carreño Vargas	-	PSOE	25.848
Rafael García-Duarte Salcedo	-	PSOE	21.526
José Álvarez de Cienfuegos	-	Ind.	10.353
Narciso González Cervera	Ind.	PSOE	4.488
Manuel Muñoz Requena (Note: He withdraws from the electoral race on October 4.)	Ind.	PSOE	2.286
José Bullejos	-	PCE	404
José Antonio Primo de Rivera	-	Ind.	13
José Ruiz Morón	-	Ind.	4

=== Almería ===
7 seats.

- Socialist list (PSOE) 21.452 Votes
- Left Republican Parties' Conjunction (PRRS+PRR+PRDF) 21.116 Votes
- Liberal Republican Right (DLR) 15.241 Votes
- Independent Socialist list (PSOE) 9.434 Votes
- Right Independent list 9.408 Votes
- Liberal, Democratic and Catholic (LDC) 5.753 Votes
- Republican Action (AR) 3.514 Votes

1º round results
Candidate	Alliance	Party	Votes
Gabriel Pradal	-	PSOE	21.452
Antonio Tuñón de Lara	CIR	PRR	21.116
José Salmerón García (Note: Resigned)	CIR	PRRS	17.884
Nicolás Salmerón García	CIR	PRRS	16.801
Benigno Ferrer	-	PSOE	15.449
Rogelio Pérez	-	DLR	15.241
Miguel Granados Ruiz	CIR	PRRS	14.928
Juan Company	CIR	PRDF	14.218
Augusto Barcia Trelles	-	Ind.	11.815
Miguel Maura	-	DLR	11.452
Antonio Mairal	-	PSOE	10.891
Antonio Garrigues	Ind.	PSOE	9.434
Luis Giménez Canga-Argüelles	Right	Ind.	9.408
José Pérez Mateo	Right	Ind.	9.249
Martín Navarro	Ind.	PSOE	7.986
Laudelino Moreno	-	Ind.	7.482
Moisés Sánchez	-	PSOE	7.269
Alfredo de Zavala y Lafora	-	DLR	7.114
José Asenjo	-	PSOE	6.025
Simón Núñez	-	LDC	5.753
Miguel G. Algarra	-	Ind.	4.636
Fernando Morales	-	AR	3.514
José García Mateos	-	Ind.	1.354

2º round results (Note: To replace Salmerón)
Candidate	Alliance	Party	Votes
Juan Company	CIR	PRDF	20.008
Enrique de Santiago	-	PSOE	14.620
Jesús Ibram	-	Ind.	2.986
Vicente Arroyo Pérez	-	Ind.	218
José Antonio Primo de Rivera	-	Ind.	169

=== Ceuta ===
1 seat

- Radical Socialist Republican Party (PRRS) 2.083 Votes
- Radical Republican Party (PRR) 1.544 Votes
- Spanish Socialist Workers' Party (PSOE) 1.084 Votes
- Antifascist Republican Left (IRA) 703 Votes

Electoral results
Candidate	Alliance	Party	Votes
Antonio López Sánchez-Prado	–	PRRS	2.083
Rafael Vegazo Mancilla	–	PRR	1.544
Conrado Lajara Rubio	–	PSOE	1.084
Enrique Porres Fajardo	–	IRA	703

=== Melilla ===
1 seat

- Spanish Socialist Workers' Party (PSOE) 4.729 Votes
- Republican Union of Melilla (PUR) 3.173 Votes

Electoral results
Candidate	Alliance	Party	Votes
Antonio Acuña Carballar	–	PSOE	4.729
Carlos Echeguren Ocio	–	PUR (Note: The Party of Republican Union of Melilla was associated to the Radical Republican Party)	3.173

== Canary Islands ==
=== Las Palmas ===
5 seats.

- Republican-Socialist Conjunction (PSOE+PRDF+PRR) 26.661 Votes.
- Rightist independents' list (Note: Ángel Ossorio would end up asking his followers to abstain on election day.) 1.859 Votes
- Communist list (PCE) 157 Votes.
- Radical Socialist list (PRRS) 34 Votes

Electoral results
Candidate	Alliance	Party	Votes
Rafael Guerra del Río	CRS	PRR	26.661
Juan Negrín López	CRS	PSOE	26.119
Bernardino Valle Gracia	CRS	PRDF	26.056
José Franchy Roca	CRS	PRDF	25.669
Marcelino Pascua Martínez	CRS	PSOE	25.169
Juan Valdivia Garcia-Borrón	Right.	Ind.	1.851
Ángel Ossorio y Gallardo	Right.	Ind.	1.018
José Roca Ponsá	-	Ind.	735
Manuel Velázquez Mena	-	Ind.	665
Ramón Casanellas	-	PCE	157
Dolores Ibárruri	-	PCE	156
Manuel Adame Misa	-	PCE	154
José Bullejos Sánchez	-	PCE	152
Luis Benítez Luglott	-	Ind.	95
Rodrigo Soriano	-	PRRS	34
Ángel Rizo	-	PRRS	27

=== Santa Cruz de Tenerife ===
6 seats.

- Tenerife Republican Party (PRT) (Note: The Tenerife Republican Party was associated with the Radical Republican Party) 25.263 Votes.
- Socialist list (PSOE) 10.825 Votes.
- Social Democrat Republican Party (PRSD) 6.514 Votes
- Trade Unionist list 1.666 Votes.
- Popular list (Note: The Popular Candidature was composed of Gil-Roldán, from the PRT (Tenerife Republican Party), and Juan José Luque of the Trade Unionist List. However, it was presented without their consent.)
- Regionalist list 201 Votes
- Republican Right (DLR) 176 Votes.

First round results
Candidate	Alliance	Party	Votes
Alejandro Lerroux García (Note: Resigned)	-	PRT	25.263
Antonio Lara y Zárate	-	PRT	24.691
Alonso Pérez Díaz	-	PRT	21.691
Andrés Orozco Batista	-	PRT	21.350
Domingo Pérez Trujillo	-	PSOE	10.825
Andrés de Arroyo y González de Chaves	-	Ind.	8.293
Blas Pérez González	-	Ind.	7.576
Domingo Cabrera Cruz	-	PRSD	6.514
Ángel Capote Rodríguez	-	Ind.	5.593
Antonio Barroso León	-	PSOE	4.842
José Gerardo Martín Herrera	-	PSOE	4.603
Indalecio Prieto Tuero	-	PSOE	4.089
Juan José Luque Argenti	Pop.	Sind.	1.666
Ramón Gil-Roldán	Pop.	PRT	1.550
Juan Rumeo García	-	Ind.	736
Ricardo Ruiz y Benítez de Lugo	-	Ind.	413
José Gutierrez Penedo	-	Reg	201
Félix Benítez de Lugo	-	DLR	176

Second round results (Note: To replace Lerroux)
Candidate	Alliance	Party	Votes
Ramón Gil-Roldán y Martín	-	PRT	22.894
Antonio Barroso León	-	PSOE	5.337
