= Mariano Pardo de Figueroa =

Spanish philatelist (1828–1918)

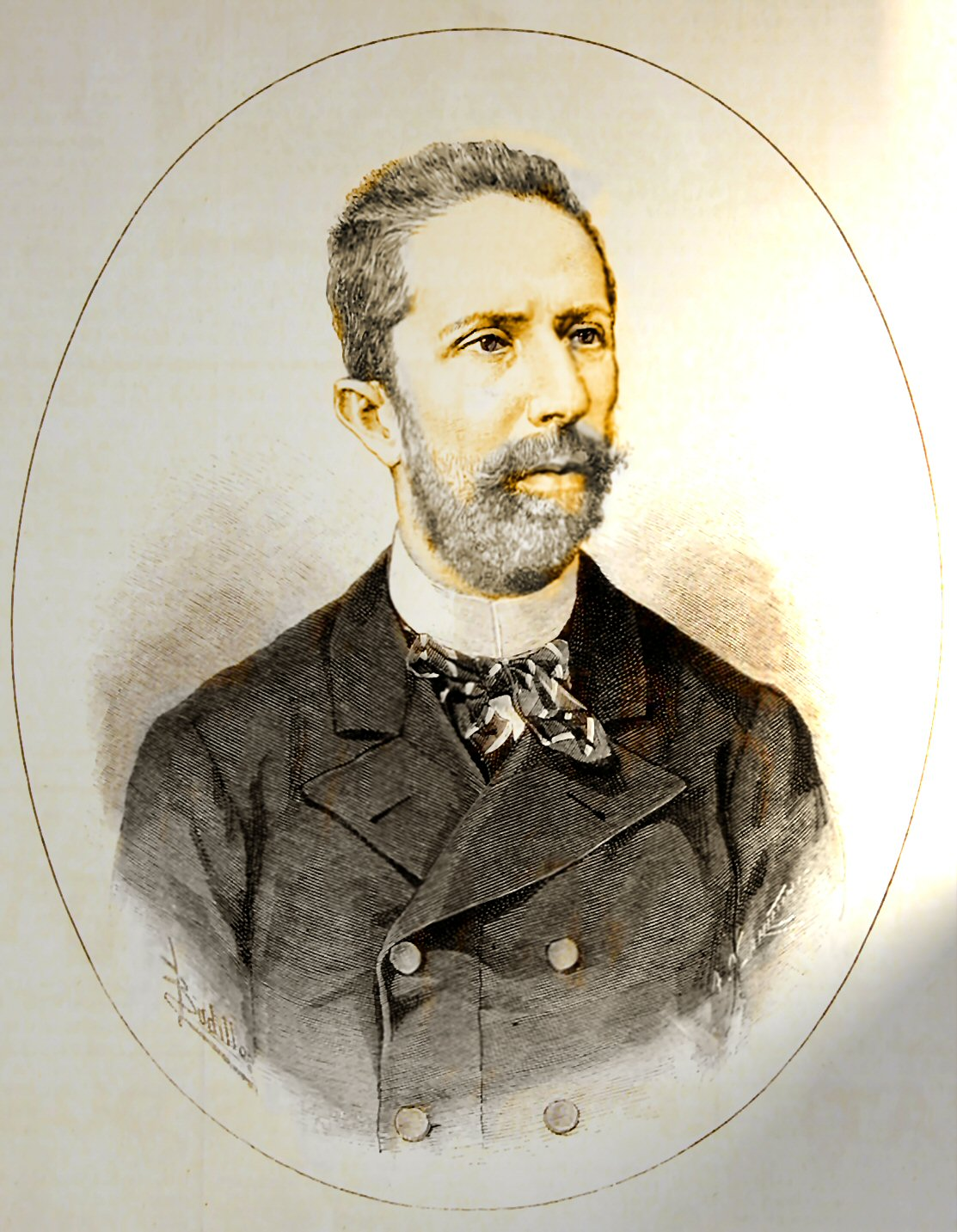
- Born: 18 November 1828
- Died: 11 December 1918 (aged 90)
- Occupation: Philatelist
- Writing career
- Pen name: Thebussem

Mariano Pardo de Figueroa of Medina (18 November 1828 – 11 December 1918), who used the nom-de-plume Dr. Thebussem (or Thebussen), was a Spanish nobleman and philatelist who was one of the "Fathers of Philately" entered on the Roll of Distinguished Philatelists in 1921. He was elected an Ordinary Member of The Philatelic Society, London, now the Royal Philatelic Society London, in 1870 and an Honorary Member of that Society in 1875, and as such he was one of the first members of the Society. Election as an honorary member probably related to the rule that once existed that full members should be resident in London.

According to Gibbons Stamp Weekly, de Figueroa was given the title of "Honorary Postman of Spain and her Possessions" for postal reforms in that country and the privilege of free postage for his services to science.

The pen name "Thebussem" was created from an anagram of "embustes" (Spanish for "lies" or "tall tales"), with an H and an S added to Germanize it.

The well-known Spanish writer Dionisio Pérez Gutiérrez chose to go by the pseudonym "Post-Thebussem" as a show of support for de Figueroa.

== Publications ==
- Literatura philatélica en España. Apuntes para la redaccion de un catálogo. 1876.
- La mesa moderna. 1888.
- Fruslerías postales. 1895.
- Algo de philatelia. 1899.
