= Dionisio Pérez Gutiérrez =

Spanish food writer (1872–1935)

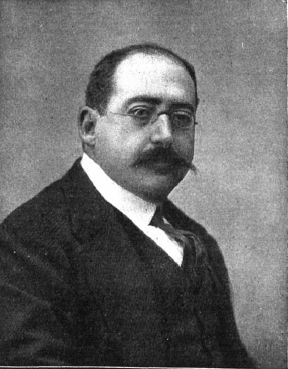
- Born: 1872; Grazalema, Cádiz
- Died: February 23, 1935 (aged 62–63); Madrid, Spain
- Occupation: Food writer
- Writing career
- Pen name: Post-Thebussem

Dionisio Pérez Gutiérrez (pseudonym Post-Thebussem) (born 1872 in Grazalema (Cádiz) - died 23 February 1935 in Madrid) was a Spanish writer, journalist, and gastronome. He has been called "one of Spain's most authoritative food writers" and was an early adopter of the term Hispanidad.

His pen name, "Post-Thebussem", was chosen as a show of support for Mariano Pardo de Figueroa, who went by the handle "Dr. Thebussem".

== Works ==
- Guía del buen comer español: inventario y loa de la cocina clásica de España y de sus regiones. Madrid: Imprenta de los Sucesores de Rivadeneyra, 1929
- La cocina clasica española; excelencias, amenidades, historias, recetarios. Obra póstuma. Prologue by Alberto Insúa. Madrid: Imp. y Libr. Ibero-Americana, 1936. (Posthumously published)
- Naranjas: el arte de prepararlas y comerlas. Estudio preliminar del Dr. Marañón y fórmulas recopiladas por Post-Thebussem. Madrid: Unión Nacional de Exportación Agrícola, 1930.

== See also ==
- Spanish cuisine
