= Teodomiro Menéndez =

Spanish politician

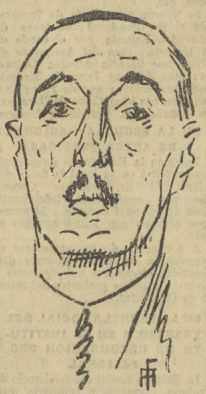
Portrait of Teodomiro Menéndez in 1927

Teodomiro Menéndez Fernández (1879 – 1978) was a Spanish politician and socialist syndicalist.

== Biography ==
Teodomiro Menéndez Fernández was born in Oviedo in 1879. He began to work at a very early age in the Weapons Factory of La Vega (Oviedo) obtaining his training attending to the classrooms of the University Extension ovetense. He started his career in politics by running for election to Oviedo City Hall in 1911. He was elected councillor. In 1919 he was elected deputy for the Cortes Generales (Spanish parliament). In 1917, as head of the railroad union, he promoted a railway strike in Asturias. After the strike was crushed by the army, he was arrested and jailed.

In 1931, during the government of the second republic, Teodomiro was elected deputy for the Cortes Generales for Oviedo and held the office of Public Works between 1932 and 1933, projecting the future rail links of Madrid.

In 1934, he participated in the strike of October 1934 being captured by the Moroccan troops and sentenced to death. He was jailed in the prison of El Dueso, Cantabria, until the victory of the Popular Front in the elections of February 1936 date in which it is released. In the civil war that followed the elections he fought on the republican side. Once the war finished, he went into exile in France in 1939 running away from prison. In 1940, following the Nazi occupation of France he was imprisoned in Bordeaux and returned to Spain. Once in Spain, he was sentenced to death for the second time. In 1950, after ten years in prison, he was released since his death sentence had been commuted to 30 years in prison thanks to the efforts of Ramón Serrano Suñer.

He died in Madrid in 1978 at the age of 99, after having been imprisoned sixteen times and sentenced to death twice, being buried in the civil cemetery of Madrid.

== Sources ==
- Tusell Gómez, Javier; Ruiz Manjón, Octavio; García Queipo de Llano, Genoveva (1981–1982). "Apéndices: los resultados electorales" [Appendices: the electoral results]. Revista de derecho político (in Spanish) (13). Madrid: Universidad Nacional de Educación a Distancia: 237–270. ISSN 0210-7562.
