= Spanish Agrarian Party =

Spanish Agrarian Party (in Spanish: Partido Agrario Español) was a political party in Spain during the Second Republic. Initially the party was known as Agrarian Party (Partido Agrario) but took the name PAE in the year 1934. It was officially founded on 1 February 1934.

PAE was a republican party, and it cooperated with centrist and rightwing parties. PAE took part in right-wing governments.

PAE had its base amongst small and medium farmers, and the party clearly opposed agrarian reform. The main base of the party was in Castilla y León.

The Youth of PAE published Vibración in Catalonia.

In the 1970s, the party was refounded. On October 4, 1976, it was one of the five first political parties to register. In the Spanish general election, 1977, it won 833 votes out of 18,324,333.
