= Gerardo Abad Conde =

Spanish politician and lawyer (1881–1936)

Minister of the Navy of Spain
- In office January 1935 – August 1935

Personal details
- Born: August 8, 1881 Ordes, A Coruña Province, Spain
- Died: September 10, 1936 (aged 55) Madrid, Spain
- Party: Radical Republican Party
- Other political affiliations: Partido Republicano Autónomo (early career)
- Occupation: Lawyer, politician, professor
- Known for: Plan Abad Conde for naval modernization (1935)

Gerardo Abad Conde (8 August 1881 – 10 September 1936) was a politician and lawyer from Spain. Born in Ordes in A Coruña Province he was Minister of the Navy during the Second Republic.

== Biography ==
He received a master's degree in law and practised it in A Coruña and was the chair for Mercantile Legislation and Maritime legislation in the School of Commerce in the city. In addition, he was director of the Nautical School. Politically, he initially belonged to the Partido Republicano Autónomo of A Coruña, becoming secretary in 1908. However, in the 1920s the party integrated into the Radical Republican Party led by Alejandro Lerroux.

Abad was councilman of his city in several legislatures, occupying the mayorship between the years 1918 - 1919. In 1930 he was involved in the Lestrove Pact in which, on 26 March 1930, the A Coruña municipality of Lestrove and political representatives aimed to create a Galician Republican Federation. In the elections to the constituent assembly in La Coruna in 1931, he was not selected; nevertheless, in the elections in Lugo, months later, he became deputy of that province.

In July 1933, he was elected to the Tribunal de Garantías Constitucionales (Court of Constitutional Guarantees). In early 1935, he became Minister of the Navy, and in July 1935, he was elected president of the Patronage for the Seizure of Jesuit Goods. Under his regime in the Ministry of the Navy, from 23 January to 3 April 1935 a plan of naval modernization was elaborated, published in the official newspaper on 6 April 1936. Named the Plan Abad Conde it included the construction of 12 torpedo boats, 8 minesweepers, 12 submarines, antisubmarine facilities, and arms and others. It also anticipated the modernization existing units in the Navy, beginning with armor and then updating the cruisers and destroyers. The plan amounted to 450 million pesetas to be put into operation over a five-year period, but due to the economic and politicians of the time was out of the question ".

In August 1935, Abad left the Ministry, becoming a university Professor of Philosophy and Law at the University of La Laguna in Tenerife, but later resigned under pressure. In 1936 he was a candidate to the general elections in February by the Radical Republican Party, but again was not chosen. On the outbreak of the Spanish Civil War, later that year he was assassinated in Madrid on 10 September 1936.
