= Eduardo Ortega y Gasset =

Spanish lawyer and politician (1882–1964)

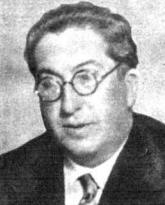

Prosecutor General of the Republic
- In office 10 December 1936 – 13 November 1937
- Preceded by: José Vallés Fortuño
- Succeeded by: Leopoldo Garrido Cavero

Civil Governor of Madrid
- In office April 1931 – June 1931

Personal details
- Born: 11 April 1882 Madrid, Spain
- Died: 25 February 1965 (aged 82) Caracas, Venezuela
- Occupation: Politician; lawyer; journalist

Eduardo Ortega y Gasset (1882 – 1965) was a Spanish politician, journalist and lawyer.

== Biography ==
Born in Madrid on 11 April 1882. He was the older brother of philosopher José Ortega y Gasset.

He became a member of the Congress of Deputies after the 1910 general election, in representation of the electoral district of Coín (province of Málaga). He joined the Liberal fraction. He renovated his seat at the 1914, 1916, 1918, 1919, 1920 and 1923 elections.

He joined the Freemasonry in 1922. During the dictatorship of Primo de Rivera, Ortega y Gasset self-exiled to Paris; he became there a close acquaintance of Miguel de Unamuno, collaborating along the latter and Blasco Ibáñez in the España con Honra magazine. He was one of the founders of the Radical Socialist Republican Party (PRRS) in 1929.

He was among the signatories of the Pact of San Sebastián on 17 August 1930.

On 15 April 1931, immediately after the proclamation of the Second Republic, he was appointed Civil Governor of the Province of Madrid. In June 1931, he was replaced as civil governor by Emilio Palomo Aguado. He ran as candidate for the 1931 Constituent election in the constituencies of Ciudad Real, Guadalajara and Granada; elected in the three constituencies, he chose to remain as legislator representing the first constituency.

He was expelled from the PRRS in 1932 along Juan Botella Asensi, chiefly on the basis of having repeatedly broke party discipline. They formed then the Izquierda Radical Socialista ("Radical Socialist Left"). By that time he was Master of the Logia Luis Simarro No. 3 in Madrid.

A target of right-wing terrorist groups, he suffered an attempt on his life on 7 April 1936, when a bomb hidden in a basket of eggs exploded in his residence at the calle de Rafael Calvo 12.

He was appointed Prosecutor General of the Republic in December 1936.

Exiled to Venezuela after the end of the Spanish Civil War, he died on 25 February 1965 in Caracas.

== Works ==
- — (1935). Etiopía. El conflicto italo-abisinio.
