= Eduardo Barriobero =

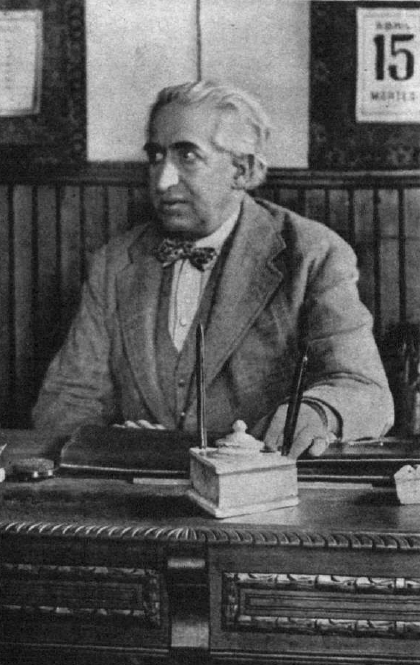
- Eduardo Barriobero (c. 1931)
- Born: 29 June 1875; La Rioja, Spain
- Died: 10 February 1939 (aged 63); Barcelona, Spain
- Cause of death: Execution by firing squad
- Occupations: Lawyer and activist in the Confederación Nacional del Trabajo

Eduardo Barriobero y Herrán (29 June 1875 –10 February 1939) was a lawyer and activist in the Confederación Nacional del Trabajo.

During the Spanish Civil War he became the presiding judge of the anarchists' "People's Tribunal" in Barcelona. He soon ran afoul of the Republican government, who accused him of embezzling some of the fines he collected.

He was captured by the Francoists in 1939, and in his subsequent trial, he denied being an anarchist, saying "I am not an anarchist. I am a radical anticlerical Freemason." However, his pleas did him no good, and he was executed by firing squad.
