= Juan Tizón =

Spanish politician and writer

Juan Tizón Herreros
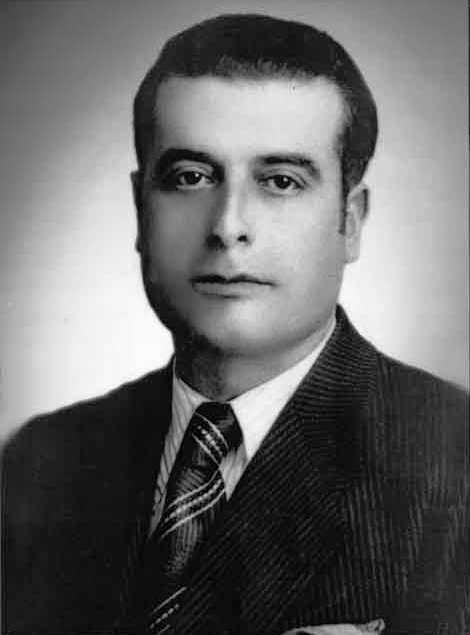
- Born: 23 January 1895; A Coruña, Spain
- Died: 25 December 1945 (aged 50); Porto, Portugal
- Occupations: railway worker, politician, writer
- Spouse: Herminia Ramos Ponte
- Children: Herminia, Isabel

Juan Tizón Herreros (23 January 1895 – 25 December 1945) was a Spanish politician and writer who was exiled during the Spanish Civil War.

== Political career ==
Juan Tizón Herreros was born on 23 January 1895 in A Coruña. He was a railway worker and was active in the Spanish Socialist Workers' Party (PSOE) and in the Unión General de Trabajadores (UGT) trade union. He led the local socialist group in La Coruña. Later he moved to Monforte de Lemos, and was appointed as branch secretary in the railway workers' section of the UGT.

In the general elections of 1931 he was elected as a PSOE deputy for Lugo Province to the national parliament. However, due to irregularities, the elections in that province were repeated and he lost his position. He also became an alternate member of the Federal Committee of the PSOE.

He became vice-president of the Lugo provincial government, and president of the first Republican management committee of Monforte de Lemos. During the uprising of 1934 he was arrested and spent some time in prison. He was mayor of Monforte de Lemos from 18 March to 20 July 1936.

== Exile ==
Upon the military rising of July 1936 he attempted to organise local resistance, by forming a militia and seizing weapons. After the declaration of war the town was occupied by the Civil Guard, compelling him to escape. He took refuge in Porto in Portugal at the home of Portuguese friends of his, among whom was Mário Soares. He died in that city in 1945 and is buried there. While in Portugal he worked for the British secret service.

All through the Franco period he was assumed in Monforte to have been killed by some Falangist death squad. This belief was supported by gunfire damage to a commemorative plaque on a fountain that he had installed.

== Writings ==
In 1925 he published a book of short stories in Spanish, Espiando al diablo (En: Spying on the devil). In 1937-38 he wrote a satirical poem in Galician, Seis cregos escollidos (Versos divinos) (En: Six chosen priests (divine verses)), published posthumously in 2001 by Xesús Alonso Montero.

In 2010 the Luis Tilve Foundation recompiled and published all of his hitherto unpublished work under the title of Juan Tizón Herreros. El pensamiento hecho palabra (En: Thought made into words). This work brings together: two plays on social themes, Casta Maldita and Civilización (En: Accursed Breed, Civilisation); two short stories, El cristo del hallazgo and Persecución (En: Christ Discovered and Persecution) - the latter recompiled by his son-in-law Raúl Solleiro Mella - in which he writes of his flight after the military rising; various articles; and an extended biography written by the historian Rosa María López González.
