= First government of Diego Martínez Barrio =

Government of the Second Spanish Republic

Fourth Government of the Spanish Republic
- Government of Spain
- 1933
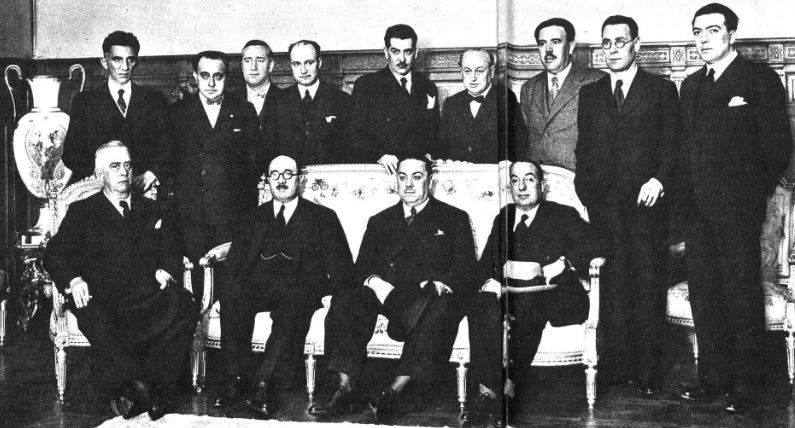
- The government in October 1933
- Date formed: 9 October 1933
- Date dissolved: 16 December 1933

People and organisations
- President: Niceto Alcalá-Zamora
- Prime Minister: Diego Martínez Barrio
- Total no. of members: 13
- Member parties: PRR; AR; PRRS; PRG; ERC; PRP; Radical Socialist Left (until 29 Nov)
- Status in legislature: Minority (multi-party)
- Opposition parties: PSOE
- Opposition leader: Indalecio Prieto

History
- Election: 1931 Spanish general election
- Predecessor: Lerroux I
- Successor: Lerroux II

The first government of Diego Martínez Barrio was formed on 9 October 1933, following the latter's appointment as Prime Minister of Spain by President Niceto Alcalá-Zamora and his swearing-in the same day. It succeeded the first government of Alejandro Lerroux and was the government of Spain from 9 October 1933 to 16 December 1933, a total of 69 days, or 2 months and 8 days.

The cabinet comprised members of the Radical Republican Party, the Radical Socialist Republican Party, Republican Action, the Republican Left of Catalonia, the Galician Republican Party, the Progressive Republican Party and the Radical Socialist Left.

The main purpose of the government was the organization of the next general elections to solve the parliamentary deadlock that arose as a result of the animosity between the left and the radicals, making impossible the formation of a new government. With its main purpose completed, the new government resigned after the elections.

== Formation ==
=== Overview ===
The Constitution of 1931 enshrined Spain as a semi-presidential republic, awarding the President of the Republic the capability of appointing government ministers at will unless the Cortes refused explicitly, that is to say, through a motion of no confidence. He could also inspect and ultimately control executive acts by granting or denying the signature of presidential decrees and dissolve the Cortes.

=== Round of consults ===
The President of the Republic, Alcalá-Zamora, held a round of negotiations as well as several individual interviews to solve the political crisis arising from Lerroux's resignation. The round of consults was carried out on 4 October and several interviews were carried out on 6 October and 7 October to seek solutions to the crisis after the failure of the successive candidates to form a governing coalition:

Consultations; President of the Republic
Date	Consultee	Office/position	Party
4 October 1933	Julian Besteiro	President of the Cortes	PSOE
4 October 1933	Mariano Ruiz-Funes	Member of Republican Action	AR
4 October 1933	Marcelino Domingo	Minister of Governance	PRRSI
4 October 1933	Miquel Santaló (1º time)	Minister of Communications Leader of the Catalan Left Group	ERC
4 October 1933	Félix Gordón Ordás	Leader of the Radical Socialist Republican Party	PRRS
4 October 1933	Remigio Cabello Toral	Leader of the Socialist Republican Group	PSOE
4 October 1933	Miguel Maura	Leader of the Conservative Republican Party	PRC
4 October 1933	Vicente Iranzo	Minister of Navy	Ind.
4 October 1933	Santiago Casares Quiroga	Leader of the Galician Republican Party	PRG
4 October 1933	Juan Castrillo Santos	Leader of the Progressive Republican Parliamentary Group	PRP
4 October 1933	José Franchy y Roca	Leader of the Federal Republican Parliamentary Group	PRDF
4 October 1933	Juan Botella Asensi	Leader of the Radical Socialist Left	IRS
4 October 1933	Rodrigo Soriano	Leader of the dissident federalists	PRDF
4 October 1933	Manuel Azaña	Leader of Republican Action	AR
4 October 1933	Ángel Ossorio y Gallardo	Leader of the Independent Republican Parliamentary Group	Ind.
4 October 1933	Miguel de Unamuno	Member of the Independent Republican Parliamentary Group	Ind.
4 October 1933	Gregorio Marañón (1º time)	Member of the Service to the Republic Parliamentary Group	Ind.
4 October 1933	Felipe Sánchez Román	Member of the Independent Republican Parliamentary Group	Ind.
4 October 1933	Melquíades Álvarez	Leader of the Liberal Democrat Republican Party	PRLD
4 October 1933	Amadeu Hurtado Miró	Member of Catalan Republican Action	ACR
4 October 1933	Santiago Alba	Member of the Independent Republican Parliamentary Group	Ind.
4 October 1933	José Manuel Pedregal	Member of the Liberal Democratic Republican Party	PRLD
4 October 1933	Raimundo de Abadal	Member of the Catalanist League	LC
4 October 1933	José Ortega y Gasset	Leader of the Service to the Republic Parliamentary Group	Ind.
4 October 1933	Claudio Sánchez-Albornoz	Minister of State	AR
4 October 1933	Alejandro Lerroux	Prime minister Leader of the Radical Republican Party	PRR
6 October 1933	Miguel Santaló (2º time)	Minister of Communications Leader of the Catalan Left Group	ERC
6 October 1933	Diego Martínez Barrio	Minister of Governance	PRR
6 October 1933	Gregorio Marañón (2º time)	Member of the Service to the Republic Parliamentary Group	Ind.
7 October 1933	Gregorio Marañón (3º time)	Member of the Service to the Republic Parliamentary Group	Ind.
Result
Outcome →	Nomination of Felipe Sánchez Román (Ind.) (4 Oct). No Declined; Nomination of José Manuel Pedregal (PRLD) (5 Oct) No Declined; Nomination of Gregorio Marañón (Ind.) (6 Oct) No Declined; Nomination of Adolfo González Posada (PRLD) (7 Oct) No Declined; Nomination of Diego Martínez Barrio (PRR) (7 Oct). Accepted		

After the round of consultations, Alcalá-Zamora nominated Sánchez Román, who refused to form a government with catalanist ministers. He then nominated José Manuel Pedregal who refused after facing the opposition of the PRRS and the PRRSI. The next nomination was Gregorio Marañón who rejected outright to form a government but accepted helping the President of the Republic to carry out negotiations to seek an agreement. González Posada was then nominated but refused after failing to create an agreement between the radicals and the socialists. Finally, the fifth nomination, Martínez Barrio, managed to create a coalition and formed a government.

== Cabinet changes ==
- On 29 November 1933, Botella Asensi resigns as Minister of Justice due to infighting within the government, being replaced by Domingo Barnés Salinas.

== Council of Ministers ==
Image	Portfolio	Name	Political Party
	President of the Council of Ministers	Diego Martínez Barrio	Radical Republican Party
	Minister of State	Claudio Sánchez-Albornoz	Republican Action
	Minister of Justice	Juan Botella Asensi	Radical Socialist Left
	Minister of War	Vicente Iranzo Enguita	Independent
	Minister of Navy	Leandro Pita Romero	Galician Republican Party
	Minister of Finance	Antonio Lara Zárate	Radical Republican Party
	Minister of Governance	Manuel Rico Avello	Independent
	Minister of Public Works	Rafael Guerra del Río	Radical Republican Party
	Minister of Public Instruction and Fine Arts	Domingo Barnés Salinas	Radical Socialist Republican Party
	Minister of Labour and Foresight	Carles Pi i Sunyer	Republican Left of Catalonia
	Minister of Industry and Commerce	Félix Gordón Ordás	Radical Socialist Republican Party
	Minister of Communications	Emilio Palomo Aguado	Radical Socialist Republican Party
	Minister of Agriculture	Cirilio del Río Rodríguez	Progressive Republican Party
=== Changes 29 November 1933 ===
Image	Portfolio	Name	Political Party
	Minister of Justice	Domingo Barnés Salinas	Radical Socialist Republican Party
