= Third government of Manuel Azaña =

Government of Spain (1933)

3rd government of Manuel Azaña
- Government of Spain
- 1933
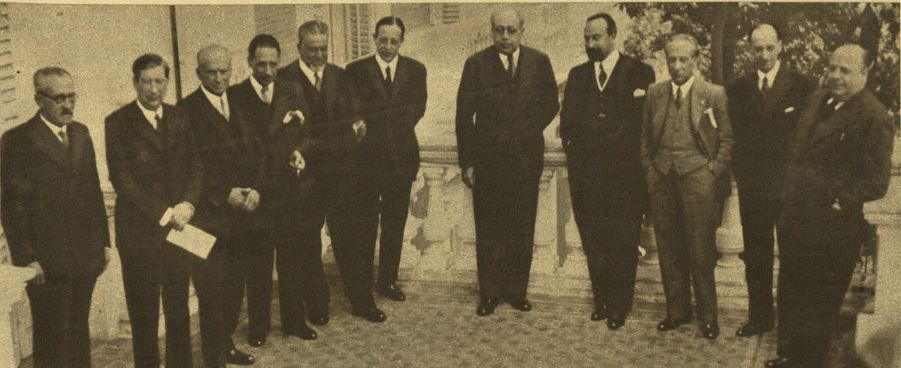
- The government in June 1933
- Date formed: 12 June 1933
- Date dissolved: 12 September 1933

People and organisations
- President: Niceto Alcalá-Zamora
- Prime Minister: Manuel Azaña
- No. of ministers: 11 (Note: Does not include the prime minister.)
- Total no. of members: 12
- Member parties: PSOE; PRRS; ERC; AR; PRG; PRDF
- Status in legislature: Majority (coalition)
- Opposition party: PRR
- Opposition leader: Alejandro Lerroux

History
- Predecessor: Azaña II
- Successor: Lerroux I

The third government of Manuel Azaña was formed on 12 June 1933, following the latter's appointment as prime minister of Spain by President Niceto Alcalá-Zamora and his swearing-in that same day. It succeeded the second Azaña government and was the government of Spain from 12 June 1933 to 12 September 1933, a total of 92 days, or 3 months.

The cabinet comprised members of the Spanish Socialist Workers' Party (PSOE), the Radical Socialist Republican Party (PRRS), Republican Left of Catalonia (ERC), the Republican Action (AR), the Galician Republican Party (PRG) and the Federal Democratic Republican Party (PRDF).

The government would collapse after their loss on the partial local elections of 23 April 1933 and the elections to the Guarantees' Tribunal on 3 September 1933, that were won by the opposition CEDA. In an effort to prevent the fall of his cabinet, Azaña called a motion of confidence in order to prove he still counted with the confidence of the "majority" on 6 September and passed. Nonetheless, on the next day the President of the Republic withdrew his confidence on the government using the election losses and the narrow victory of the motion of confidence as a pretext for this decision.

== Votes of confidence/no confidence ==
Motion of confidence Confidence in the Government (José Giral)
| Ballot → | 6 September 1933 |
| Required majority → | Simple |
| Yes: • PSOE; • AR; • ERC; • PRRS; • ORGA; • PRDF | 147 / 470 |
| No: • Spanish Syndicalist Movement (1); • Radical Socialist Left (1); • INDEP (1) | 3 / 470 |
| Not voting | 321 / 470 |

== Formation ==
=== Overview ===
The Constitution of 1931 enshrined Spain as a semi-presidential republic, awarding the President of the Republic the capability of appointing government ministers at will unless the Cortes refused explicitly, that is to say, through a motion of no confidence. He could also inspect and ultimately control executive acts by granting or denying the signature of presidential decrees and dissolve the Cortes.

=== Round of consultations ===
The President of the Republic, Alcalá-Zamora, held two successive rounds of negotiations to solve the political crisis arising from Azaña's resignation. The first round was held between 8 June and 9 June and the second, on 11 June:

Consultations; President of the Republic
| Date | Consultee | Office/position | Party |
| 8 June 1933 | Julián Besteiro | President of the Cortes Generales | PSOE |
| 8 June 1933 | Remigio Cabello Toral | President of the PSOE; Leader of the Socialist Parliamentary Group | PSOE |
| 8 June 1933 | Alejandro Lerroux (1st time) | Leader of the Radical Republican Party | PRR |
| 8 June 1933 | José Salmerón | Member of the Radical Socialist Republican Party | PRRS |
| 9 June 1933 | Miguel Santaló Pavorell | Leader of the Republican Left Group | ERC |
| 9 June 1933 | Mariano Ruiz-Funes | Member of Republican Action | AR |
| 9 June 1933 | Laureano Gómez Paratcha | Leader of the Galician Parliamentary Group | PRG |
| 9 June 1933 | Miguel Maura | Leader of the Conservative Republican Party | PRC |
| 9 June 1933 | José Franchy y Roca | Leader of the Federal Republican Parliamentary Group | PRDF |
| 9 June 1933 | Vicente Iranzo | Member of the Service to the Republic Parliamentary Group | Ind. |
| 9 June 1933 | Juan Castrillo Santos | Member of the Progressive Republican Party | PRP |
| 9 June 1933 | Juan Botella Asensi | Leader of the Radical Socialist Left | IRS |
| 9 June 1933 | Melquíades Álvarez | Leader of the Liberal Democrat Republican Party | PRLD |
| 9 June 1933 | Ángel Ossorio y Gallardo | Leader of the Independent Republican Group | AAR |
| 9 June 1933 | Santiago Alba | Member of the Independent Republican Parliamentary Group | Ind. |
| 9 June 1933 | Felipe Sánchez-Román | Member of the Independent Republican Parliamentary Group | Ind. |
| 9 June 1933 | Miguel de Unamuno | Member of the Independent Republican Parliamentary Group | Ind. |
| 9 June 1933 | José Ortega y Gasset | Leader of the Service to the Republic Parliamentary Group | Ind. |
| 9 June 1933 | Gregorio Marañón | Member of the Service to the Republic Parliamentary Group | Ind. |
| 9 June 1933 | Amadeu Hurtado Miró | Member of Catalan Republican Action | ACR |
| 11 June 1933 | Álvaro de Albornoz | Minister of Justice | PRRS |
| 11 June 1933 | Marcelino Domingo | Leader of the Radical Socialist Republican Party | PRRS |
| 11 June 1933 | Félix Gordón Ordás | President of the Radical Socialist Republican Party | PRRS |
| 11 June 1933 | Alejandro Lerroux (2nd time) | Leader of the Radical Republican Party | PRR |
Result
| Outcome → | Nomination of Julian Besteiro (PSOE) (9 June). No Declined; Nomination of Indalecio Prieto (PSOE) (10 June) No Declined; Nomination of Marcelino Domingo (PRRS) (11 June) No Declined; Nomination of Manuel Azaña Díaz (AR) (12 June). Accepted | | |

After the round of consultations, it was clear that a new republican-socialist government had to be formed. Alcalá-Zamora tried to form a leftist government presided by someone other than Azaña, with whom he had developed a bad personal relationship over the years. At first he tried for this new government to be presided by the socialists, nominating Julián Besteiro who declined due to "personal reasons" and Indalecio Prieto, who declined after failing to reach a deal with the Radical Republican Party. Then he tried nominating Marcelino Domingo, who declined after failed negotiations with the other parliamentary groups. Having no other option, Azaña was nominated and formed a new government with a larger parliamentary majority than the previous one thanks to the incorporation of the Federal Republicans.

== Cabinet changes ==
- On 12 July 1933, Álvaro de Albornoz resigns as Minister of Justice, being replaced by Santiago Casares Quiroga.

== Council of Ministers ==
| Image | Portfolio | Name | Political Party |
|---|---|---|---|
| | President of the Council of Ministers; Minister of War | Manuel Azaña Díaz | Republican Action |
| | Minister of State | Fernando de los Ríos Urruti | Spanish Socialist Workers' Party |
| | Minister of Justice (until 12 July) | Álvaro de Albornoz Liminiana | Radical Socialist Republican Party |
| | Minister of the Navy | Lluís Companys i Jover | Republican Left of Catalonia |
| | Minister of Finance | Agustín Viñuales Pardo | Independent (Nominated by AR) |
| | Minister of the Governance Minister of Justice (from 12 July) | Santiago Casares Quiroga | Autonomous Galician Republican Organization |
| | Minister of Public Instruction and Fine Arts | Francisco Barnés Salinas | Radical Socialist Republican Party |
| | Minister of Public Works | Indalecio Prieto Tuero | Spanish Socialist Workers' Party |
| | Minister of Labour and Foresight | Francisco Largo Caballero | Spanish Socialist Workers' Party |
| | Minister of Agriculture | Marcelino Domingo Sanjuán | Radical Socialist Republican Party |
| | Minister of Industry and Commerce | José Franchy y Roca | Federal Democratic Republican Party |
Source: "Ahora 13-06-1933".
