= Second government of Manuel Azaña =

Government of Spain (1931–1933)

2nd government of Manuel Azaña
- Government of Spain
- 1931–1933
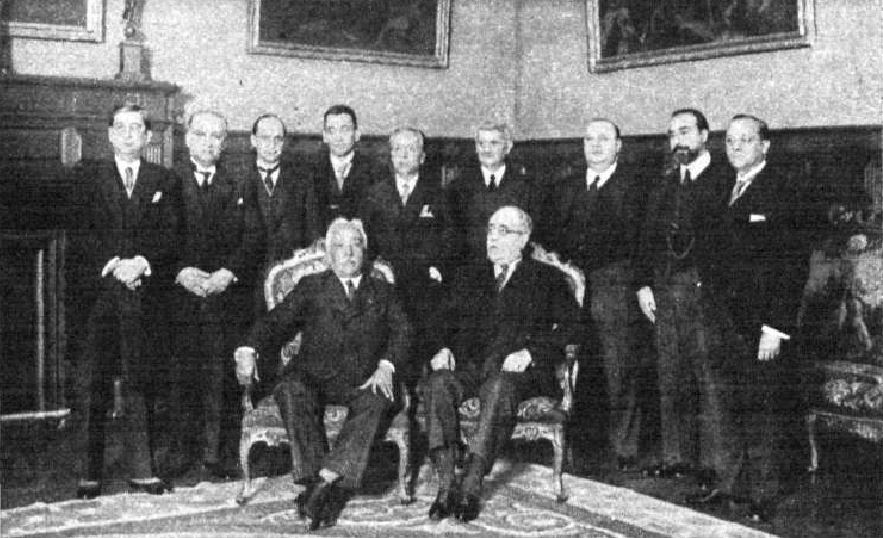
- The government in December 1931
- Date established: 16 December 1931
- Date dissolved: 8 June 1933

Leadership and composition
- President: Niceto Alcalá-Zamora
- Prime Minister: Manuel Azaña
- No. of ministers: 10 (Note: Does not include the prime minister.)
- Total no. of members: 10
- Member parties: PSOE; PRRS; ERC; AR; ORGA/PRG (Note: In May 1932, the Autonomous Galician Republican Organization was rebranded as the Galician Republican Party.)
- Status in legislature: Majority (coalition)
- Opposition party: PRR
- Opposition leader: Alejandro Lerroux

Formation and history
- Predecessor: Provisional
- Successor: Azaña III

The second government of Manuel Azaña was formed on 16 December 1931, following the latter's appointment as prime minister of Spain by President Niceto Alcalá-Zamora and his swearing-in that same day. It succeeded the first Azaña government and was the government of Spain from 16 December 1931 to 12 June 1933, a total of 544 days, or 1 year, 5 months and 27 days.

The cabinet comprised members of the Spanish Socialist Workers' Party (PSOE), the Radical Socialist Republican Party (PRRS), the Republican Action (AR) and the Autonomous Galician Republican Organization (ORGA), as well as one independent minister proposed by Republican Left of Catalonia (ERC). It was disestablished as a consequence of the fallout of the Casas Viejas incident and the withdrawal of presidential confidence due to the approval of the Law on Religious Congregations.

== Formation ==
=== Overview ===
The Constitution of 1931 enshrined Spain as a semi-presidential republic, awarding the President of the Republic the capability of appointing government ministers at will unless the Cortes refused explicitly, that is to say, through a motion of no confidence. He could also inspect and ultimately control executive acts by granting or denying the signature of presidential decrees and dissolve the Cortes.

=== Round of consultations ===
With the approval of the Constitution and the election of the President of the Republic, the provisional government dissolved itself and Alcalá-Zamora started the round of consultations to name a new government.

Consultations; President of the Republic
Date	Consultee	Office/position	Party
14 December 1931	Julian Besteiro Fernández	President of the Cortes Generales	PSOE
14 December 1931	Alejandro Lerroux Gracía	Minister of State; Leader of the Radical Republican Party	PRR
14 December 1931	Remigio Cabello Toral (1st time)	President of the PSOE; Leader of the Socialist Parliamentary Group	PSOE
14 December 1931	Emilio Baeza Medina	Leader of the Radical Socialist Parliamentary Group	PRRS
14 December 1931	Luis Bello Trompeta	Leader of the Republican Action Parliamentary Group	AR
14 December 1931	José Ortega y Gasset	Leader of the Service to the Republic Parliamentary Group	ASR
14 December 1931	Remigio Cabello Toral (2nd time)	President of the PSOE; Leader of the Socialist Parliamentary Group	PSOE
14 December 1931	Carlos Blanco Pérez	Leader of the Progressive Republican Parliamentary Group	PRP
14 December 1931	José Franchy y Roca	Leader of the Federal Republican Parliamentary Group	PRDF
14 December 1931	Lluís Companys	Leader of the Catalan Left Parliamentary Group	ERC
14 December 1931	Santiago Casares Quiroga	Minister of Governance	ORGA
15 December 1931	Manuel Azaña Díaz (1st time)	President of the Council of Ministers	AR
15 December 1931	Manuel Azaña Díaz (2nd time)	President of the Council of Ministers	AR
Result
Outcome →	Nomination of Manuel Azaña Díaz (AR). Accepted		

== Cabinet changes ==
- Casares Quiroga would be acting Minister of Communications until 31 March 1932, when it was integrated into the Ministry of Governance as an undersecretary.

== Council of Ministers ==
Image	Portfolio	Name	Political Party
	President of the Council of Ministers; Minister of War	Manuel Azaña Díaz	Republican Action
	Minister of State	Luis de Zulueta y Escolano	Independent
	Minister of Justice	Álvaro de Albornoz Liminiana	Radical Socialist Republican Party
	Minister of the Navy	José Giral Pereira	Republican Action
	Minister of Finance	Jaime Carner Romeu	Independent (Nominated by ERC)
	Minister of the Governance Minister of Communications	Santiago Casares Quiroga	Autonomous Galician Republican Organization
	Minister of Public Instruction and Fine Arts	Fernando de los Ríos Urruti	Spanish Socialist Workers' Party
	Minister of Public Works	Indalecio Prieto Tuero	Spanish Socialist Workers' Party
	Minister of Labour and Foresight	Francisco Largo Caballero	Spanish Socialist Workers' Party
	Minister of Agriculture, Industry and Commerce	Marcelino Domingo Sanjuán	Radical Socialist Republican Party
Source: "Gaceta de Madrid 8-12-1931" (PDF).
