= Provisional Government of the Second Spanish Republic =

1931 government of Spain

Provisional Government of the Spanish Republic
- Government of Spain
- 1931
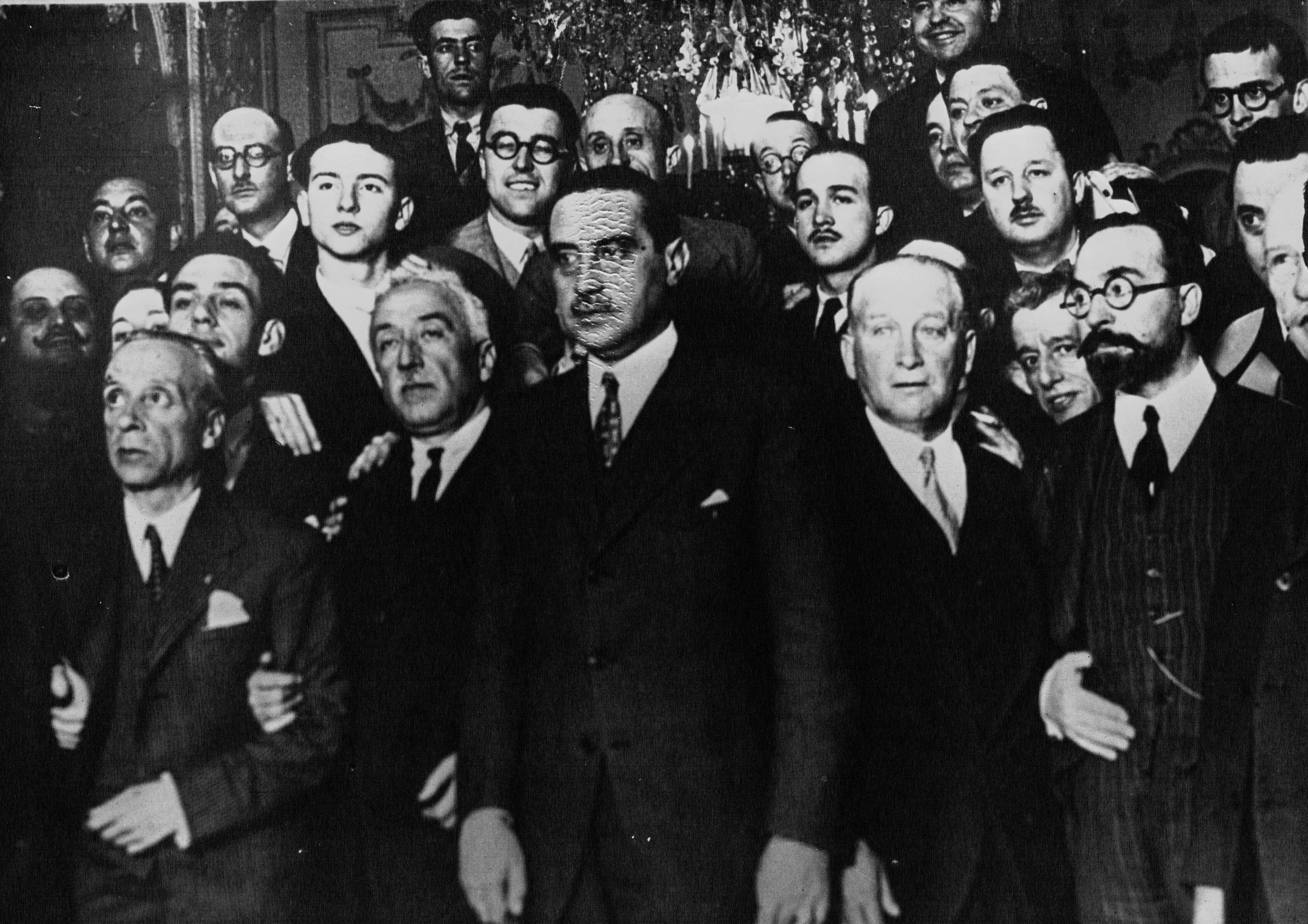
- Provisional Government
- Date formed: 14 April 1931
- Date dissolved: 11 December 1931

People and organisations
- President: Vacant
- Prime Minister: Niceto Alcalá-Zamora (April-Oct 1931); Manuel Azaña (Oct - Dec 1931)
- Total no. of members: 12
- Member parties: Republican Action; Spanish Socialist Workers' Party; Radical Republican Party; Radical Socialist Republican Party; Autonomous Galician Republican Organization; Catalan Republican Action; Liberal Republican Right (until Oct 1931)
- Status in legislature: Majority (multi-party)
- Opposition parties: National Action; Traditionalist Communion; Agrarian Group; Revolutionary Radical Socialist Republican Party; Liberal Democrat Republican Party; Liberal Republican Right (from Oct 1931)
- Opposition leader: José María Gil-Robles y Quiñones

History
- Election: 1931 Spanish general election
- Predecessor: Aznar-Cabañas
- Successor: Azaña II

The Provisional Government of the Second Spanish Republic (Spanish: Gobierno Provisional de la Segunda República Española) was the government that held political power in Spain from the fall of Alfonso XIII of Spain on 14 April 1931 and the proclamation of the Second Spanish Republic until the approval of the Spanish Constitution of 1931 on 9 December and the formation of the first regular government on 15 December. The King's departure created the need for a provisional government, whose first president was Niceto Alcalá Zamora, who presided until 1936, when Manuel Azaña took over. The new constitution established freedom of speech, freedom of association, extended voting privileges to women, allowed divorce, and stripped the Spanish nobility of their special legal status.

== Formation ==
The local elections of 12 April triggered a government crisis due to their loss in the main cities, where the Republican-Socialist Conjunction achieved major victories.

Consultations; King of Spain
Date	Consultee	Office/position	Party
13 April 1931	Council of Ministers	Ministers	Military
13 April 1931	Count of Romanones	Minister of State; Leader of the Liberal Party	Liberal
13 April 1931	José Sánchez-Guerra y Martínez	Member of the Conservative Party	Conservative
13 April 1931	Miguel Villanueva y Gómez	Member of the Liberal Party	Liberal
13 April 1931	Melquíades Álvarez	Leader of the former Reformist Party	Reformist
13 April 1931	Council of Ministers (again)	Ministers	Military
Result
Outcome →	Proclamation of the Second Spanish Republic, power handed over to the Revolutionary Committee.		

Following the recommendations of the Count of Romanones, Alfonso XIII decided to hand power over to the republican-socialist "revolutionary committee". General Sanjurjo informed Miguel Maura of the king's decision. He immediately gathered the "revolutionary committee" and decided to form a government presided by Niceto Alcalá-Zamora

== Cabinet of Alcalá Zamora ==
The cabinet of Alcalá-Zamora lasted until 15 October 1931, when he and Minister of the Interior Miguel Maura resigned due to disagreements over the religious policy carried out by parliament with the approval of Article 26 of the Constitution.

Image	Portfolio	Name	Political Party
	President of the Provisional Government	Niceto Alcalá-Zamora y Torres	Liberal Republican Right
	Minister of State	Alejandro Lerroux García	Radical Republican Party
	Minister of Justice	Fernando de los Ríos Urruti	Spanish Socialist Workers' Party
	Minister of War	Manuel Azaña Díaz	Republican Action Group
	Minister of the Navy	Santiago Casares Quiroga	Autonomous Galician Republican Organization
	Minister of Finance	Indalecio Prieto Tuero	Spanish Socialist Workers' Party
	Minister of the Governance	Miguel Maura Gamazo	Liberal Republican Right
	Minister of Public Instruction and Fine Arts	Marcelino Domingo Sanjuán	Radical Socialist Republican Party
	Minister of Development	Álvaro de Albornoz Liminiana	Radical Socialist Republican Party
	Minister of Labour	Francisco Largo Caballero	Spanish Socialist Workers' Party
	Minister of National Economy	Luis Nicolau d'Olwer	Republican Catalan Action
	Minister of Communications	Diego Martínez Barrio	Radical Republican Party

== Cabinet of Azaña ==
In October 1931, the prime minister Niceto Alcalá-Zamora and the minister of the Governance, Miguel Maura, left the government. Alcalá-Zamora was replaced by the minister of War and Maura was replaced by the minister of the Navy, Santiago Casares Quiroga. To replace Casares as minister of the Navy, Azaña appointed José Giral Pereira.

Image	Portfolio	Name	Political Party
	President of the Council of Ministers; Minister of War	Manuel Azaña Díaz	Republican Action
	Minister of State	Alejandro Lerroux García	Radical Republican Party
	Minister of Justice	Fernando de los Ríos Urruti	Spanish Socialist Workers' Party
	Minister of the Navy	José Giral Pereira	Republican Action
	Minister of Finance	Indalecio Prieto Tuero	Spanish Socialist Workers' Party
	Minister of the Governance	Santiago Casares Quiroga	Autonomous Galician Republican Organization
	Minister of Public Instruction and Fine Arts	Marcelino Domingo Sanjuán	Radical Socialist Republican Party
	Minister of Development	Álvaro de Albornoz Liminiana	Radical Socialist Republican Party
	Minister of Labour	Francisco Largo Caballero	Spanish Socialist Workers' Party
	Minister of National Economy	Luis Nicolau d'Olwer	Republican Catalan Action
	Minister of Communications	Diego Martínez Barrio	Radical Republican Party
