= First government of Alejandro Lerroux =

Government of the Second Spanish Republic

1st government of Alejandro Lerroux
- Government of Spain
- 1933
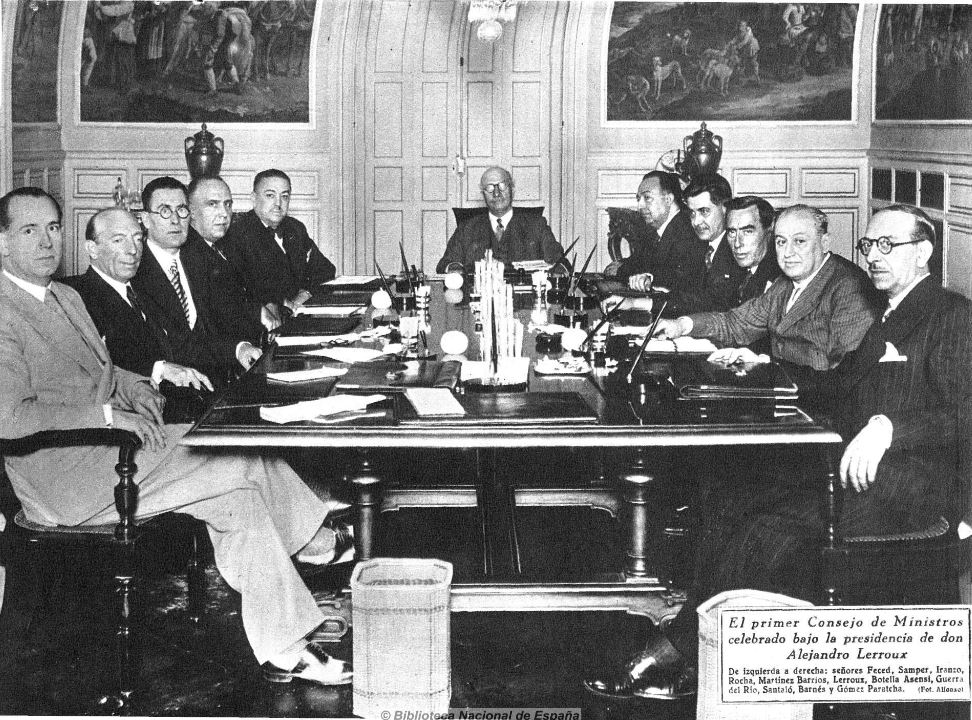
- The government in September 1933
- Date formed: 12 September 1933
- Date dissolved: 8 October 1933

People and organisations
- President: Niceto Alcalá-Zamora
- Prime Minister: Alejandro Lerroux
- No. of ministers: 12 (Note: Does not include the prime minister.)
- Total no. of members: 12
- Member parties: PRR; PRRS; ERC; AR; PRG; IRS
- Status in legislature: Minority (coalition)
- Opposition party: PSOE
- Opposition leader: Indalecio Prieto

History
- Predecessor: Azaña III
- Successor: Martínez Barrio I

The first government of Alejandro Lerroux, also known as the "Government of Republican Concentration", was formed on 12 September 1933, following the latter's appointment as prime minister of Spain by President Niceto Alcalá-Zamora and his swearing-in the same day. It succeeded the third Azaña government and was the government of Spain from 12 September 1933 to 8 October 1933, a total of 26 days.

The cabinet comprised members of the Radical Republican Party (PRR), the Radical Socialist Republican Party (PRRS), Republican Left of Catalonia (ERC), Republican Action (AR), Galician Republican Party (PRG) and Radical Socialist Left (IRS).

The government was plagued by infighting and after Lerroux, when presenting his government to the Cortes on 2 October, suggested he would ask for the dissolution of Congress and the calling of new elections, the coalition broke. The left-wing republicans had made it a condition for participating and supporting the government that the radicals renounce to this demand, their refusal to abide to their conditions led to them supporting a motion of no confidence presented by the socialists which the government lost, leading to its downfall.

== Votes of confidence/no confidence ==
Motion of no confidence Confidence in the Government (Indalecio Prieto)
Ballot →	3 October 1933
Required majority →	Simple
Yes: • PSOE; • AR; • ERC; • PRG; • PRDF; • USC; • Catalan Republican Action; • PCE	187 / 470
No: • PRR; • PRRS; • PRDF; • Association of Service to the Republic Parliamentary Group; • PRP; • Extreme Federal Left; • AR; • Independents	91 / 470
Not voting	192 / 470

== Formation ==
=== Overview ===
The Constitution of 1931 enshrined Spain as a semi-presidential republic, awarding the President of the Republic the capability of appointing government ministers at will unless the Cortes refused explicitly, that is to say, through a motion of no confidence. He could also inspect and ultimately control executive acts by granting or denying the signature of presidential decrees and dissolve the Cortes.

=== Round of consults ===
The President of the Republic, Alcalá-Zamora, held a round of consultations to solve the political crisis arising from Azaña's resignation between 8 June and 9 June 1933:

Consultations; President of the Republic
Date	Consultee	Office/position	Party
8 June 1933	Julián Besteiro	President of the Cortes Generales	PSOE
8 June 1933	Remigio Cabello Toral	Leader of the Socialist Parliamentary Group	PSOE
8 June 1933	Mariano Ruiz-Funes	Leader of the Republican Action Parliamentary Group	AR
8 June 1933	Alejandro Lerroux	Leader of the Radical Republican Party	PRR
8 June 1933	Miguel Maura	Leader of the Conservative Republican Party	PRC
8 June 1933	Laureano Gómez Paratcha	Leader of the Galician Parliamentary Group	PRG
8 June 1933	José Franchy y Roca	Minister of Industry and Commerce; Leader of the Federal Republican Parliamentary Group	PRDF
8 June 1933	Rodrigo Soriano	Leader of the dissident federalists	PRDF
8 June 1933	Vicente Iranzo	Member of the Service to the Republic Parliamentary Group	Ind.
8 June 1933	Juan Castrillo	Leader of the Progressive Republican Parliamentary Group	PRP
8 June 1933	Juan Botella Asensi	Leader of the Radical Socialist Left	IRS
9 June 1933	Ángel Ossorio y Gallardo	Leader of the Independent Republican Parliamentary Group	AAR
9 June 1933	Felipe Sánchez Román	Member of the Independent Republican Parliamentary Group	Ind.
9 June 1933	Amadeu Hurtado Miró	Member of the Left Catalan Parliamentary Group	Ind.
9 June 1933	Melquíades Álvarez	Leader of the Liberal Democrat Republican Party	PRLD
9 June 1933	Miguel de Unamuno	Member of the Independent Republican Parliamentary Group	Ind.
9 June 1933	Santiago Alba	Member of the Independent Republican Parliamentary Group	Ind.
9 June 1933	José Ortega y Gasset	Leader of the Service to the Republic Parliamentary Group	Ind.
9 June 1933	Gregorio Marañón	Member of the Service to the Republic Parliamentary Group	Ind.
9 June 1933	Raimundo de Abadal	Member of the Regionalist League	LR
9 June 1933	Francesc Cambó	Leader of the Regionalist League	LR
9 June 1933	Manuel Azaña	Prime Minister	AR
Result
Outcome →	Nomination of Alejandro Lerroux García (PRR). Accepted		

After being nominated by Alcalá-Zamora to "restore the fraternal understanding among all republican factions", Lerroux would try to form a "government of notables" which would have included Felipe Sánchez Román, José Ortega y Gasset and Salvador de Madariaga but this was called off by the President of the Republic and the left republicans, who associated this practice with the Reign of Alfonso XIII. After the failure of his initial plan, he decided to form a conventional coalition government with the left republicans.

== Council of Ministers ==
Image	Portfolio	Name	Political Party
	President of the Council of Ministers	Alejandro Lerroux García	Radical Republican Party
	Minister of State	Claudio Sánchez-Albornoz y Menduiña	Republican Action
	Minister of Justice	Juan Botella Asensi	Radical Socialist Left
	Minister of War	Juan José Rocha García	Radical Republican Party
	Minister of Navy	Vicente Iranzo Enguita	Independent
	Minister of Finance	Antonio Lara Zárate	Radical Republican Party
	Minister of Governance	Diego Martínez Barrio	Radical Republican Party
	Minister of Public Works	Rafael Guerra del Río	Radical Republican Party
	Minister of Public Instruction and Fine Arts	Domingo Barnés Salinas	Radical Socialist Republican Party
	Minister of Labour and Foresight	Ricardo Samper Ibáñez	Autonomist Republican Union Party
	Minister of Industry and Commerce	Laureano Gómez Paratcha	Galician Republican Party
	Minister of Communications	Miquel Santaló i Parvorell	Republican Left of Catalonia
	Minister of Agriculture	Ramón Feced Gresa	Radical Socialist Republican Party
