= 1933 Spanish general election =

- 19 November 1933

All 473 seats of the Congress of Deputies 237 seats needed for a majority
- Turnout: 67.31%

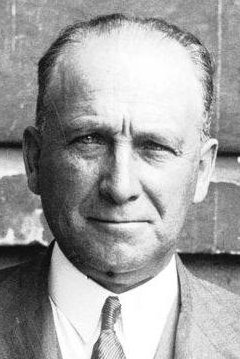

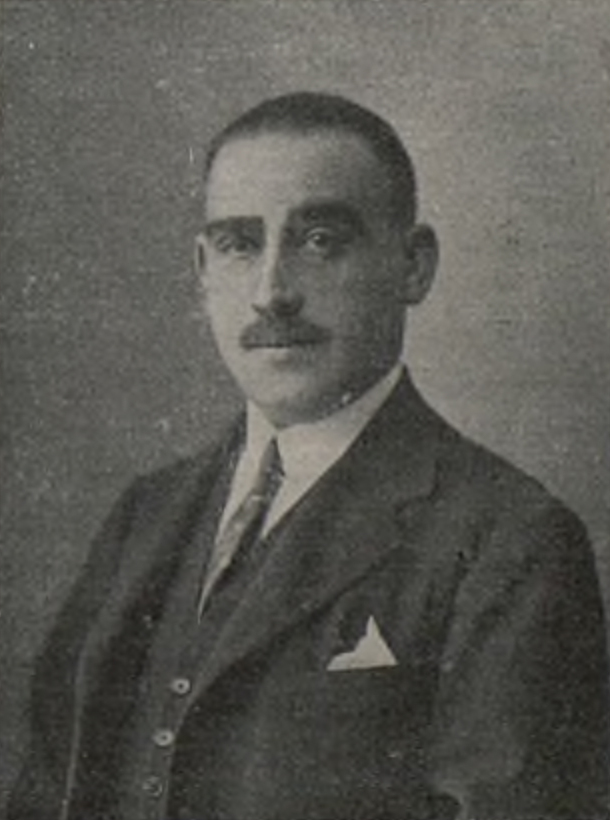

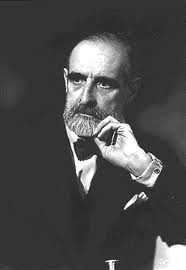

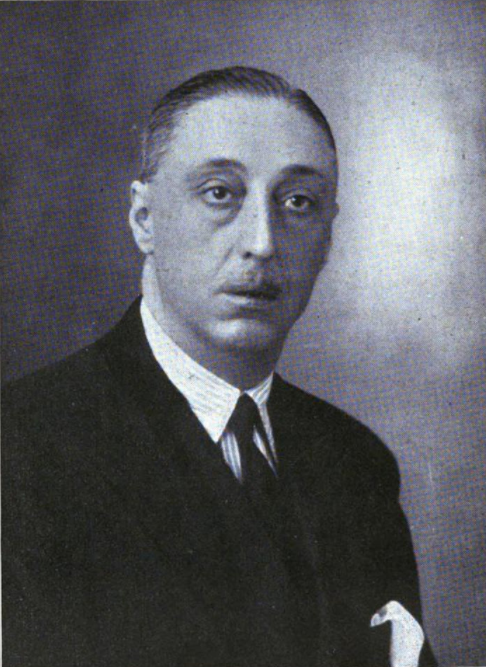
	First party	Second party	Third party
Leader	José María Gil-Robles y Quiñones	Alejandro Lerroux	Francisco Largo Caballero
Party	CEDA	PRR	PSOE
Leader since	4 March 1933	1908	1932
Leader's seat	Salamanca	Valencia-capital	Madrid-capital
Last election	5 seats (Note: Compared to Popular Action results in 1931, which became part of the CEDA in 1932)	90 seats	115 seats
Seats won	115	102	59
Seat change	▲110	▲12	▼56
	Fourth party	Fifth party	Sixth party
Leader	José Martínez de Velasco	Francesc Cambó	The Count of Rodezno
Party	Agrarian minority	LRC	Traditionalist
Leader since	1934	1918	1931
Leader's seat	Burgos	Barcelona-capital	Navarre
Last election	15 seats	2 seats	4 seats
Seats won	30	24	20
Seat change	▲15	▲22	▲16
- Election results map
Prime Minister before election
Diego Martínez Barrio
PRR
Prime Minister after election
Alejandro Lerroux
PRR

Elections to Spain's legislature, the Cortes Generales, were held on 19 November 1933 for all 473 seats in the unicameral Cortes of the Second Spanish Republic. Since the previous elections of 1931, a new constitution had been ratified, and the franchise extended to more than six million women. The governing Republican-Socialist coalition had fallen apart, with the Radical Republican Party beginning to support a newly united political right.

The right formed an electoral coalition, as was favoured by the new electoral system enacted earlier in the year. The Spanish Socialist Workers' Party (Partido Socialista Obrero Español, or PSOE) won only 59 seats. The newly formed Catholic conservative Spanish Confederation of the Autonomous Right (Confederación Española de Derechas Autónomas or CEDA) gained 115 seats and the Radicals 102. The right capitalised on disenchantment with the government among Catholics and other conservatives. CEDA campaigned on reversing the reforms that had been made under the Republic, and on freeing political prisoners. Anarchists favoured abstention from the vote. These factors helped the election to result in significant victory for the right over the left.

== Background ==
Elections in June 1931 had returned a large majority of Republicans and Socialists to the Cortes, with the PSOE gaining 116 seats and the Radical Republican Party 94. The state's financial position was poor. Wealth redistribution supported by the new government attracted criticism from the wealthy. The government also attempted to tackle poverty in rural areas by instituting an eight-hour day and giving security of tenure to farm workers, drawing criticism from landlords.

An effective parliamentary opposition was led by three groups. The first included Catholic movements such as the Catholic Association of Propagandists (Asociación Católica de Propagandistas). (Note: See also: es:Asociación Católica de Propagandistas (in Spanish)) The second group consisted of organisations that had supported the monarchy, such as the Renovación Española and Carlists, who wanted to see the new republic overthrown in a violent uprising. The third group were fascist organisations. Members of the National Confederation of Labour (Confederación Nacional del Trabajo, or CNT) trade union movement willing to cooperate with the Republic were forced out of the CNT, which continued to oppose the government. Opposition parties had the support of the church. A new constitution was ratified on 9 December 1931. It included many controversial articles, some of which were aimed at curbing the influence of the Catholic Church. The constitution was reformist, liberal, and democratic in nature, and was welcomed by the Republican-Socialist coalition, but opposed by landowners, industrialists, the organised church, and army officers. In opposing educational and religious reforms, Spanish Catholics were forced to oppose the government. The press criticised government actions as barbaric, unjust, and corrupt.

In October 1931 Prime Minister Niceto Alcalá Zamora resigned and was succeeded by Manuel Azaña. Radical Party leader Alejandro Lerroux had wanted that job himself and became alienated, switching his party's support to the opposition. This left Azaña dependent on the Socialists, but both the Socialists, who favoured reform, and the conservative right, who were against reform, were critical of the government. Socialists continued to support Azaña, but the left became fractured, driving the Socialists to the left, while the right united into CEDA, which tacitly embraced fascism.

On 1 October 1933, Socialist left leader Largo Caballero spoke out against Lerroux's Republicans, suggesting the reform programme of the government, and thus the basis for the Republic itself, was under threat. He warned that if the government itself were the threat, the Socialists would have to withdraw support for it. The following day another Socialist leader, Indalecio Prieto, declared that the Socialists would no longer participate in government, which precipitated its collapse. Alcalá Zamora, who became president in 1931, now requested that Republican Martínez Barrio form a new government. Socialist opposition on both constitutional and ideological grounds meant the PSOE withheld its support for the Barrio government, which was formed on 8 October, but called for fresh elections to be held on 19 November 1933.

== Election ==
Nobody should vote, because politics means immorality, shameful business practices, growing fat, excessive ambition, uncontrolled hunger to become rich, to dominate, to impose oneself, to possess the privileges of State, both in the name of democracy and in the name of God, the Fatherland and the King.

— From an anarchist newspaper in October 1933.

In common with the 1936 election, Spain was divided into multi-member constituencies; for example, Madrid had 17 representatives. However, each member of the electorate could vote for somewhat less than that – in Madrid's case, 13. This favoured coalitions, as in Madrid when the Socialists won 13 members and the right, with only 5,000 votes less, secured only the remaining 4. This system had been passed in 1933. There would be two rounds of voting; 40% of the vote was necessary in the first round to win. In the event that no list of candidates reached 40%, then a second round would be composed of those achieving at least 8% in the first round. It was the first election in Spain where women had the vote, following the new constitution. This incorporated a new 6,800,000 electors. The elections were held under Republican electoral law, which would guarantee a certain percentage of seats in a district to a plurality of votes no matter how weak the plurality. This law was amended in July 1933 to make it even more disproportionate (winning a plurality guaranteed 67% of seats and winning a majority guaranteed 80% of seats). This meant it strongly favoured coalitions and it had been passed by the Azaña government in the hopes it would secure electoral victory for the Spanish left.

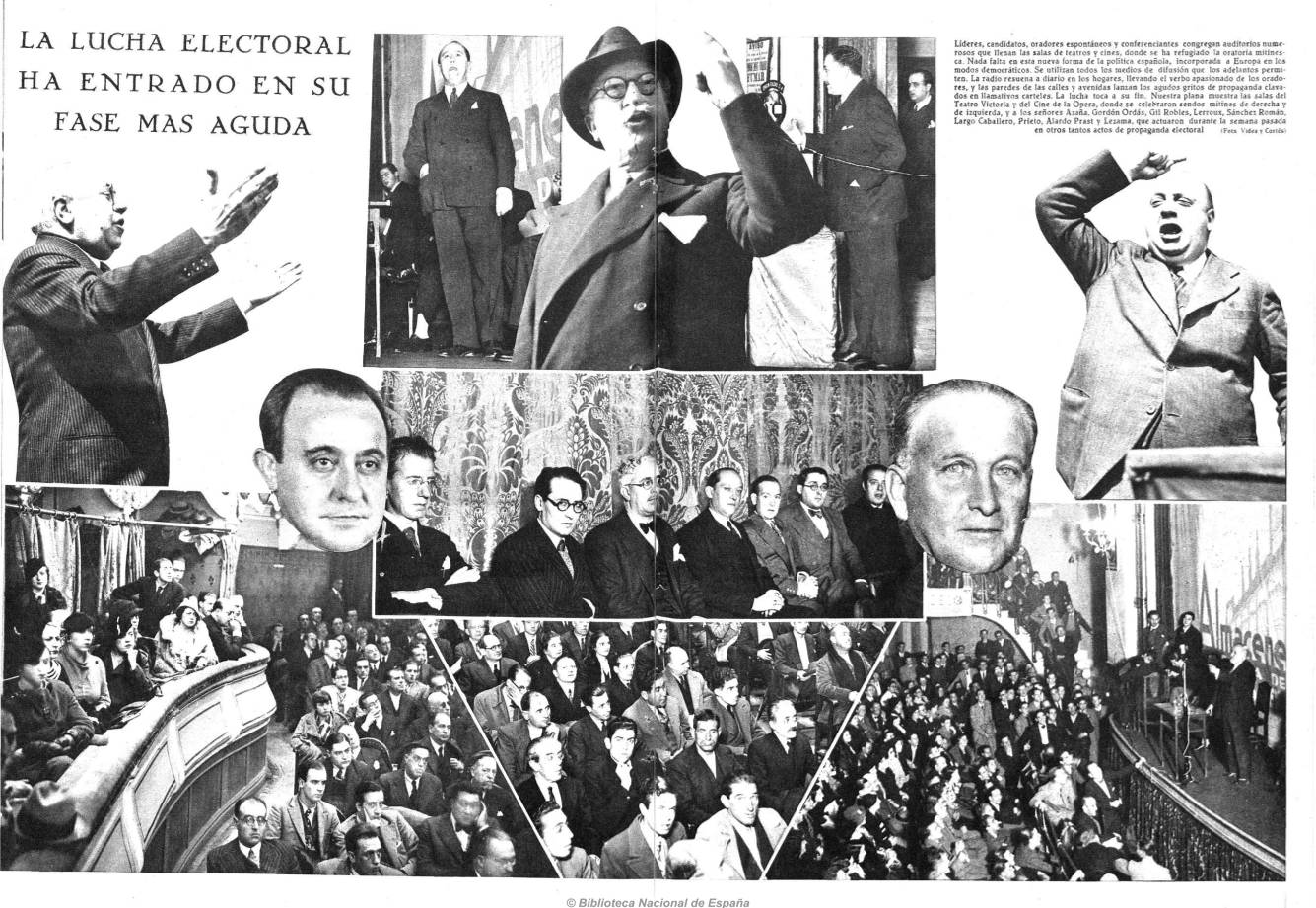
Images of the electoral campaign of the 1933 Spanish general election.

The governing leftist parties went to the polls divided. The political right, on the other hand, formed the Union of the Right (Spanish: Unión de Derechas) which incorporated CEDA, agrarian parties and traditionalists. It stood on a three-point programme: religious and social reforms would be examined and rolled back where needed; agrarian reform would be reversed; political prisoners would be released. These parties threw vast resources into their campaign, with ten million leaflets, 300,000 posters, radio and cinema addresses and aerial propaganda drops. They called upon Catholics to defend order and religion against the bourgeois Republic. The Radical Party campaigned primarily against the Socialists, since they would need the help of the political right if in government. They used mass-appeal slogans such as 'Republic, order, freedom, social justice, amnesty' and were confident following successes at municipal level in 1933. Anarchists such as the CNT-FAI called for abstention: politicians were 'vultures', who must be overthrown by revolution. If the right were to win the election, there would be an uprising, they promised. Thus, anarchists should avoid voting for the left, since overthrowing the government would be preferable. Abstention was supported by Benito Pabón and Miguel Abós.

Elections were held on 19 November 1933. A second round of voting was held in sixteen constituencies on 3 December. The campaign and elections were not without violence; thirty-four people were killed and far more injured, primarily by the political left but also by the political right.

== Outcome ==
It resulted in an overwhelming victory for the right, with the CEDA and the Radicals together winning 219 seats. (Note: Thomas (1961). p. 66. allocates 207 seats to the political right.) Although the political situation was complicated, parties of the right won around 3,365,700 votes, parties of the centre 2,051,500 votes, and parties of the left 3,118,000 according to one estimate. Turnout was around 8,535,200 votes, 67.5% of the electorate. The right had spent far more on their election campaign than the Socialists, who campaigned alone. Women, in their first election, mainly voted for the centre-right. Julián Casanova observes that while some republicans and socialists had argued in 1931 against women's suffrage on the grounds it would deliver votes to the right, the right's 1933 victory was the result of a general political rightward shift, rather than because of the female vote. The Communist Party, with perhaps 3,000 members, were at this point not significant. Nationalist Basques won twelve of seventeen Basque seats, a considerable victory. Keeping their promise, the CNT proclaimed a revolution. There were many reasons the Socialists and Republicans lost out; the female vote alone cannot explain the shift. Among them was the disunity of the political left compared to the right, in a system that favoured broad coalitions. The Radicals and their supporters had also shifted to the right. Abstentionalism hindered Socialist and Republican candidates. Overall, the political system in Spain had changed dramatically since the last election. The failure of the Spanish left was also partially attributable to the 1933 electoral law. The second Azaña government had amended the law to give disproportionate seats to pluralities and majorities, which ended up favouring broad coalitions. However, the refusal for the Socialists to collaborate with the left Republicans made such a left-wing alliance impossible, while the Spanish right had managed to form its own coalition.

The Renovación Española and the Spanish Nationalist Party (Spanish: Partido Nacionalista Español, PNE) formed the National Block (Spanish: Bloque Nacional), with a total of 14 deputies. Similarly, the Republican Left of Catalonia (Catalan: Esquerra Republicana de Catalunya, ERC), the Socialist Union of Catalonia (Unió Socialista de Catalunya, USC) and the Union of Rabassaires (Unió de Rabassaires, UdR) formed the Catalan Left (Esquerra Catalana) with 18 deputies. Five independents joined the Agrarians and one joined CEDA. The other seven, along with one member of Conservative Republican Party (Spanish: Partido Republicano Conservador, PRC), formed a group of independents called the Independent Right (Independiente de Derechas). The Mallorcan Regionalist deputy joined the Catalan League (Lliga Catalana), and the independent in favour of the Estella Statute joined the Basque Nationalist Party (Partido Nacionalista Vasco). 5 members of the Agrarians and one of the PRC joined CEDA, although the Agrarians as a whole resisted pressure to join CEDA, and formed the Spanish Agrarian Party (Partido Agrario Español).

The left Republicans and Socialists attempted to pressure Niceto Alcalá Zamora, the president of the Republic, into cancelling the election results. They did not contest the ballot results but simply rejected the center-right's victory; they argued the Republic was a leftist project and so only leftist parties should be allowed to govern. CEDA insisted it rejected violence and would follow the rules of the republic; Payne notes that while it had lost six members during the campaign to violence from the left, CEDA had not retaliated in kind. However, Payne also observed that CEDA had insisted on making constitutional changes to the republic that would make it much more conservative and Catholic in nature, which the political left equated to fascism.

The president of the Republic, Niceto Alcalá Zamora entrusted the formation of a cabinet to Alejandro Lerroux, who was reliant on the support of CEDA. This was because Zamora was concerned that CEDA had authoritarian tendencies and thus instead proposed a centrist government under Lerroux that would rely on CEDA's support, which Gil Robles accepted. The CNT responded with an insurrection attempt in December, in which almost one hundred people would die and over another hundred injured, though the deaths were confined to combatants. Two large bombs were detonated in Barcelona on 1 December while on 8 December, explosions and violence broke out in eight cities. Most fighting took place in Zaragoza and Barcelona but also occurred elsewhere, as did indiscriminate acts of terrorism; trains were derailed and in Valencia, a bridge was destroyed causing a wreckage. In the town of Villaneuva de la Serena, an army sergeant in charge of the local recruitment post mutinied, along with several soldiers and fifteen civilian anarchists. The mutiny was crushed the next day with seven of its members, including the sergeant, being killed. The CNT-FAI also took control of several small towns, declaring the establishment of libertarian communism, burning records and abolishing money. However, by 12 December the authorities had mostly regained control.

== Results ==
Summary of the 19 November 1933 Congress of Deputies election results
Electoral alliance	Votes	%	Seats
Union of the Right (CEDA, Agrarians, CT, PRC, RE, Falange, PRLD, PRCe, PRM)	2,327,200	27.16	138
Spanish Agrarian Party	152,400	1.78	6
Liberal Democrat Republican Party–CEDA	124,500	1.45	13
Traditionalist Communion	53,700	0.63	3
Total Union of the Right:	2,657,800	31.02	160
Spanish Socialist Workers' Party	1,858,300	21.68	63
Radical Republican Party	1,208,700	14.10	70
Conservative Republican Party	92,700	1.08	5
Progressive Republican Party	7,400	0.08	0
Total PRR and Centre:	1,308,800	15.26	75
Union of the Right–Radical Republican Party	817,300	9.54	98
Catalan Left (USC, ERC, UdR)	433,600	5.06	26
Catalan League	413,700	4.83	28
Basque Nationalist Party	183,000	2.14	11
Coalition of the Republican Left (AR, PRRSI)	214,100	2.49	1
Communist Party of Spain	154,100	1.80	1
Galician Republican Party (OGRA, PG)	114,600	1.39	8
Galicianist Party	25,000	0.29	0
Total Galician Republican Party:	139,600	1.69	8
Radical Socialist Republican Party	105,500	1.23	1
Catalan Action–Left Republican Nationalist Party	74,200	0.87	0
Federal Democratic Republican Party	34,200	0.40	0
Workers and Peasants' Bloc	18,600	0.22	0
Rural Action	10,600	0.12	0
Iberian Revolutionaries	6,500	0.07	0
Radical Socialist Left	1,400	0.02	0
Independent Republicans	144,600	1.69	1
Totals:	8,575,900	100.00%	473

=== Seats ===
Party divisions at the start of the Cortes, after seats had been awarded between coalitions:

Affiliation	Party	Name in Spanish or Catalan	Abbreviation	Seats
Marxist Left
Marxist Left	Spanish Socialist Workers' Party	Partido Socialista Obrero Español	PSOE	59
Marxist Left	Socialist Union of Catalonia	Unió Socialista de Catalunya	USC	3
Marxist Left	Communist Party of Spain	Partido Comunista de España	PCE	1
Republican Left
Republican Left	Republican Action	Acción Republicana	AR	5
Republican Left	Democratic Federal Republican Party	Partido Republicano Democrático Federal	PRD Fed.	4
Republican Left	Independent Radical Socialist Republican Party	Partido Republicano Radical Socialista Independiente	PRSSI	3
Republican Left	Radical Socialist Republican Party	Partido Republicano Radical Socialista	PRRS	1
Nationalist Left
Nationalist Left	Republican Left of Catalonia	Esquerra Republicana de Catalunya	ERC	17
Nationalist Left	Galician Republican Party	Partido Republicano Gallego	PRG	6
Nationalist Left	Union of Rabassaires	Unió de Rabassaires	UdR	1
Republicans of the centre and of the Right
Republicans of the centre and of the Right	Radical Republican Party	Partido Republicano Radical	PRR	102
Republicans of the centre and of the Right	Conservative Republican Party	Partido Republicano Conservador	PRC	17
Republicans of the centre and of the Right	Liberal Democrat Republican Party	Partido Republicano Liberal Demócrata	PRLD	9
Republicans of the centre and of the Right	Progressive Republican Party	Partido Republicano Progresista	PRP	3
Republicans of the centre and of the Right	Centre Republican Party	Partido Republicano de Centro	PRCe	2
Republicans of the centre and of the Right	Independents of the Centre			5
Regionalists and Nationalists of the centre and of the Right
Regionalists and Nationalists of the centre and of the Right	Catalan League	Lliga Catalana	LC	24
Regionalists and Nationalists of the centre and of the Right	Basque Nationalist Party	Partido Nacionalista Vasco	PNV	11
Regionalists and Nationalists of the centre and of the Right	Mallorcan Regionalist Party	Partit Regionalista de Mallorca	PRM	1
Regionalists and Nationalists of the centre and of the Right	Independents (pro-Statute of Estella)			1
Parties of the Right
Parties of the Right	Spanish Confederation of the Autonomous Right	Confederación Española de Derechas Autónomas	CEDA	115
Parties of the Right	Spanish Agrarian Party	Agrarios (Minoría Agraria)	A	30
Parties of the Right	Independents of the Right			13
Monarchist parties of the Right
Monarchist parties of the Right	Traditionalist Communion	Comunión Tradicionalista (Carlista)	CTC	20
Monarchist parties of the Right	"Spanish Renewal"	Renovación Española	RE	14
Monarchist parties of the Right	Independent Monarchists			4
Monarchist parties of the Right	Spanish Nationalist Party	Partido Nacionalista Español	PNE	1
Fascist parties
Fascist parties	Spanish Falange	Falange Española	FE	1
Total:				473

=== After reorganisation ===
This left the following divisions in the Cortes:

Party	Name in Spanish or Catalan	Abbreviation	Seats
Spanish Socialist Workers' Party	Partido Socialista Obrero Español	PSOE	59
Communist Party of Spain	Partido Comunista de España	PCE	1
Republican Left	Izquierda Republicana	IR	14
Democratic Federal Republican Party	Partido Republicano Democrático Federal	PRD Fed.	4
Radical Socialist Republican Party	Partido Republicano Radical Socialista	PRRS	1
Catalan Left	Esquerra Catalana	EC	21
Radical Republican Party	Partido Republicano Radical	PRR	102
Conservative Republican Party	Partido Republicano Conservador	PRC	15
Liberal Democrat Republican Party	Partido Republicano Liberal Demócrata	PRLD	9
Independent Republicans	Republicano Independiente	RI	10
Catalan League	Lliga Catalana	LC	21
Basque Nationalist Party	Partido Nacionalista Vasco	PNV	12
Spanish Confederation of the Autonomous Right	Confederación Española de Derechas Autónomas	CEDA	120
Spanish Agrarian Party	Agrarios (Minoría Agraria)	A	31
Independents of the Right			13
Traditionalist Communion	Comunión Tradicionalista (Carlista)	CTC	20
National Block	Bloque Nacional	RE	15
Independent Monarchists			4
Spanish Falange	Falange Española	FE	1
Total:			473

== See also ==
- Second biennium of the Second Spanish Republic
