= Cigarral =

Type of building in Toledo, Spain

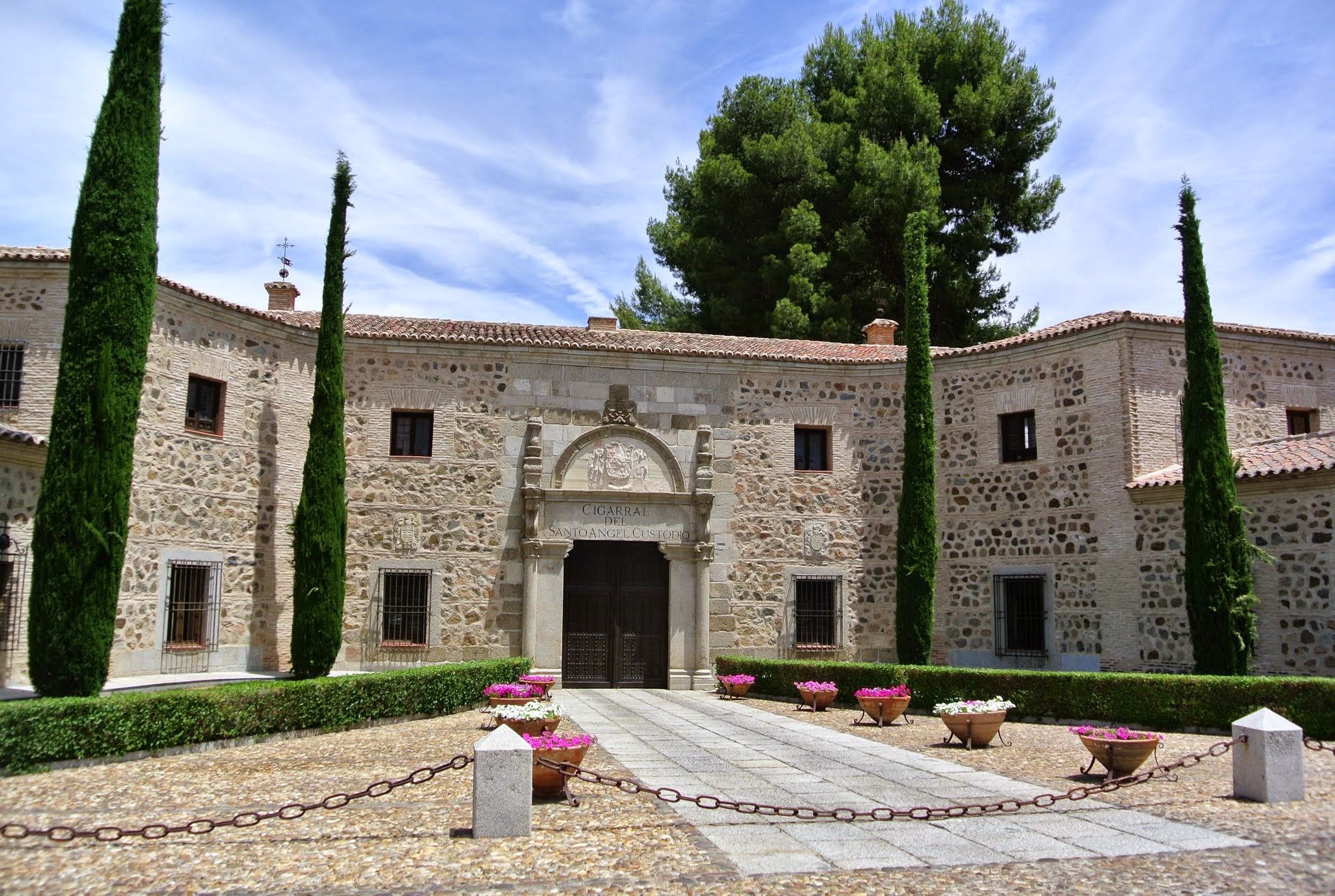
Cigarral del Santo Ángel Custodio

A cigarral refers to a recreational estate or mansion on the south bank of the Tagus river as it passes by the city of Toledo, Spain, with a main building intended for recreational housing, a secondary building for the groundskeepers (cigarraleros) and, most importantly and characteristically, large grounds of at least 7000 m^{2} in area. Until the mid-20th century grounds of approximately 20,000 m^{2} were common.

== Etymology ==
The origin of the word cigarral is unknown. The most commonly believed etymology is that it comes from the seasonal presence of cicadas (Spanish: cigarras) in the summer months, when these residences were primarily occupied. Other proposed etymologies relate it to the conjunction of two Arabic words that refer to recreational houses.

== History ==
Cigarrales are believed to have originated in the middle of the 15th century. Once conflict between the Arab and Christian kingdoms subsided, important church leaders began to buy land on the Tagus river's southern shore, and spend the summer on these farms. By the middle of the 17th century, the lands of the cigarrales were devoted to fruit trees.

Their use as second residences for the Toledan bourgeoisie continued until the mid-20th century, when they began to be subdivided into smaller properties, as the large estates were not profitable and the maintenance costs were high.

In 1994, the PECHT (Plan Especial del Casco Histórico, Special Plan of the Historic District), the urban planning regulations of the Toledo and the Tagus area, came into force. Due to the PECHT, it became more difficult to subdivide large cigarrales, which resulted in a shift away from the zone's previous residential character, as hotels and restaurants began to take over the cigarrales.

In 2006, in the face of the great deterioration of the cigarrales area due to the transformation of use, the first advance of the Special Cigarrales Plan was presented, a document proposed by PECHT to organize the urbanization of the cigarrales.

== Cigarrales in literature ==
One of the chapters of Don Quixote by Miguel de Cervantes takes place in the cigarrales area, as the protagonist passes through Toledo.

Spanish dramatist Tirso de Molina's first published work, in 1621, was titled Los Cigarrales de Toledo.

Galdós, a great lover of Toledo and the cigarrales, showed them to his friend Gregorio Marañón.
