= 1931 general election =

1931 general election may refer to:

- 1931 New Zealand general election
- 1931 Spanish general election
- 1931 United Kingdom general election
