= Marcelino Domingo =

Spanish teacher, journalist and politician

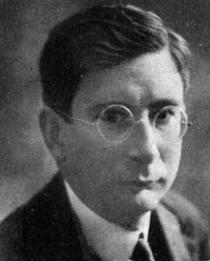
- Marcelino Domingo (1930)

Personal details
- Born: 26 April 1884 Tortosa, Spain
- Died: 2 March 1939 (aged 54) Toulouse, France
- Party: Catalan Republican Party; Radical Socialist Republican Party
- Other political affiliations: Republican Left
- Occupation: Politician, journalist, teacher

Marcelino Domingo Sanjuán (26 April 1884 – 2 March 1939) was a Spanish teacher, journalist, and politician who served as a minister several times during the government of the Second Spanish Republic.

== Biography ==
=== Early life and political career ===
Born in Tarragona, he obtained the title of a teacher in the city in 1903. In the same year, he moved to Tortosa, where he began to teach and came into contact with republican cliques. In Tortosa, he directed republican newspaper El Pueblo.

His political career began in 1909 when he was elected a republican councillor for the Tortosa City Council. His influence in Republican groups was consolidated when he joined the General Council of the Republican Nationalist Federal Union (UFNR) and his subsequent election as a deputy in Cortes in the 1914 elections. However, he would leave the UFNR as a result of the failure of the electoral alliance with the radicals of Alejandro Lerroux in the 1914 elections.

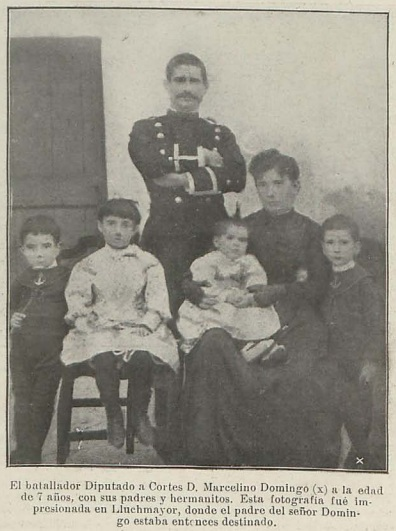
Photograph taken in Lluchmayor of Marcelino Domingo (right) at age 7 with his parents and siblings

Domingo was linked to CNT. During his journalism career, he came to direct the Barcelona newspaper La Lucha, and was editor of the newspaper La Publicidad. During the Spanish crisis of 1917, he would publish a famous article in La Lucha, "¿Qué espera el Rey?", in which he harshly criticized the monarchy.

His political activity increased during the Restoration and the dictatorship of Primo de Rivera. In 1915, he participated in the creation of the Autonomist Republican Bloc, an organization that failed, and two years later he would be one of the founders of the Catalan Republican Party. He was one of the main figures of the Assembly of Parliamentarians and of the preparation of the 1917 Spanish general strike led by PSOE and UGT, among others. Domingo was the main advocate of the autonomy proposal for Catalonia, rejected by the monarchical Cortes in 1918; he also promoted the ephemeral republican platform Left Alliance, which would include PSOE and various republican groups.

In 1928, he published his essay Libertad y Autoridad in the Javier Morata Pedreño Vanguard Library collection in Madrid. In 1930, this publishing house also published his work ¿Qué espera el Rey?.

=== Second Republic ===
In July 1929, together with Álvaro de Albornoz, Marcelino Domingo founded the Radical Socialist Republican Party, an organization from which he participated in 1934, together with Manuel Azaña from Republican Action and Santiago Casares Quiroga from Autonomous Galician Republican Organization, to form Izquierda Republicana.

Considered by Antonio Checa Godoy as the "inspirer" of the publication Diario de Tarragona, the publication would come to support the electoral candidacies headed by Marcelino Domingo on several occasions. He was elected deputy for Barcelona district in the 1931 general elections. In the 1933 elections, however, he failed to recover his seat. He would once again become deputy for Barcelona in the 1936 elections.

Marcelino Domingo was Minister of Public Instruction during the First Biennium of the Republic, between April and December 1931. During his time as minister, he took significant measures such as restricting religious education, authorizing bilingualism in schools in Catalonia, and creating a program for the construction of new schools. After his dismissal from office, he would be replaced by Fernando de los Ríos. Domingo would serve as Minister of Agriculture between December 1931 and June 1933, and again between June and September 1933. He would return to Public Instruction during the first government of the Popular Front, between February and May 1936.

He died in a hotel in Toulouse on March 2, 1939, after having gone into exile.

== Sources ==
- Cruz, José Ignacio (1993). Masonería y educación en la II República Española. Instituto de Cultura «Juan Gil-Albert».
- Ribas, Pedro (2002). Unamuno y Europa. Nuevos ensayos y viejos textos. Cuaderno Gris.
- Urquijo y Goitia, José Ramón de (2008). Gobiernos y ministros españoles en la edad contemporánea. Editorial CSIC - CSIC Press. ISBN 978-84-00-08737-1.
