= Remigio Cabello =

Spanish typesetter and politician

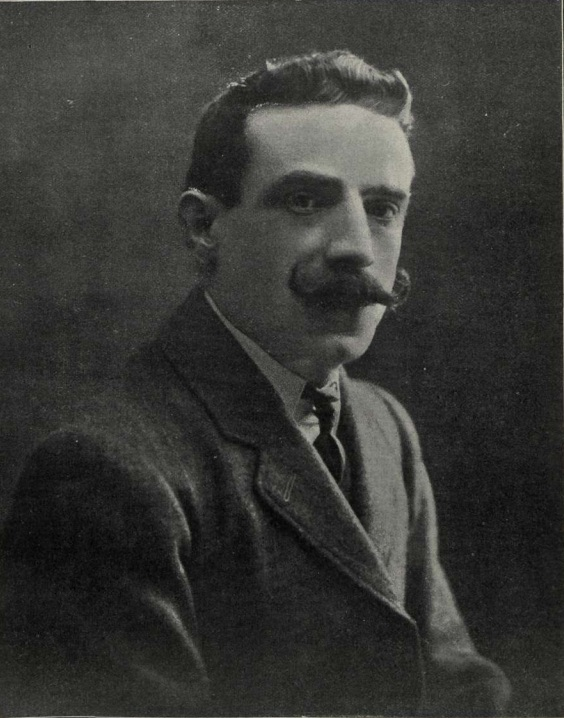
- Portrait circa 1911

President of the Spanish Socialist Workers' Party
- In office 1931–1932
- Preceded by: Julián Besteiro
- Succeeded by: Francisco Largo Caballero

Member of the Congress of Deputies
- In office 1931–1933
- Constituency: Valladolid

Personal details
- Born: 1869 Valladolid, Spain
- Died: 16 May 1936 (aged 66–67) Madrid, Spain
- Party: PSOE

Remigio Cabello Toral (1869–1936) was a Spanish typesetter and politician, member of the Spanish Socialist Workers' Party (PSOE).

== Biography ==
Born in Valladolid in 1869, Cabello was one of the founders of the Valladolid's Socialist Grouping back in 1894. He earned a seat as Valladolid municipal councillor in 1911. He became the chairman of the PSOE in 1931, following the renunciation of Julián Besteiro. He was replaced at the helm of the party by Francisco Largo Caballero, subsequently becoming deputy chairman. He was elected as member of the Republican Cortes at the 1931 general election in representation of Valladolid, commanding 30,718 votes. He died in Madrid on 16 May 1936.
