= José Giral =

Spanish politician

The Most Excellent José Giral OIC
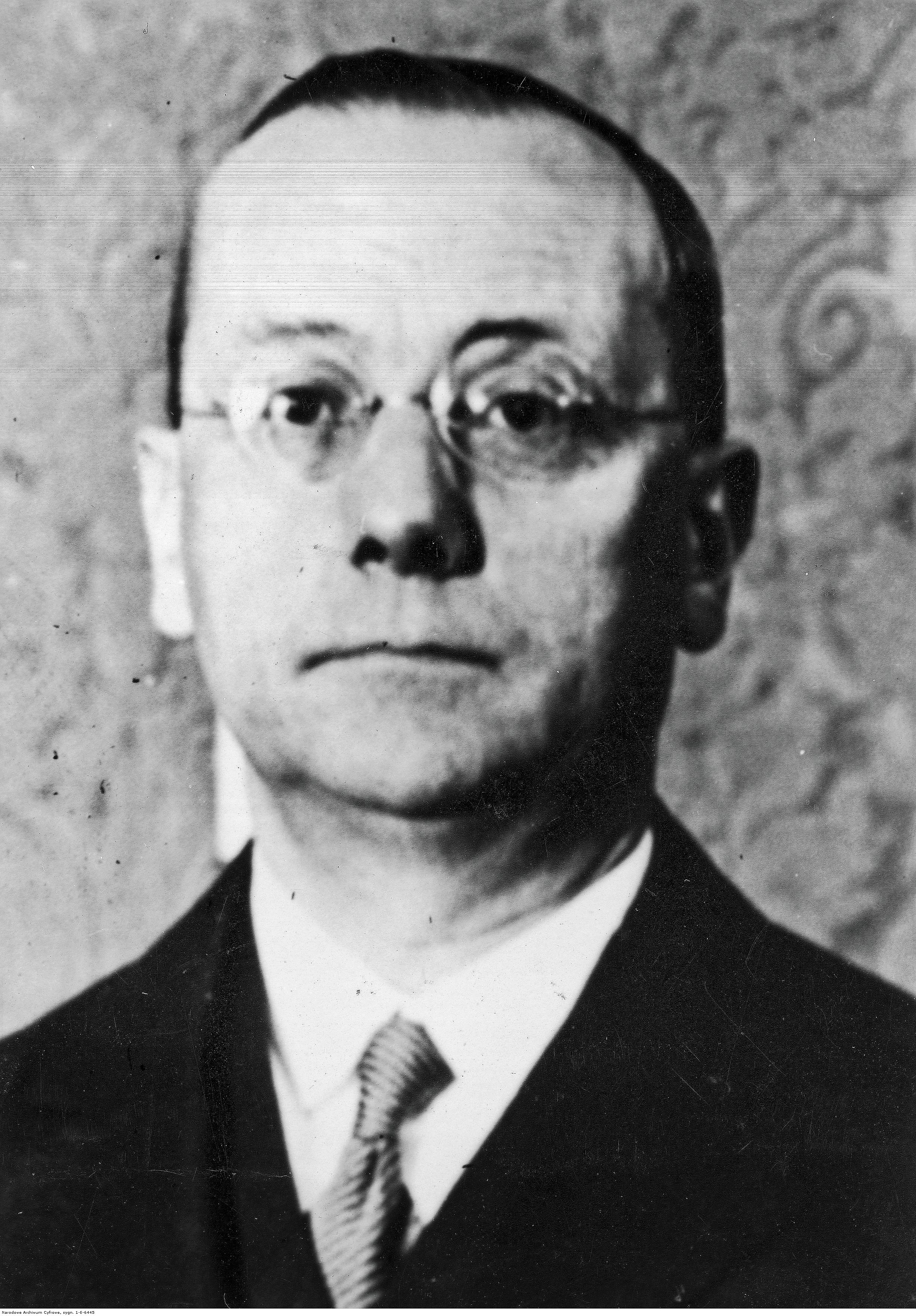

Prime Minister of Spain
- In office 19 July 1936 – 4 September 1936
- President: Manuel Azaña
- Preceded by: Diego Martínez Barrio
- Succeeded by: Francisco Largo Caballero

Minister of State
- In office 17 May 1937 – 5 April 1938
- Prime Minister: Juan Negrín
- Preceded by: Julio Álvarez del Vayo
- Succeeded by: Julio Álvarez del Vayo

Minister of the Navy
- In office 18 February 1936 – 22 August 1936
- Prime Minister: Manuel Azaña; Santiago Casares Quiroga
- Preceded by: Antonio Azarola Gresillón
- Succeeded by: Francisco Matz Sánchez
- In office 14 October 1931 – 12 June 1933
- Prime Minister: Juan Negrín
- Preceded by: Santiago Casares Quiroga
- Succeeded by: Lluis Companys

Member of the Congress of Deputies
- In office 16 March 1936 – 31 March 1939
- Constituency: Cáceres
- In office 14 July 1931 – 9 October 1933
- Constituency: Cáceres

Personal details
- Born: 22 October 1879 Santiago de Cuba
- Died: 23 December 1962 (aged 83) Ciudad de Mexico
- Party: Republican Left
- Other political affiliations: Republican Action

José Giral y Pereira (22 October 1879 – 23 December 1962) was a Spanish politician, who served as the 75th Prime Minister of Spain during the Second Spanish Republic.

== Life ==
Giral was born in Santiago de Cuba. He had degrees in Chemistry and Pharmacy from the University of Madrid. In 1905 he became professor of chemistry in the University of Salamanca. He founded Acción Republicana with Manuel Azaña. During the dictatorship of Miguel Primo de Rivera he conspired against the regime, and was imprisoned three times. When the Second Republic was declared, he was named director of the Universidad Complutense de Madrid and advisor of State. Between 1931 and 1933 he served as Minister of the Navy.

After the failure of Diego Martínez Barrio to form a government to restrain the military revolt of 17 July 1936, Azaña ordered Giral to form a new government constituted exclusively by republicans. Giral's government lasted from 19 July to 4 September 1936. Then, with the fall of Talavera de la Reina and the Army of Morocco within reach of Madrid, Giral was forced to cede power to Francisco Largo Caballero.

After the end of the Spanish Civil War he went to France, then to Mexico. In 1945 he succeeded Juan Negrín as prime minister of the Spanish Republican government in Exile until 1947.

He died in Mexico.

He married María Luisa González y de la Calle.

== Cabinet ==
Members of Giral's cabinet of 19 July 1936 – 4 September 1936 were:

Ministry	Start	End	Officeholder	Party
Premier	19 July 1936	4 September 1936	José Giral	Republican Left
State (Foreign Affairs)	19 July 1936	4 September 1936	Augusto Barcía Trelles	Republican Left
Justice	19 July 1936	4 September 1936	Manuel Blasco Garzón	Republican Union
War	19 July 1936	6 August 1936	General Luis Castello Pantoja	Army
War	6 August 1936	4 September 1936	Juan Hernández Saravia	Army
Navy	19 July 1936	22 August 1936	José Giral	Republican Left
Navy	22 August 1936	4 September 1936	Francisco Maíz Sánchez	
Interior	19 July 1936	4 September 1936	General Sebastián Pozas Perea	Army
Finance	19 July 1936	4 September 1936	Enrique Ramos Ramos	Republican Left
Industry and Commerce	19 July 1936	4 September 1936	Plácido Álvarez-Buylla Lozana	Republican Union
Communications and Merchant Marine	19 July 1936	4 September 1936	Bernardo Giner de los Ríos	Republican Union
Public Works	19 July 1936	4 September 1936	Antonio Velao Oñate	Republican Left
Agriculture	19 July 1939	4 September 1936	Mariano Ruiz-Funes García	Republican Left
Education and Fine Arts	19 July 1936	4 September 1936	Francisco Barnés Salinas	Republican Left
Labor, Health and Planning	19 July 1936	4 September 1936	Joan Lluhí	Republican Left of Catalonia

== Sources ==
- Beevor, Antony (2006). The Battle for Spain: the Spanish Civil War, 1936-1939. New York: Penguin Books. ISBN 0-14-303765-X.
- Pike, David Wingeate (2011). France Divided: The French and the Civil War in Spain. Sussex Academic Press. ISBN 978-1-84519-490-1.
- Urquijo y Goitia, José Ramón de (2008). Gobiernos y ministros españoles en la edad contemporánea. Editorial CSIC - CSIC Press. ISBN 978-84-00-08737-1.

Political offices
Preceded by Santiago Casares Quiroga	Minister of the Navy; 1931–1933	Succeeded by Lluis Companys
Preceded by Antonio Azarola Gresillón	Minister of the Navy; 1936	Succeeded by Francisco Matz Sánchez
Preceded by Diego Martínez Barrio	Prime Minister of Spain; 1936	Succeeded by Francisco Largo Caballero
Preceded by Julio Álvarez del Vayo	Minister of State; 1937–1938	Succeeded by Julio Álvarez del Vayo

== See also ==
- Government-in-exile of José Giral
