= Liberal Republican Right =

Liberal Republican Right Derecha Liberal Republicana
- President: Niceto Alcalá-Zamora
- Founded: 1930
- Dissolved: 1936
- Split from: Liberal Party
- Headquarters: Madrid, Spain
- Ideology: Republicanism; Liberal conservatism
- Political position: Centre-right
- International affiliation: None
- Colours: Green

The Liberal Republican Right (Spanish: Derecha Liberal Republicana) was a Spanish political party led by Niceto Alcalá-Zamora, which combined immediately with the incipient republican formation of Miguel Maura just before the Pact of San Sebastián, of which they formed a part, as Alcalá-Zamora was elected president of the Provisional Government of the Republic. After the proclamation of the republic, it participated in the 1931 general election among the lists of the combined republican-socialist coalition, receiving 22 seats.

In August 1931, the party changed its name to the "Progressive Republican Party" (Partido Republicano Progresista). During the constitutional discussions, the progressives, together with the radicals of Lerroux, abandoned the republican socialist coalition. A little later, in January 1932, its right wing, led by Miguel Maura, split off, taking 13 of the delegates of the party to the Conservative Republican Party (Partido Republicano Conservador). The party disappeared at the beginning of the Spanish Civil War.
