= 1931 Spanish general election =

- 28 June 1931

All 470 seats of the Constituent Cortes 236 seats needed for a majority
- Turnout: 70.13%
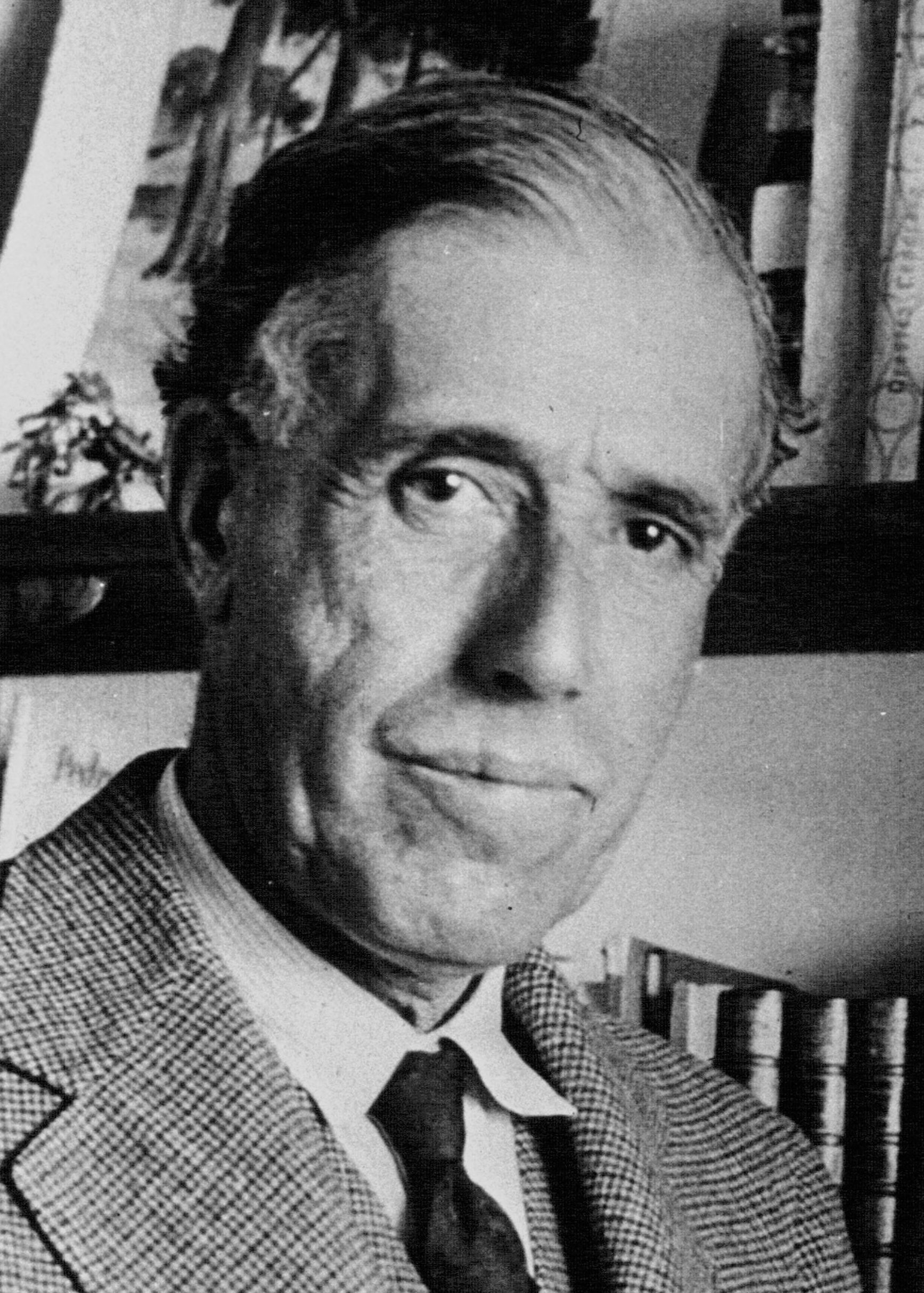

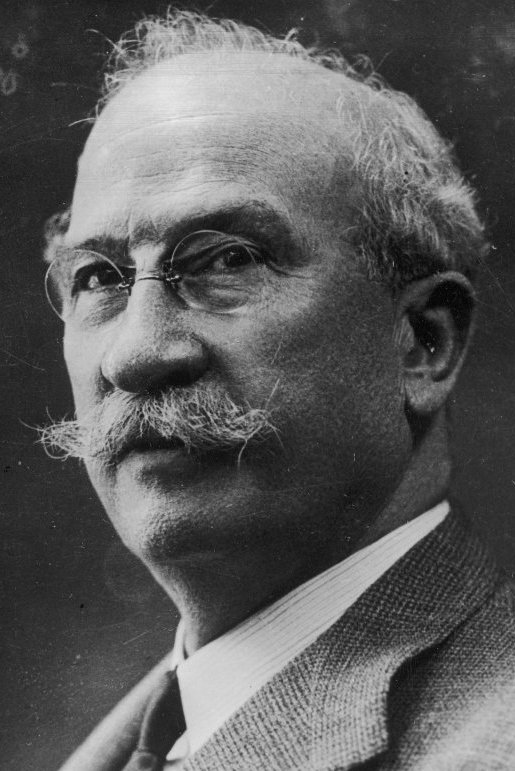

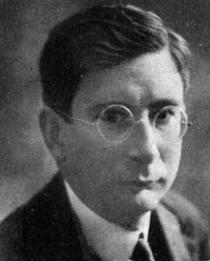

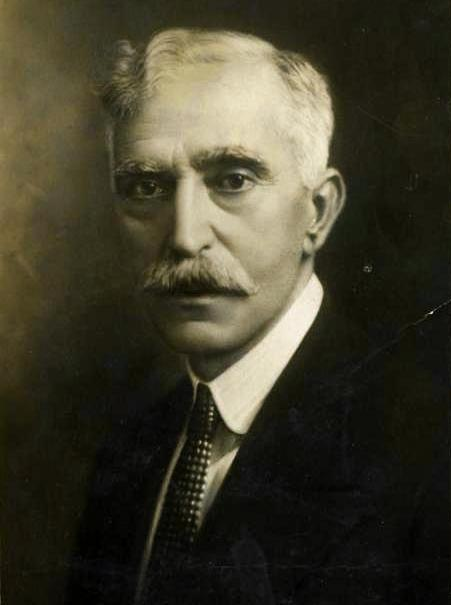

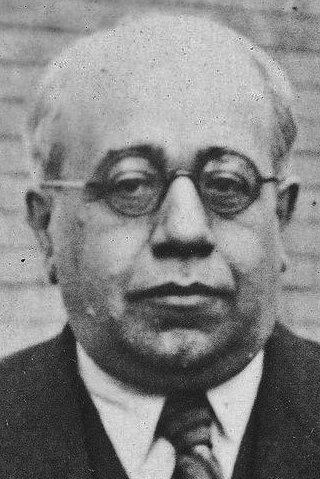

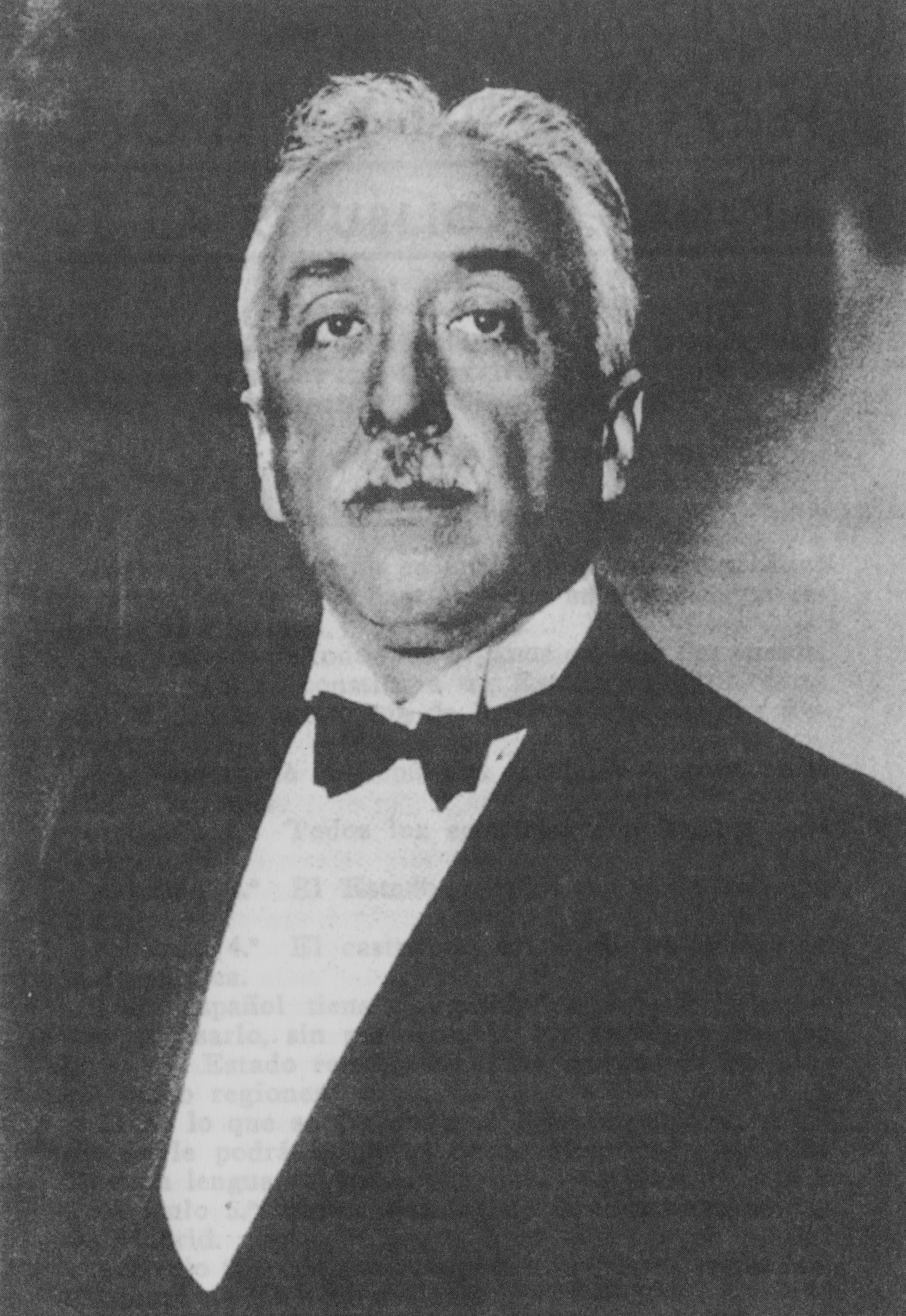
	First party	Second party	Third party
Leader	Julián Besteiro	Alejandro Lerroux	Marcelino Domingo
Party	PSOE	PRR	PRRS
Leader since	9 December 1925	1908	1929
Leader's seat	Madrid-capital	Madrid-capital	Tarragona
Seats won	115	90	61
Seat change	▲115	▲90	▲61
	Fourth party	Fifth party	Sixth party
Leader	Francesc Macià	Manuel Azaña	Niceto Alcalá-Zamora
Party	ERC	AR	DLR
Leader since	19 March 1931	1930	1930
Leader's seat	Lleida	Valencia-capital	Jaén
Seats won	29	26	25
Seat change	▲29	▲26	▲25
Prime Minister before election
Niceto Alcalá-Zamora
DLR
Prime Minister after election
Manuel Azaña
AR

The 1931 Spanish general election for the Constituent Cortes was the first such election held in the Second Republic. It took place in several rounds.

== Background ==
General Primo de Rivera, who had run a military dictatorship in Spain since 1923, resigned as head of government in January 1930. There was little support for a return to the pre-1923 system, and the monarchy had lost credibility by backing the military government. Dámaso Berenguer was ordered by the king to form a replacement government, but his dictablanda dictatorship failed to provide a viable alternative. In the municipal elections of 12 April 1931, little support was shown for pro-monarchy parties in the major cities. King Alfonso XIII fled the country and the Second Spanish Republic was formed.

The Second Republic was a source of hope to the poorest in Spanish society and a threat to the richest, but had broad support from all segments of society. Niceto Alcalá-Zamora was the first prime minister of the Republic. The wealthier landowners and the middle class accepted the Republic because of the lack of any suitable alternative.

== Electoral system ==
An electoral law of May 1931 replaced the previous single-member constituencies with much larger multi-member ones. The Senate was abolished and so the government became unicameral. There would be one seat for every 50,000 people, with a separate seat for any city with more than 100,000 inhabitants. Any electoral list gaining an outright majority of votes in a district would be guaranteed and simultaneously restricted to 80% of the seats. A list winning a plurality of votes but failing to win a majority would receive two thirds of the seats. The remainder would be passed to the second list if it received 20% of the vote. Voters were entitled to vote for as many or as few districts as they liked. The system favoured multi-party coalitions, which could thus win a majority of votes. The election was the first not run by the El Turno Pacífico and encasillado system which assigned seats prior to the election.

Women were unable to vote in this election, but they could stand for and be elected to office. They achieved the vote in the Constitution of December 1931 and were able to vote for the first time in 1933, before those in France and some other countries.

== Campaign ==
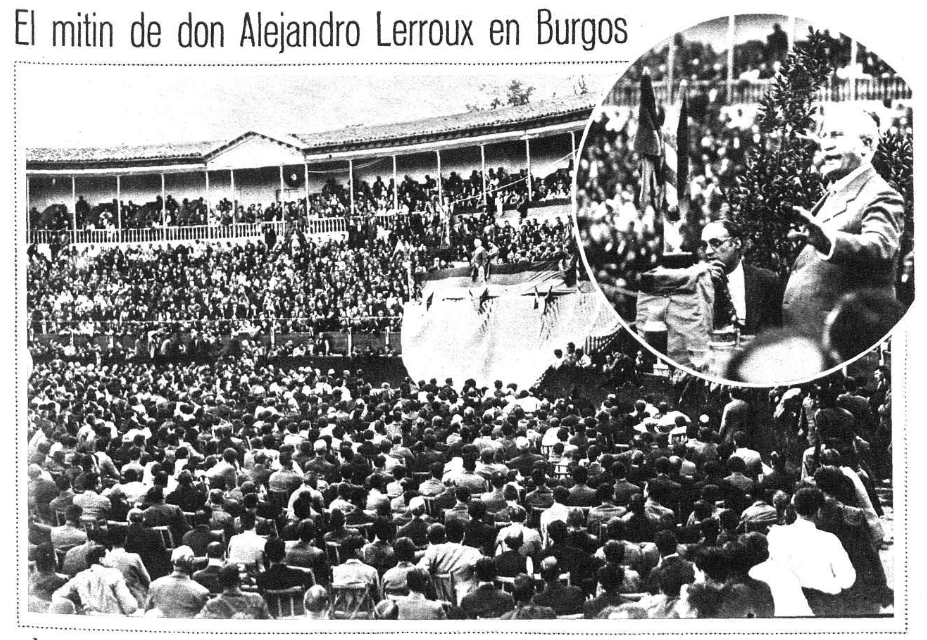
Alejandro Lerroux's meeting in Burgos

The Liberal Republican Right (DLR) was led by Alcalá Zamora and Miguel Maura. Uniquely, it identified as Catholic and did the most to appeal to monarchists and those on the right. However, despite putting up 116 candidates across Spain, it led a poor campaign, which was poorly organised.

Led by Alejandro Lerroux, the Radical Republican Party occupied most of the middle ground and was far more successful at winning conservative, moderate support. Such conservatism was at odds with most republicans, who believed greater reforms were necessary to bring about stability. That was the case with the Radical Socialist Party, led by Álvaro de Albornoz and Marcelino Domingo, which promulgated extremist views. "There is nothing to be conserved", Albornoz argued.

Manuel Azaña led the Republican Action Party. Azaña was keen to change the political system quickly – he hated the moderation and compromise being argued by Lerroux.

The Spanish Socialist Workers' Party stood to the left of the political spectrum, and was kept in line with the coalition by a majority of its leadership, rather than unanimously. A legal revolution was necessary, argued a key figure, Largo Caballero. However, extremists inside and outside of the party loomed as potential competition, and the party's line was thus that the coalition was only a stepping stone to a fully-socialist state.

The official instructions were that civil authorities were not to interfere with the vote; but in some areas ad hoc republican patrols were set up, which undoubtedly deterred some conservatives from voting. Some members of councils stood; some provincial governors did the same, but not it their own area of governance. The Republican-Socialist coalition dominated the campaigning; the right, still reeling at the loss of the monarchy, remained disorganised. Only in one area did the right manage to collectivise sufficiently: the Basque Country. Many members of the right switched to republicans, despite having little in common with them: one group in Asturias went under the contradictory name the "Monarchist-Republican Party".

== Results ==
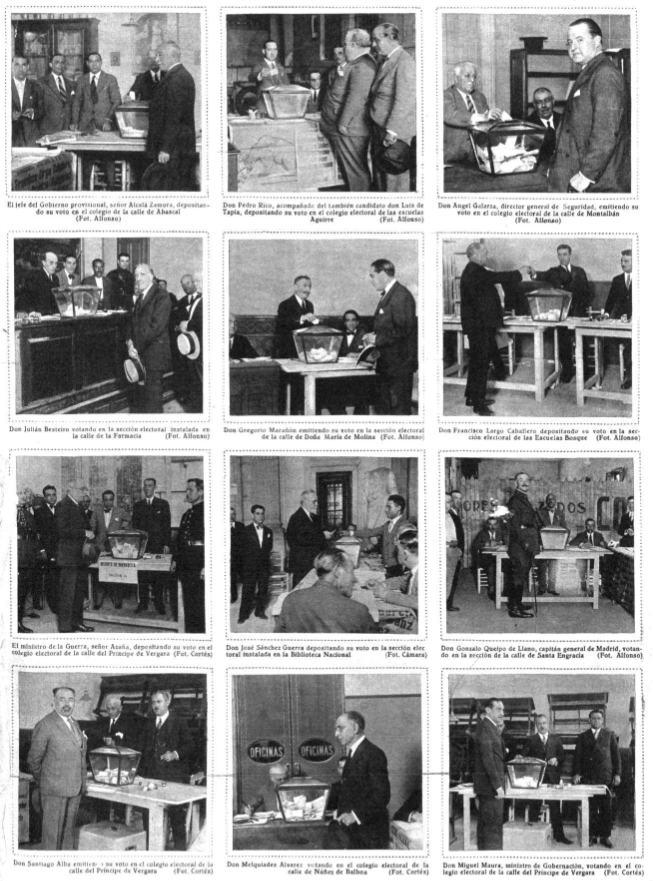
Political leaders voting. From left to right: Niceto Alcalá-Zamora, Pedro Rico, Ángel Galarza, Julián Besteiro, Gregorio Marañón, Francisco Largo Caballero, Manuel Azaña, José Sánchez Guerra, Gonzalo Queipo de Llano, Santiago Alba Bonifaz, Melquíades Álvarez and Miguel Maura Gamazo.

The Republic and Socialist coalition won a huge victory and was helped by a public that was more liberally inclined than in 1933 or 1936. The lowest turnout, 56%, was in Ceuta; the highest, 88%, in Palencia. Broadly speaking, turnout was higher in the north than in the south. Overall, turnout was around 70% which was considered high. The Socialists won around 2,000,000 votes; Republicans 1,700,000, Radical Socialists 1,350,000 and the Liberal Republican Right 950,000. (Note: Payne notes the difficulty in separating votes between parties because of the wide range of coalitions and other problems.)

=== Votes ===
Summary of the 28 June 1931 election results:

Electoral alliance	% vote	Seats won
Combined Socialist–Republican Coalition^{+}	34.28%	193
PSOE and the Leftist Coalition^{+}	14.56%	80
Catalan Leftists (Note: Included the ERC, ECRS and the Radical Republican Party.)	9.64%	42
Galician Republican Party (Partido Republicano Gallego) and allies^{+}	3.73%	24
Spanish Radical Republican Socialist Party (Partido Republicano Radical Socialista Español)^{+}	3.53%	13
Democratic Federal Republican Party (Partido Republicano Democrático Federal) and Federalist independents	1.06%	7
Communist Party	0.77%	–
Socialist Revolution Party (Partido Social Revolucionario)	0.57%	1
Extreme Federal Left Party	0.30%	2
Radical Republican Party (Partido Republicano Radical) and allies^{+} (Note: Included the PRR, DLR, and RS.)	10.59%	42
Liberal Republican Right (Derecha Liberal Republicana) and allies^{+}	4.39%	8
Liberal Democratic Republican Party (Partido Republicano Liberal Demócrata) and Supporters of the Republic	1.05%	4
Gallician Independents	0.78%	5
Other Republican Independents	0.74%	2
Republican Party of the Center (Partido Republicano de Centro) (Note: Only stood in the Balearic Islands.)	0.56%	2
Republican Action (Acción Republicana)^{+}	0.47%	–
Republican Catalan Party (Partido Catalanista Republicà)^{+}	0.31%	1
Agrarian Party	3.41%	17
Catholic-Fuerista Coalition	3.59%	15
National Action (Acción Nacional)	2.34%	7
Regionalist League (Lliga Regionalista)^{+}	1.97%	3
Independent Catholics of the Right	0.72%	–
Monarchist Independent	0.17%	1
Monarchist League (Unión Monárquica)	0.10%	1
Basque Nationalist Action (Acción Nacionalista Vasca)	0.08%	–
Other Socialists	0.29%	–
Coalitions marked ^{+} also formed part of the Combined Socialist–Republican Coalition in some seats.
Totals:	100.00%	470

=== Seats ===
Distribution of seats.

Party divisions at the start of the Cortes, after seats had been awarded between coalitions:

Affiliation	Party	Name in Spanish or Catalan	Abbreviation	Seats
Marxist and/or revolutionary Left
Marxist and/or revolutionary Left	Spanish Socialist Workers' Party	Partido Socialista Obrero Español	PSOE	115
Marxist and/or revolutionary Left	Socialist Union of Catalonia	Unió Socialista de Catalunya	USC	4
Marxist and/or revolutionary Left	Revolutionary Antifascist Left	Izquierda Revolucionaria Antifascista	IRA	2
Marxist and/or revolutionary Left	Extreme Federal Left	Extrema Izquierda Federal	EIF	2
Marxist and/or revolutionary Left	Leftist Federal independents	–	–	2
Marxist and/or revolutionary Left	Workers and Peasants' Bloc (Note: Trotskyist Communists. Stood only in Madrid and Catalonia.)	Bloc Obrer i Camperol/Bloque Obrero y Campesino	IRA	–
Marxist and/or revolutionary Left	Communist Party of Spain	Partido Comunista de España	PCE	–
Republican Left
Republican Left	Radical Socialist Republican Party	Partido Republicano Radical Socialista	PRSS	59
Republican Left	Republican Action (Note: Stood only in coalition with other parties.)	Acción Republicana	AR	26
Republican Left	Democratic Federal Republican Party	Partido Republicano Democrático Federal	PRD Fed.	16
Republican Left	The Association of Service to the Republic	Agrupación al Servicio de la República	ASR	13
Republican Left	Radical Socialist Catalan Left (Note: Linked to the PRRS)	Esquerra Catalana Radical Socialista	ECRS	2
Republican Left	Republican Independents	–	–	6
Nationalist Left
Nationalist Left	Republican Left of Catalonia	Esquerra Republicana de Catalunya	ERC	29
Nationalist Left	Federation of Galician Republicans (Note: Included ORGA and the Galician Republican Party.)	Federación Republicana Gallega	FRG	14
Nationalist Left	Nationalist Republican Party	Partido Nazonalista Repubricán	PNzR	1
Republicans of the Centre and of the Right
Republicans of the Centre and of the Right	Radical Republican Party	Partido Republicano Radical	PRR	90
Republicans of the Centre and of the Right	Liberal Republican Right	Derecha Liberal Republicana	DLR	25
Republicans of the Centre and of the Right	Liberal Democrat Republican Party	Partido Republicano Liberal Demócrata	PRLD	4
Republicans of the Centre and of the Right	Centre Republican Party	Partido Republicano de Centro	PRCe	2
Republicans of the Centre and of the Right	Supporters of the Republic	Apoyo a la República	AAR	2
Republicans of the Centre and of the Right	Provincial Republican Association	Agrupación Republicana Provincial	ARP	2
Republicans of the Centre and of the Right	Independents of the Centre	–	–	4
Regionalists and Nationalists of the Centre and of the Right
Regionalists and Nationalists of the Centre and of the Right	Basque Nationalist Party (Note: In coalition with the CT.)	Partido Nacionalista Vasco	PNV	7
Regionalists and Nationalists of the Centre and of the Right	Galician Independents (Note: Formed the Galicianist Party in December 1931.)	–	–	5
Regionalists and Nationalists of the Centre and of the Right	Catalan League	Lliga Catalana	LR	2
Regionalists and Nationalists of the Centre and of the Right	Catalan Republican Party (Note: Formed in March 1931 from the Catalan Action (Acció Catalana) and Republican Catalan Action (Acció Republicana de Catalunya) parties.)	Partit Catalanista Republicà	PCR	2
Regionalists and Nationalists of the Centre and of the Right	Agrarian Republican Autonomy Party	Partido Agrario Republicano Autonomista	PARA	1
Regionalists and Nationalists of the Centre and of the Right	Independents (pro-Statute of Estella)	–	–	3
Parties of the Right
Parties of the Right	Agrarian Independents	–	–	15
Parties of the Right	National Action (Note: Became part of CEDA in 1932.)	Acción Nacional	AN	5
Monarchist parties of the Right
Monarchist parties of the Right	Traditionalist Communion (Note: In coalition with the PNV.)	Comunión Tradicionalista (Carlista)	CT	4
Monarchist parties of the Right	Agrarian Catholics	Católico Agrarios	CA	3
Monarchist parties of the Right	Monarchist Union	Unión Monárquica	CT	1
Monarchist parties of the Right	Traditional Catholic Party (Note: In coalition with the CT and PNV.)	Partido Católico Tradicionalista	PCT	1
Monarchist parties of the Right	Liberal Monarchists	Monárquico Liberal	ML	1
Total:				470
