= Gregorio Marañón =

Spanish academic (1887–1960)

Gregorio Marañón OWL
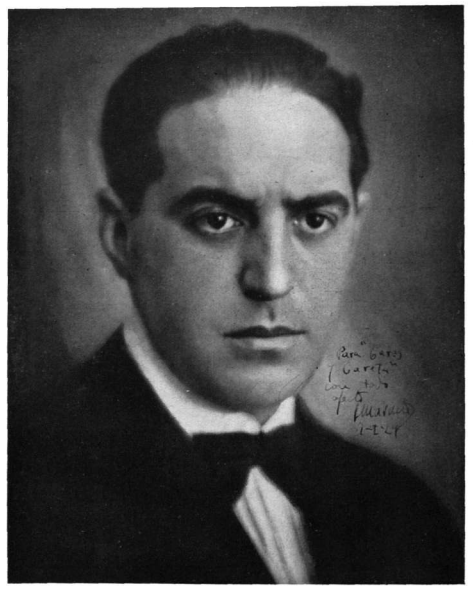
- Born: 19 May 1887; Madrid, Spain
- Died: 27 March 1960 (aged 72); Madrid, Spain
- Citizenship: Spanish
- Spouse: Dolores Moya
- Scientific career
- Fields: Endocrinology; Psychology; Historical essay

Seat K of the Real Academia Española
- In office 8 April 1934 – 27 March 1960
- Preceded by: Juan Armada y Losada
- Succeeded by: Samuel Gili Gaya

Gregorio Marañón y Posadillo, OWL ([ɡɾeˈɣoɾjo maɾaˈɲon]; 19 May 1887 – 27 March 1960) was a Spanish physician, scientist, historian, writer and philosopher. He married Dolores Moya in 1911, and they had four children (Carmen, Belén, María Isabel and Gregorio).

== Life and work ==
An austere, humanist and liberal man, he was a prominent Spanish intellectual of the 20th century. He was noted for his extensive scholarly work and for his literary style characterized by clarity and precision. Like many contemporaries, he engaged in social and political life: he was a Republican and opposed the Miguel Primo de Rivera dictatorship—an opposition that resulted in a one-month prison sentence— and expressed criticism of Spanish communism. He initially supported the Second Spanish Republic, but later criticised it because of its lack of cohesion among the Spanish people.

Probably after going away from Madrid (around January 1937), and when asked his opinion of republican Spain, Marañón spoke in a meeting of French intellectuals as follows: "You don't need to try very hard, my friends; listen to this: eighty-eight percent of teachers from Madrid, Valencia and Barcelona (the three universities which, alongside Murcia's, had stayed on the republican side) have been forced to exile abroad. And do you know why? Simply because they were afraid of being murdered by the reds (communists in Spain), despite many of the threatened intellectuals were thought of as left-wing men."

In the article "Liberalism and Communism", published in Revue de Paris on 15 December 1937, he clearly expressed his change of opinion towards the Second Republic:

[...] In History there is one absolutely forbidden thing: to judge what could have happened if what happened hadn't happened. But what is beyond discussion is that the prophecies from the extreme right-wing or monarchic sides that opposed to the Republic were completely fulfilled: non-stop chaos, strikes with no motivation, burnings of churches, religious prosecution, taking away the power from the liberals, who had sponsored the movement and who didn't fall into classes politics; refusal to admit in normality to right-wing people who obeyed the regime in good faith, although they logically weren't ignited with republican extremism. The liberal heard these prophecies with suicidal disdain. It would be an outrageous lie today to say otherwise. Many centuries of success in the governing of the people (some not extinguished yet, as the English and American democracies) had given to the liberal person an excessive, sometimes conceited confidence in his superiority. Almost all of the statues that, in the streets of America and Europe, sow the people the homage to the great men, have written on their plinths the name of a liberal. Whichever the political future of Spain may be, there is no doubt that in this stage of its history, it was the reactionary, and not the liberal, who got it right.

From December 1936 to the autumn of 1942, Marañón lived abroad, in a de facto exile. Back in Spain again, the dictatorship (as it did with other intellectuals) used his figure to improve its exterior image. In overall terms, the Francoist state respected him. Miguel Artola, in 1987, stated that the biggest political contribution of Marañón was clearly having raised the flag of freedom, in a time when only a very few could do so, understanding liberalism as the opposite to a specific political position. In this sense, he stated:

"Being liberal is, precisely, these two things: first, being open to understanding with those who think differently, and second, never admitting that the end justifies the means, but the other way around, the means justify the end. [...] Therefore, liberalism is a behaviour, and so, it is much more than politics".

— Prologue of his book Liberal Essays, 1946

His experience as a kind of insider served his knowledge about the Spanish state. After the student riots at the University of Madrid in 1956, he led, along with Menéndez Pidal, protests denouncing the dire political situation under Francoist rule, asking for the return of those exiled.

His early contribution to Medicine was focused on endocrinology; in fact, he was one of its forefathers. During his first year of graduate school (1909), he published seven works in the Clinical Magazine of Madrid, of which only one was related to endocrinology, about the autoimmune polyendocrine syndrome. In 1910, he published five works, two of them related to endocrinology, about Addison's disease. In the following years, his attraction to endocrinology only grew larger. In 1930, he published Endocrinology (printed in Madrid by Espasa-Calpe) and thirty more works in scientific journals on that speciality, of which half were works as the only author, which is remarkable, taking into account the political-historical context in which Marañón was directly or indirectly involved. He wrote the first treatise of internal medicine in Spain, along with Doctor Hernando, and his book Manual of Etiologic Diagnostic (1946) was one of the most widespread medical books in the world, because of its new focus on the study of diseases and its copious and unprecedented clinical contributions.

In addition to his medical work, he wrote on a wide range of subjects, including history, art, travel, cooking, clothing, hairstyle, and footwear. In his works, he developed what he termed "biological essays", in which he examined historical figures by relating their behaviour and actions to psychic and physiopathological factors. Examples include analyses of shyness in Amiel, resentment in Tiberio, the exercise of power in The Count-Duke of Olivares, political intrigue and betrayal in Antonio Pérez —a figure associated with the development of the so-called Spanish "black legend"— and the concept of "donjuanism" in Don Juan, etc. He was a member of five of the eight Spanish Real Academies, which he actively collaborated with.

Pedro Laín Entralgo recognised as many as five different personalities in this doctor from Madrid: the doctor Marañón; the writer Marañón; the historian Marañón, who greatly contributed to his "universality"; the moralist Marañón; and the Spanish Marañón. What makes his work even more singular is the "human" perspective that summarizes the multiplicity of domains that he is involved in, partaking in the scientific, ethical, moral, religious, cultural, and historical.

He served as a physician for the Royal House and for numerous figures from Spanish public life. He also worked in public healthcare at the Hospital Provincial de Madrid (now Hospital General Universitario Gregorio Marañón), where in 1911 he was appointed at his own request in the unit of infectious diseases. The hospital, one of the largest in Madrid, and several streets and educational institutions all over Spain are currently named after him.

== Foundation ==
The Gregorio Marañón Foundation was established on 11 November 1988, with the aim of "perpetuating the thought and work of Doctor Marañón, spreading the high magistrature of Medicine he worked in and promoting research in the fields of Medicine and Bioethics". Furthermore, " a cornerstone of the Foundation is the localization and recuperation of all the biographic and bibliographic documents to constitute a Documentary Fund available to all the learners who want to analyse and go deeper into the signification and validity of the thinking and work of Gregorio Marañón". A Marañón Week has been annually held since 1990. The Marañón Week of 1999 was devoted to the topic of emotion, in 2000, held in Oviedo, was devoted to Benito Jerónimo Feijoo, in 2001, to the figure of don Juan, in 2002, held in the University Hospital Complex of Albacete, to the "Medical Work of Marañón", in 2006, held in Valencia, to "Luis Vives: Spanish humanist in Europe" and in 2009, to the "liberal tradition". On 9 July 2010, the José Ortega y Gasset Foundation and the Gregorio Marañón Foundation fused, creating a sole organization: the José Ortega y Gasset-Gregorio Marañón Foundation, also known as the Ortega-Marañón Foundation. However, the website of the new foundation, which still stands as http://www.ortegaygasset.edu, barely reveals any activity or interest related to Marañón.

== Ateneo of Madrid ==
It is worth noting that it was not the Foundation, but the Ateneo of Madrid, who celebrated the 50th anniversary of the death of Marañón, on 19 October 2010. In 1924, Marañón "had been promoted to president of the Ateneo by acclamation of his partners, that viewed him as his true president, but his presidency was de facto because the dictatorship of Primo de Rivera did not allow the electoral session. After the factious assembly, not recognised by the associates, Marañón was appointed as president of the Ateneo in March of 1930."

== Legacy ==
Marañón’s sign is named after him, a clinical sign that increases the suspicion of a substernal goiter in patients.

== Books ==
- Tiberius: A Study in Resentment (1956) – translated from Tiberio: Historia de un resentimiento (1939)
- The Climacteric (the critical age) (1929) - Translated from La edad crítica (1925)

== Bibliography ==
- (in Spanish)
