= Diego Martínez Barrio =

Spanish politician

The Most Excellent Diego Martínez Barrio OIC
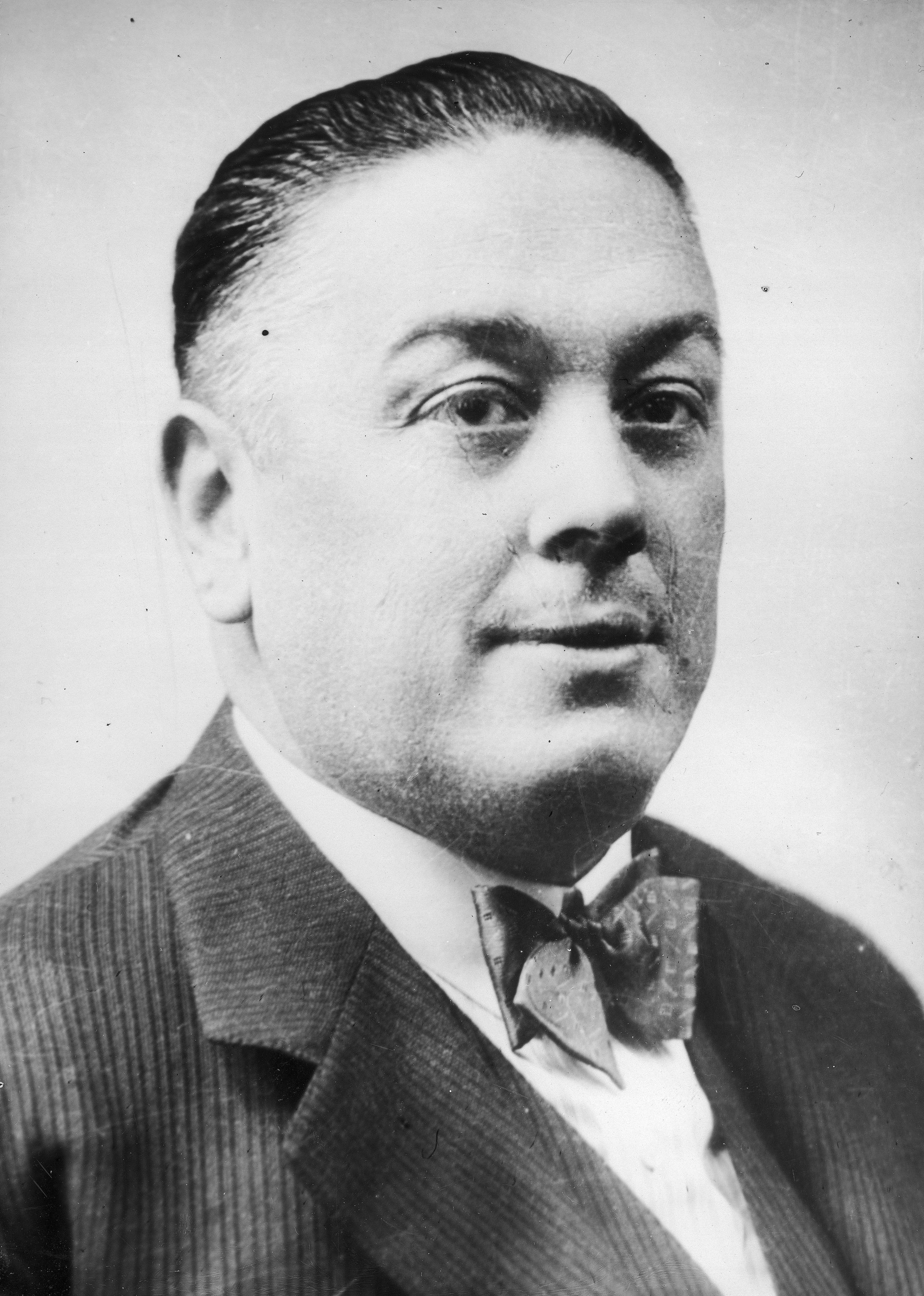
- Portrait, c. 1930s

President of the Spanish Republic Interim
- In office 7 April 1936 – 10 May 1936
- Preceded by: Niceto Alcalá-Zamora
- Succeeded by: Manuel Azaña

Prime Minister of Spain
- In office 8 October 1933 – 16 December 1933
- President: Niceto Alcala-Zamora
- Preceded by: Alejandro Lerroux
- Succeeded by: Alejandro Lerroux
- In office 19 July 1936 – 19 July 1936
- President: Manuel Azaña
- Preceded by: Santiago Casares Quiroga
- Succeeded by: José Giral

Personal details
- Born: 25 November 1883 Seville, Spain
- Died: 1 January 1962 (aged 78) Paris, France
- Party: Republican Union
- Other political affiliations: Radical Republican Party; Popular Front
- Profession: Politician, journalist

Diego Martínez Barrio (25 November 1883, in Seville – 1 January 1962) was a Spanish politician during the Second Spanish Republic, Prime Minister of Spain between 9 October 1933 and 26 December 1933 and was briefly appointed again by Manuel Azaña on 19 July 1936 - two days after the beginning of the Spanish Civil War. From 16 March 1936 to 30 March 1939 Martínez was President of the Cortes. In 1936, he was briefly the interim President of the Second Spanish Republic, from 7 April to 10 May.

== Biography ==
Barrio was born in Seville. A member of the Radical Republican Party, he was the Minister in the Alejandro Lerroux government but later he left the party for dissatisfaction with the politics of Lerroux.

Martínez consequently founded and led the Republican Union and participated in the Spanish Popular Front, being elected to government in 1936. He led the integration of the Republican Union into the Popular Front, being elected the speaker of the Cortes (Spanish Parliament).. Following the resignation of Santiago Casares Quiroga two days after the outbreak of the civil war, he was appointed prime minister on 19 July 1936. As part of his intention to avert war, his cabinet ignored the left wing of the Popular Front, but he would last just a few hours, and he resigned later the same morning, after an unsuccessful appeal to Nationalist General Emilio Mola to avoid war, and was succeeded by José Giral.. In February 1939, he rejected to replace Manuel Azaña as president of the Republic. He fled the country after Francisco Franco came to power in 1939.

He was the Grand Master of the Grande Oriente Español from 1929 to 1934.

After the fall of the Republic, he went into exile, first to France and then to Mexico, where, in 1945, he was designated president of the Republic in exile until 1962. Martínez finally returned to Paris, where he died.

In 2000, his remains were moved to Seville.

== Bibliography ==
- Beevor, Antony. The battle for Spain. The Spanish civil war. Penguin Books. 2006. London. ISBN 0-14-303765-X.
- Thomas, Hugh. The Spanish Civil War. Penguin Books. London. 2003. ISBN 978-0-14-101161-5

Political offices
Preceded by Office created	Minister for Communications; 1931	Succeeded by Santiago Casares Quiroga (acting)
Preceded by Alejandro Lerroux	Prime Minister of Spain; 1933	Succeeded by Alejandro Lerroux
Preceded by Vicente Iranzo Enguita	Minister of War; 1933–1934	Succeeded by Diego Hidalgo Durán
Preceded by Manuel Rico Avelló	Minister of Government; 1934	Succeeded by Rafael Salazar Alonso
Preceded by Santiago Alba Bonifaz	President of the Congress of Deputies; 1936–1939	Succeeded by Esteban Bilbao Eguía
Preceded by Niceto Alcalá Zamora	President of the Spanish Republic; Acting; 1936	Succeeded by Manuel Azaña
Preceded by Santiago Casares Quiroga	Prime Minister of Spain; 1936	Succeeded by José Giral
