= Republican Action (Spain) =

Republican Action Acción Republicana
- Leader: Manuel Azaña
- Founded: 1925
- Dissolved: 1934
- Preceded by: Reformist Party
- Merged into: Republican Left
- Headquarters: Madrid
- Ideology: Republicanism; Social liberalism Decentralization
- Political position: Centre-left
- National affiliation: Republican Alliance (1926–31)

Republican Action (AR; Spanish: Acción Republicana) was a Spanish left-liberal republican party between 1930 and 1934.

== History ==
The AR was founded in 1925 under the name Acción Política ("Political Action") by Manuel Azaña and José Giral. Political Action became a political party in 1930 under the name Republican Action. The party was anticlerical, and supported decentralization, agrarian reform and military reform.

As a member of the Republican Alliance (Spanish: Alianza Republicana), the AR was a signatory of the Pact of San Sebastián to overthrow the monarchy of Alfonso XIII and was later involved in the construction and consolidation of the Second Spanish Republic. It was a member of the provisional government which governed Spain after the King fled in April 1931.

The party's left-wing faction, led by Marcelino Domingo split off from the party to form the Radical Socialist Republican Party in 1931.

The party won 30 seats in the 1931 election and soon became, despite its small size, an integral part of governments until 1933 notably under its leader Manuel Azaña. After the defeat of the left in the 1933 election, during which the AR won only 10 seats, it merged with the Autonomous Galician Republican Organization (ORGA) and Domingo's Radical Socialist Republican Party in 1934 to form the Republican Left (Izquierda Republicana).

The AR was a typical left-liberal party. It attracted the support of the petite bourgeoisie, like teachers, lawyers and shopkeepers.

== AR Ministers ==
- Manuel Azaña
- José Giral
- Claudio Sánchez-Albornoz y Menduiña

== Election results ==
Election	Leader	% Votes	Seats won	+/–	Notas
1931	Manuel Azaña	5.5%	26 / 470	▲26	Inside Republican–Socialist Conjunction.
1933	Manuel Azaña	1.1%	5 / 472	▼21	Coalition with PRRSI.

== See also ==
- Grupo de Acción Republicana

== Bibliography ==
- Barrio Alonso, Ángeles (2004). La modernización de España (1917-1939). Política y sociedad. Madrid: Síntesis. ISBN 84-9756-223-2.
- González Calleja, Eduardo (2005). La España de Primo de Rivera. La modernización autoritaria 1923-1930. Madrid: Alianza Editorial. ISBN 84-206-4724-1.
- Juliá, Santos (2009). La Constitución de 1931. Madrid: Iustel. ISBN 978-84-9890-083-5.
