= Santiago Casares Quiroga =

Spanish lawyer

The Most Excellent Santiago Casares Quiroga OIC
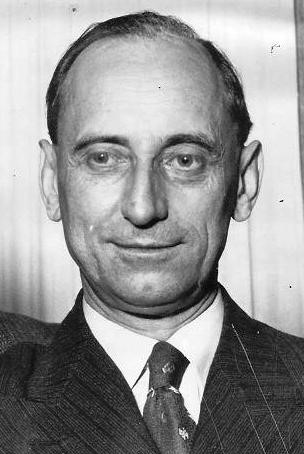

Prime Minister of Spain
- In office 13 May 1936 – 19 July 1936
- President: Manuel Azaña
- Preceded by: Augusto Barcia Trelles
- Succeeded by: Diego Martínez Barrio

Personal details
- Born: 8 May 1884 A Coruña, Spain
- Died: 17 February 1950 (aged 65) Paris, France
- Party: ORGA; Republican Left
- Spouse: Gloria Pérez
- Children: María Casares
- Occupation: Lawyer and lover

Santiago Casares y Quiroga (8 May 1884 – 17 February 1950) was Prime Minister of Spain from 13 May to 19 July 1936. Casares Quiroga resigned just 48 hours after the beginning of the military insurrection that led to the Spanish Civil War.

== Biography ==
Casares Quiroga was one of seven siblings born at A Coruña, the son of Santiago Casares Paz and Rogelia Quiroga Moredo. He inherited the republican ideology from his father, a freemason who was elected mayor of A Coruña in 1917. Also like his father, Casares Quiroga was an atheist.

Leader and founder of the Autonomous Galician Republican Organization (ORGA), a Galician regionalist party, Casares participated in the Pact of San Sebastián in 1930, a platform composed of the principal parties of the republican opposition which aimed to bring down the monarchy of Alfonso XIII. He served as a representative of the Galician Republican Federation, a republican group formed by his ORGA along with other Galician republican forces such as the Radical Party, the Federalists and the Radical Socialists.

In December 1930, he was sent clandestinely to Jaca as a delegate of the National Revolutionary Committee (CRN), to prevent Captain Fermín Galán Rodríguez from raising the Jaca garrison in advance of the date agreed by the CRN. Casares Quiroga did not arrive in time to stop Galán, and the Jaca uprising took place on 12 December 1930 without success. As a result, Casares Quiroga was imprisoned.

With the proclamation of the Second Spanish Republic in April 1931, he was named Minister of the Navy in the provisional government, becoming later the Minister of Governance (Interior). He was elected a deputy for ORGA in the Constituent Cortes and remained Minister of Governance during the socialist-republican biennium (1931–1933) in the government of Manuel Azaña, Casares’ personal friend.

He was reelected to the Cortes in 1933, and in 1934 joined his party (now the Galician Republican Party) with Azaña’s and others to create the Republican Left, a party which would then become a part of the Popular Front. Casares Quiroga was again reelected in February 1936 and was named Minister of Public Works. After Azaña became President of the Republic in May, Casares Quiroga on 10 May became the 132nd Prime Minister and Minister of War. As the prime minister, he organized the referendum on the Galician Statute of Autonomy (the third statute of autonomy under the Republic, after Catalonia and the Basque Country), which was approved on 28 June 1936.

He was serving as prime minister when the military conspiracy and then uprising of 17 July 1936 took place, which then developed into the Spanish Civil War. Incapable of confronting the rebellion, Casares resigned on 19 July and was replaced by Diego Martínez Barrio, whose government was never confirmed, and then definitely by José Giral. Historians have generally agreed that Casares refused to deliver arms to the revolutionary workers’ organizations as the right-wing uprising unfolded. The memoirs of his daughter María Casares denied this.

He did not hold any other office during the Civil War and left for France along with Azaña and Martínez Barrio after the fall of Catalonia. Casares Quiroga died in exile in 1950. He was the father of actress María Casares.

== Sources ==
- Xenealoxía.org

Political offices
Preceded by Augusto Barcía	Prime Minister of Spain; 1936	Succeeded by Diego Martínez Barrio
