= Autonomous Galician Republican Organization =

Autonomous Galician Republican Organization Organización Republicana Galega Autónoma
- Leader: Santiago Casares Quiroga
- Founded: 1929
- Dissolved: 1934
- Ideology: Republicanism; Social liberalism Galicianism; Autonomism
- Congreso de los Diputados (1931): 16 / 470

The Autonomous Galician Republican Organization (Galician: Organización Republicana Galega Autónoma, ORGA) was a Spanish left-wing republican and Galician nationalist party in Galicia. It was founded in October 1929 in A Coruña by Santiago Casares Quiroga and Antón Vilar Ponte with the participation of the Irmandades da Fala.

In March 1930, it organized the Galician Republican Federation (FRG) with the support of the Radical Republican Party and the Radical Socialist Republican Party. Represented by Casares Quiroga, it was a signatory of the Pact of San Sebastián. The Radicals left the Galician Republican Federation following the proclamation of the Republic although the FRG continued to exist until 1932. The federation won 16 seats in the 1931 election.

Santiago Casares Quiroga was a cabinet minister in republican governments between 1931 and 1933. In 1932, the Argentine section of ORGA led by Ramón Suárez Picallo participated in the foundation of the Partido Galeguista led by Castelao.

Following the dissolution of the FRG in 1932, the ORGA became known as the Galician Republican Party until it merged with the Acción Republicana and the Radical Socialist Republican Party in 1934 to form the Republican Left (Izquierda Republicana).
