= Radical Socialist Republican Party =

Radical Socialist Republican Party Partido Republicano Radical Socialista
- President: Félix Gordón Ordás
- Founded: 1929
- Dissolved: 1934
- Split from: Radical Republican Party
- Merged into: Republican Union
- Headquarters: Barcelona
- Ideology: Republicanism; Radicalism; Anti-clericalism; Social democracy
- Political position: Left-wing
- Colours: Red, Yellow and Murrey

The Radical Socialist Republican Party (PRRS; Spanish: Partido Republicano Radical Socialista), sometimes shortened to Radical Socialist Party (PRS; Partido Radical Socialista), was a Spanish radical political party, created in 1929 after the split of the left-wing in Alejandro Lerroux's Radical Republican Party (PRR, created in 1908, and in decline at the time). Its main leaders were Marcelino Domingo, Álvaro de Albornoz, and Félix Gordón Ordás.

== History ==
PRRS was an important force in the elections of 1931, winning 54 seats in the Cortes Generales that proclaimed the Second Spanish Republic on April 14. It suffered a major setback by 1933, when it only gained five seats. In the meantime, it formed part of Prime Minister Manuel Azaña's coalition between Left Republican parties and the Spanish Socialist Workers' Party (PSOE); Álvaro de Albornoz was one of the architects of the secular legislation passed by the Cortes, and also served as Justice Minister.

The party was shaken by several crises during its existence. In 1932, Juan Botella Asensi left the PRRS to found his own group (IRS, Izquierda Radical-Socialista – Radical-Socialist Left); the following year, it was split over the issue of collaboration with the PSOE: the left-wing, led by Domingo and Albornoz, argued for continued participation in government, while the right-wing of Gordón de Ordás favored an agreement with Lerroux's PRR.

Towards the end of 1933, the leftists created the Independent Radical Socialist Republican Party (PRRSI), which fused with Republican Action and the Autonomous Galician Republican Organization to create the Republican Left in 1934. The remainder of the party, now dominated by moderates, merged with the Radical Democratic Party of Diego Martínez Barrio into the Republican Union. Both the Republican Left and the Republican Union ended up joining the Popular Front in 1936.

== See also ==
- 1929 Spanish coup d'état
