= Radical Republican Party =

Radical Republican Party Partido Republicano Radical
- President: Alejandro Lerroux
- Founded: 6 January 1908
- Dissolved: 13 September 1936
- Split from: Republican Union
- Ideology: Republicanism; Liberalism; Anti-Catalanism; Spanish nationalism Restoration: Radicalism; Anti-clericalism; Working-class interests Jacobinism; 2nd Republic: Pragmatism; Classical liberalism Moderatism
- Political position: Restoration: Left-wing; 2nd Republic: Centre to centre-right
- Colours: Red, yellow, murrey

The Radical Republican Party (Spanish: Partido Republicano Radical), sometimes shortened to the Radical Party, was a Spanish Radical party in existence between 1908 and 1936. Beginning as a splinter from earlier Radical parties, it initially played a minor role in Spanish parliamentary life, before it came to prominence as one of the leading political forces of the Spanish Republic.

== Origins (1908-1930) ==
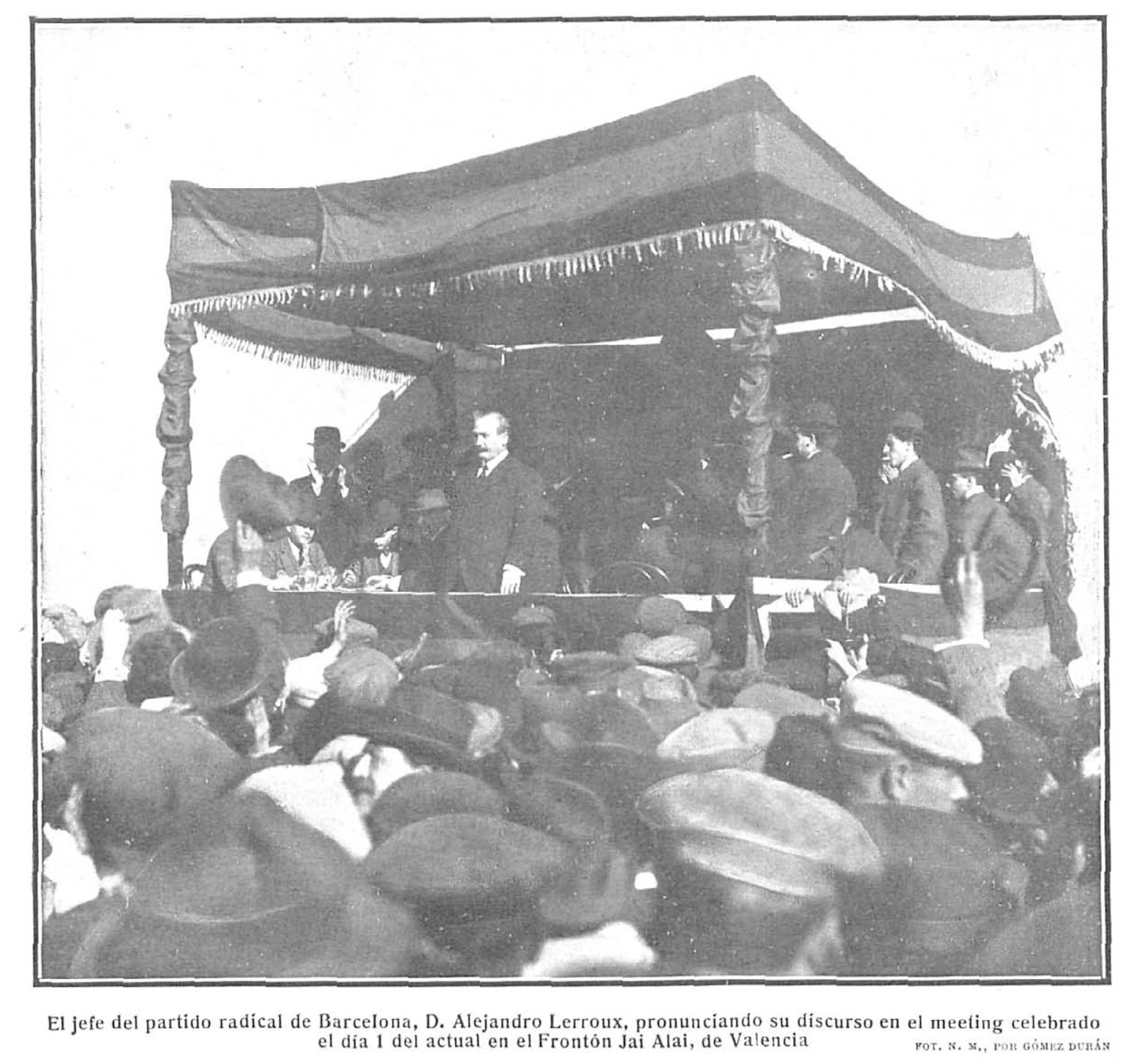
Lerroux delivering a speech in a meeting in Valencia, 1911. Photographed by Mundo Gráfico

The Radical Republican Party was founded on 6 January 1908 in Santander by the Lerrouxist wing of the Republican Union, which splintered in disagreement from Nicolas Salmerón's policy of alliance with Catalan regionalists.

Initially, its structure was loose enough and its Radicalism broad enough to contain many different tendencies, notably a Radical-Socialist left wing led by Alvaro de Albornoz, a centrist wing led by Diego Martínez-Barrio and a right wing led (from 1910) by Alejandro Lerroux. Over time the left factions periodically splintered off to form more socially-progressive Radical parties such as the Radical Socialist Republican Party in 1928. Consequently, by the early 1930s, the original Radical Republican Party had been pushed from the left to the centre and the centre-right, preferring to make alliances with anti-socialist and nationalist parties of the liberal and religious right. That process (see sinistrisme) was broadly similar to the path taken in France by the antisocialist anticlericals known as the National Radicals.

In its early years, the party was heavily anchored in Lerroux's fiefdom of Barcelona, which rendered difficult the task of creating either a social-democratic political movement or a regionally-focused Catalanist Radical movement.

In 1910, the Radical-Republicans first entered parliament, via an electoral bloc with socialists and other Radicals and republicans, known as the Conjunción Republicano-Socialista (Republican and Socialist coalition). From 1914 to 1916, it broke with the Socialists and entered legislative elections solely alongside other 'national' (non-regionalist) republicans though the electoral failure of 1916 put an end to this bloc. During the final decade of the Restoration, the Radical Republicans continued to possess a modest parliamentary representation, with Lerroux enjoying a certain prestige as the chief figure of Spanish republicanism.

That came to end with Miguel Primo de Rivera's coup in 1923, and the Radical Republicans went underground. As an end to the dictatorship came in sight, the party began to prepare for a return to constitutional normality. In 1926, it initiated the Republican Alliance, an umbrella organisation of various republicans hoping to push for a republican regime once the dictatorship ended. The Alliance excluded the Socialist Party; in 1928, the Radical-Republicans' left wing split to found the Radical Socialist Republican Party, since it was eager to maintain close links with the socialist movement. The three organisations were the main participants in the Provisional Government that formed after the abdication of Alfonso XIII in April 1931.

== Second Republic (1931-1936) ==
The legislative elections of June 1931 returned the PRR as the second-largest parliamentary group, after the Socialists. The Radical Republicans generally supported the original constitutional bill that provided for an integral, unitary state but with allowance for devolved regions. The party, however, greatly diverged from the republican parties to its left on certain constitutional questions, notably over unicameralism, the dissolution of the religions congregations and the legal provisions for the socialisation of property. These disagreements led the two PRR ministers, Lerroux and Martínez Barrios, to quit the Azaña government in December 1931, and the Radical-Republicans would act as the principle opposition group. That de facto placed the party on the centre-right, and it worked alongside the conservative-liberal republican parties of Melquiades Álvarez, Santiago Alba, Ortega y Gasset, and Alcalá Zamora.

After the fall of the Azaña government in September 1933, Lerroux was asked to form a government excluding the Socialist Party and including the centre-left and centre-right republican parties. The government proved unable to command sufficient confidence in the Cortes, with the result that snap elections were held in which the PRR emerged the strongest single group in parliament with 102 deputies. Lerroux again formed a government, this time of the various conservative-liberal centre-right parties, but the composition of the congress was such that he could not govern without either the republican left, few in number and fragmented, or the powerful bloc of the religious right, the CEDA. Over the next year various governments dominated by Radical-Republicans were toppled before the cabinet was finally extended to include the CEDA, a move that prompted the October Rising of 1934.

The increasing preference of Lerroux's wing to cooperate with the religious right over the fellow secular Radicals of the republican left caused concern among many members of the party. A series of concessions to the CEDA led several of the party's most prominent figures to abandon it in protest between October 1933 and October 1934. Most significantly, the schism of April 1934 had the party's second figure, the former interior minister and prime minister Diego Martínez Barrios, led a faction out of the party, taking with him twenty of the PRR's hundred deputies. They would soon merge with the right wing of the old Radical Socialist Republican Party to form the Republican Union. The walkouts left the remainder of the PRR even more inclined to concession with the religious right.

Lerroux's rump PRR remained in government with the conservative-liberals and the CEDA for 1935. The party, already heavily weakened, made increasing policy concessions to the CEDA. It was fatally damaged by the revelations of two corruption scandals, known as the Nombela and Straperlo affairs, in the autumn of 1935. This led to the downfall of Lerroux as premier, though members of the PRR itself remained in the subsequent cabinets headed by two independents considered to be philosophically close to Radical-Republicanism, Joaquin Chapaprieta and Manuel Portela-Valladares.

The party did not recover. In the elections of 1936, it chose to ally for electoral lists with the parties of the religious and monarchist right, and many of its own local branches and voters abandoned it and migrated to other parties believed to better represent the spirit of Radical Republicanism: Portela Valladares's Party of the Democratic Centre on the centre-right, Martinez Barrios's centre-left Republican Union, or Manuel Azaña's left-wing Republican Left. The PRR garnered just 1% of the vote, returning a mere six deputies, and several of them abandoned the party in parliament to instead sit among the Democratic Centre group. When the insurrection of July 1936 broke out, the PRR was proscribed, which brought its 30-year history to an end.

== Election Results ==
Election	Seats	+/-
1907	2 / 404	New
1910	11 / 404	▲9
1914	5 / 408	▼6
1916	5 / 409	No change
1918	2 / 409	▼3
1919	4 / 409	▲2
1920	5 / 409	▲1
1923	4 / 409	▼1
1931	90 / 470	▲86
1933	102 / 473	▲12
1936	5 / 473	▼97

== See also ==
- Second biennium of the Second Spanish Republic

== Bibliography ==
- Alejo Fernández, Francisco; Caballero Oliver, Juan Diego (2003). Cultura andaluza: geografía, historia, arte, literatura, música y cultura popular. MAD-Eduforma. ISBN 978-84-665-2913-6.
- Alvar Ezquerra, Jaime (2003) [2001]. Diccionario de historia de España. Tres Cantos (Madrid): Istmo. ISBN 84-7090-366-7.
- Álvarez Tardío, Manuel (2005). El camino a la democracia en España. 1931 y 1978. Gota a Gota.
- Arcas Cubero, Fernando (1985). El republicanismo malagueño durante la Restauración, 1875-1923. Ayuntamiento de Córdoba.
- Bonet Revés, Carles (2010). La España de los otros españoles. Barcelona: Ed. Planeta.
- Capdeferro, Marcelo (1985). Otra historia de Cataluña. Acervo.
- Casanova, Julián (2007). Josep Fontana y Ramón Villares (ed.). República y Guerra Civil. Historia de España. Vol. 8. Barcelona: Marcial Pons. ISBN 978-84-8432-878-0.
- Checa Godoy, Antonio (1989). Prensa y partidos políticos durante la II República. Universidad de Salamanca. ISBN 84-7481-521-5.
- Garrido Martín, Aurora (1990). Cantabria 1902-1923. Elecciones y partidos políticos. Universidad de Cantabria.
- Gil Pecharromán, Julio (1997). La Segunda República. Esperanzas y frustraciones. Madrid: Historia 16.
- Heywood, Paul (1993) [1990]. El marxismo y el fracaso del socialismo organizado en España, 1879-1936 (in Spanish). Santander: Servicio de Publicaciones de la Universidad de Cantabria. ISBN 84-8102-033-8.
- Juliá, Santos (2009). La Constitución de 1931. Madrid: Iustel. ISBN 978-84-9890-083-5.
- López Castillo, Antonio (2006). El republicanismo de centro. El Partido Republicano Radical de Almería durante la Segunda República (1931-1936). Instituto de Estudios Almerienses.
- Martínez Roda, Federico (1998). Valencia y las Valencias: su historia contemporánea (1800-1975). Fundación Univ. San Pablo.
- Millares Cantero, Agustín (1999). "Los federales y Lerroux (1906-1924)". Vegueta: Anuario de la Facultad de Geografía e Historia (4). ULPGC: 187–210. ISSN 1133-598X.
- Molas, Isidre (2000). Diccionari dels partits polítics de Catalunya: Segle XX. Enciclopèdia Catalana, S.A. ISBN 84-412-0466-7.
- Navarra Ordoño, Andreu (2013). La región sospechosa. La dialéctica hispanocatalana entre 1875 y 1939. Universidad Autónoma de Barcelona. ISBN 978-84-490-2984-4.
- Pabón, Jesús (1999) [1952]. Cambó: 1876-1947. Editorial Alpha. ISBN 84-7225-740-1.
- Sanz Noya, Julián (2009). La construcción de la dictadura franquista en Cantabria. Universidad de Cantabria. ISBN 978-84-8102-486-9.
- Thomas, Hugh (1976). Historia de la Guerra Civil Española. Barcelona: Círculo de Lectores.
- Townson, Nigel (2002). La República que no pudo ser. La política de centro en España (1931-1936). Madrid: Taurus. ISBN 84-306-0487-1.
- Tusell, Javier (1975). La España del siglo XX. Desde Alfonso XIII a la muerte de Carrero Blanco. Dopesa.
- Translated from the Spanish Wikipedia article
