= Francisco Barnés Salinas =

Spanish professor and politician

Francisco José Barnés Salinas

Minister of Public Instruction
- In office 12 June 1933 – 12 September 1933
- Preceded by: Fernando de los Ríos Urruti
- Succeeded by: Domingo Barnés Salinas

Minister of Public Instruction
- In office 15 May 1936 – 19 July 1936
- Preceded by: Marcelino Domingo Sanjuán
- Succeeded by: Marcelino Domingo Sanjuán

Minister of Public Instruction
- In office 19 July 1936 – 4 September 1936
- Preceded by: Marcelino Domingo Sanjuán
- Succeeded by: Jesús Hernández Tomás

Personal details
- Born: 1877 Seville, Spain
- Died: 1947 (aged 69–70) Mexico City, Mexico
- Party: PRRS (1929-1933); PRRSI (1933-1934); IR (1934-1947)
- Occupation: Professor, politician

Francisco José Barnés Salinas (1877–1947) was a Spanish professor and Left Republican politician. He was Minister of Public Instruction and the Arts during the Second Spanish Republic. After the Spanish Civil War (1936–39) he went into exile in Mexico, where he died.

== Early years ==
Francisco Barnés was born in Seville in 1877. He attended secondary school and studied Philosophy and Literature in Seville. In 1900 he was appointed catedrático (professor) by the Institute of Geography and History, and taught at the schools in Pamplona and Ávila. He was attached to the ideals of the Institución Libre de Enseñanza. Barnés married Dorotea González de la Calle, daughter of a well-known professor Urbano González Serrano. They had several children, of whom the youngest were Angelita and Juan. In 1920 Francisco Barnés joined the Instituto-Escuela, where he taught until 1936 when the institute was closed due to the Spanish Civil War (1936–39). He implemented various pedagogical innovations at the institute.

== Political career ==
Barnés was active in the Republican Left party. When the Second Spanish Republic was proclaimed he was a deputy in the 1931 Constituent Assembly. He was appointed a member of the Board of Trustees of the Institución Libre de Enseñanza by ministerial order on 6 August 1931. Manuel Bartolomé Cossío was president. The board selected young teachers to undertake educational missions in the most remote and isolated villages of Spain. They were carefully selected for their ability to create relaxed and friendly but serious relationships with the villagers, to avoid shocking them in any way while introducing them to modern culture.

Barnés was appointed Minister of Public Instruction in the government of Manuel Azaña in June 1933. Barnés was Minister of Public Instruction from 12 June 1933 to 12 September 1933. He succeeded Fernando de los Ríos Urruti and was succeeded by his brother, Domingo Barnés Salinas. While Minister in 1933 he and his successors, his brother Domingo Barnés and then José Pareja Yébenes, were responsible for formulating the law that excluded religious organizations from teaching, and created secular public schools to replace the religious schools. This was enshrined in the constitution.

Barnés was again appointed Minister of Public Instruction in the government of Santiago Casares Quiroga in May 1936 and of José Giral in June 1936. Until this last appointment he continued to teach at the Instituto-Escuela. He replaced Marcelino Domingo Sanjuán as Minister of Public Instruction on 15 May 1936. For one day on 19 July 1936 at the outbreak of the civil war he was replaced by Domingo Sanjuán, then returned to office, which he held until 4 September 1936. He was replaced by Jesús Hernández Tomás. Hernández Tomás was a militant communist who launched reforms that treated education as a social function.

== Later career ==
After leaving office in September 1936 Barnés generally avoided political office from fear of the safety of his wife and son, who had stayed in Ávila in the rebel zone when the civil war broke out. He accepted the position of inspector of the war front after the death in battle of his youngest son, Juan. He undertook some diplomatic missions for the government. He was appointed consul in Algiers in August 1937, and then consul in Gibraltar a year later. The damaged Republican destroyer José Luis Díez took refuge in Gibraltar in late August 1938. Barnés had difficulty obtaining permission from the British authorities for the sailors to disembark, which was only allowed under tight restrictions, and repairs had to be made clandestinely. The ship made an attempt to escape on 31 December 1938, then was interned at Gibraltar for the duration of the war.

After the civil war Barnés sailed from France to Mexico in the Nyassa. While in exile he became a professor at El Colegio de México. He helped create the Chapultepec Museum in Mexico City. Francisco Barnés Salinas died in Mexico City in 1947.

== Sources ==
- Alberca, Julio Ponce (2014-11-20). Gibraltar and the Spanish Civil War, 1936-39: Local, National and International Perspectives. Bloomsbury Publishing. ISBN 978-1-4725-3108-7.
- Bolado Somolinos, Jose Manuel (1975). "Del Ministerio de Instrucción Pública y Bellas Artes a la Cartera de Educación, Cultura y Deporte. 100 Minostros para un centenario.". Revista de educación (in Spanish). Ministerio de Educación. ISSN 0034-8082.
- Braster, Sjaak; Simon, Frank; Grosvenor, Ian (2014-10-20). A History of Popular Education: Educating the People of the World. Routledge. ISBN 978-1-317-84995-7.
- Martínez Alfaro, Encarnación (2011). "Francisco Barnés en la memoria de sus antiguos alumnos" (PDF). CEE Participación Educativa, número extraordinario (in Spanish).
- Zulueta, Carmen de (2000). La España que pudo ser: memorias de una institucionista republicana. EDITUM. ISBN 978-84-8371-157-6.
