= Results breakdown of the 1936 Spanish general election =

1936 Spanish general election
- 16 February 1936 (first round); 4 March 1936 (second round); 3 May 1936 (second round, partial re-run)

All 473 seats of the Congress of Deputies 237 seats needed for a majority
- Turnout: 72.95%
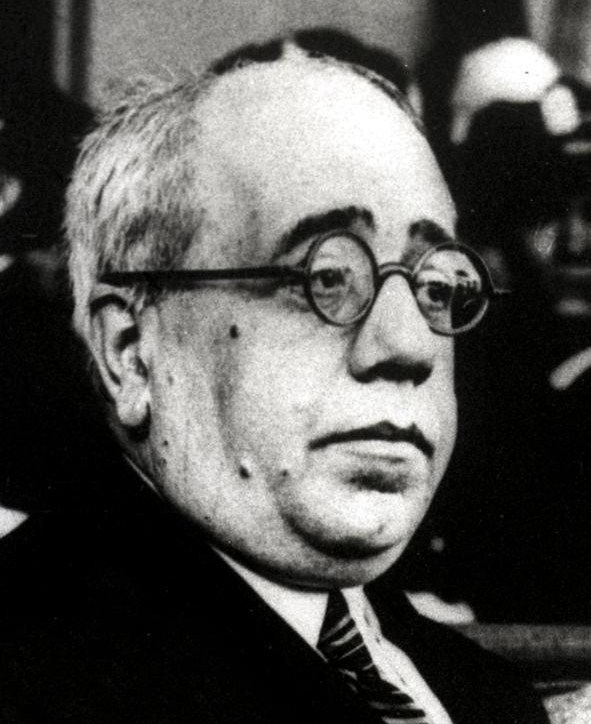

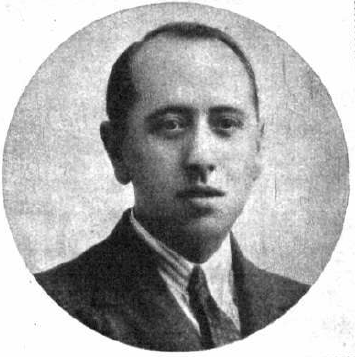

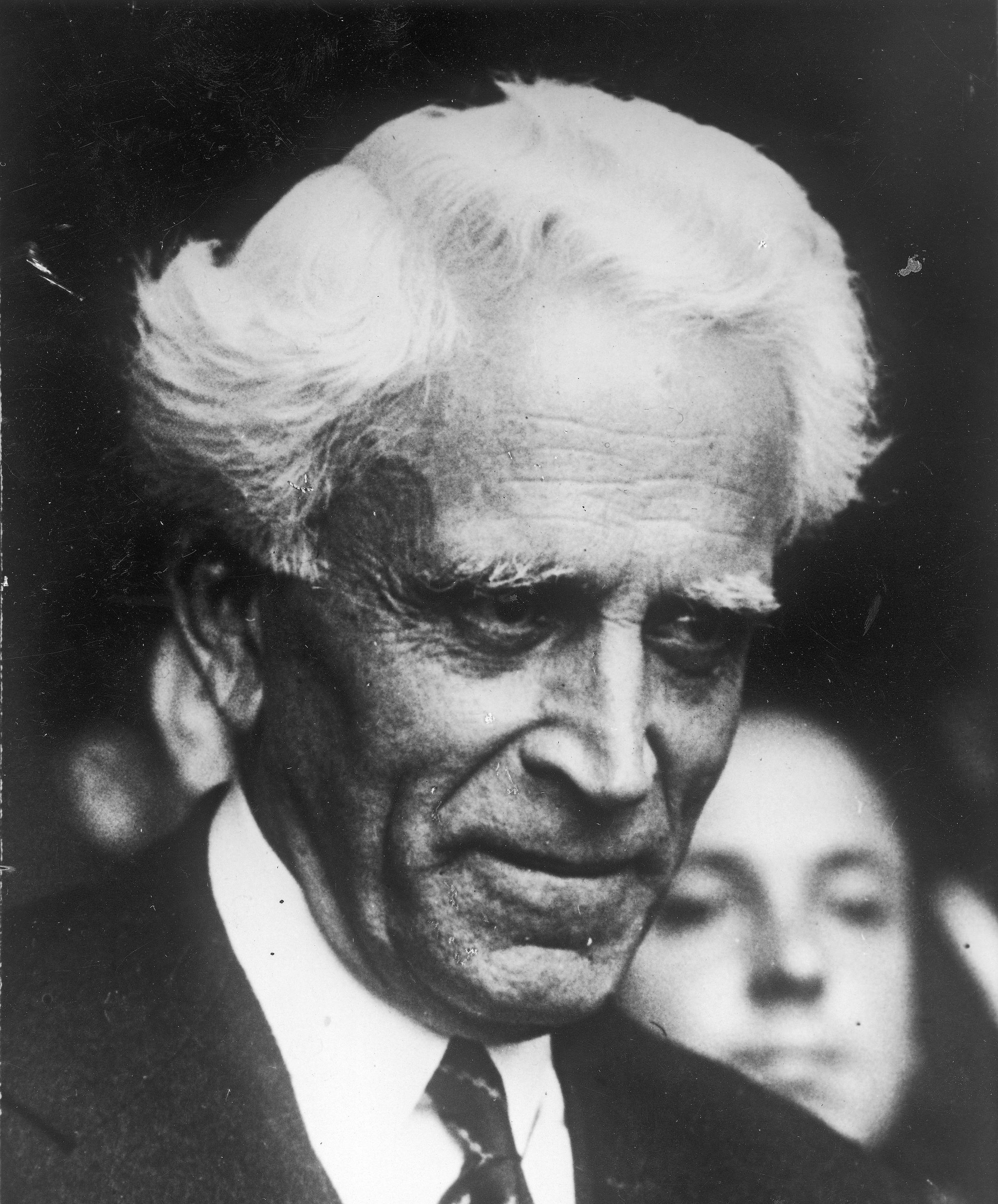
	First party	Second party	Third party
Leader	Manuel Azaña	José María Gil-Robles	Manuel Portela
Party	Popular Front (Note: In every constituency except Lugo)	National Contrarrevolutionary Front (Note: proposed coalition, only materialised on 30 constituencies)	Centre Alliance (Note: Only presented itself on 16 constituencies)
Leader's seat	Madrid-capital	Salamanca and Madrid-capital	Pontevedra
Seats won	283	167	16
Prime Minister before election
Manuel Portela Valladares (acting)
PCD
Prime Minister after election
Manuel Azaña
IR

This is the results breakdown of the election to the Cortes Generales held in Spain on 16 February 1936, with the second round being held on 1 March 1936 and repetitions being held in Cuenca and Granada 3 May 1936. The following tables shows the detailed results in each of the 60 constituencies.

== Electoral system ==
Spain had been divided on several multi-member constituencies based on its 50 provinces with large cities becoming constituencies, as well as Ceuta and Melilla, making a total of 58 constituencies. The votes each voter was entitled to cast were 75–80% of the seats at stake in the constituency. For a candidate to be elected in the first round of voting he needed, at least, 20% of votes cast. If this was not achieved, vacant seats were filled through a second round.

The new electoral law approved on July 27, 1933, introduced some changes compared to the one applied in the previous elections of June 1931: if no candidate achieved 40% of the votes on the first round then no candidate would be elected, while in the second round, only those who had reached 8% of the votes could participate. It also suppressed the constituencies of the cities of Granada, Cordoba and Cartagena by raising the amount of inhabitants needed for a city to become a constituency.

As a result of the aforementioned allocation, each Congress multi-member constituency was entitled the following seats:

Seats	Constituencies
19	Barcelona (city)
17	Madrid (city), La Coruña, Oviedo
15	Barcelona (Province)
14	Badajoz
13	Pontevedra, Valencia (Province), Córdoba, Jaén, Granada
10	Lugo, Toledo, Ciudad Real, Seville (Province)
9	Cáceres, Orense, León, Murcia (Province)
8	Madrid (Province), Málaga (Province)
7	Burgos, Santander, Salamanca, Navarre, Zaragoza (Province), Gerona, Tarragona, Baleares, Valencia (City), Albacete, Huelva, Almería
6	Zamora, Valladolid, Bilbao, Guipúzcoa, Lérida, Castellón, Cuenca, Seville (City), Santa Cruz de Tenerife
5	Ávila, Huesca, Teruel, Las Palmas
4	Málaga (City), Segovia, Palencia, Logroño, Zaragoza (City), Murcia (City), Guadalajara
3	Soria, Vizcaya (Province)
2	Álava
1	Ceuta, Melilla

== Nationwide ==
Seat distribution in the Congress of Deputies
Electoral List	Political Party	Seats
Popular Front	Spanish Socialist Workers' Party (PSOE)	96 / 473
Popular Front	Republican Left (IR)	80 / 473
Popular Front	Republican Union (UR)	37 / 473
Popular Front	Communist Party of Spain (PCE)	16 / 473
Popular Front	Galicianist Party (PG)	3 / 473
Popular Front	Federal Democratic Republican Party (PRDF)	2 / 473
Popular Front	Syndicalist Party (PSind)	1 / 473
Popular Front	Valencian Left (EV)	1 / 473
Popular Front	Galician Agrarian Party	1 / 473
Popular Front	Independent Leftist Republican	3 / 473
Popular Front	Independent Socialist	1 / 473
Popular Front	Independent Sindicalist	1 / 473
Left Front	Republican Left of Catalonia (ERC)	21 / 473
Left Front	Catalan Republican Action (ACR)	5 / 473
Left Front	Socialist Union of Catalonia (USC)	4 / 473
Left Front	Republican Left (IR)	3 / 473
Left Front	Nationalist Party of the Republican Left (PNRE)	2 / 473
Left Front	Unió de Rabassaires (UdR)	2 / 473
Left Front	Spanish Socialist Workers' Party (PSOE)	1 / 473
Left Front	Communist Party of Spain (PCE)	1 / 473
Left Front	Catalan Proletarian Party (PCP)	1 / 473
Left Front	Workers' Party of Marxist Unification (POUM)	1 / 473
Total Left		283 / 473
Centre-Left Coalition	Party of the Democratic Centre (PCD)	4 / 473
Centre-Left Coalition	Republican Left (IR)	2 / 473
Centre-Left Coalition	Republican Union (UR)	1 / 473
Centre-Left Coalition	Spanish Agrarian Party (PAE)	1 / 473
Portela-led Coalition	Party of the Democratic Centre (PCD)	2 / 473
Portela-led Coalition	Spanish Agrarian Party (PAE)	1 / 473
Other Centrist Lists	Conservative Republican Party (PRC)	2 / 473
Other Centrist Lists	Radical Republican Party (PRR)	1 / 473
Basque Nationalist	Basque Nationalist Party (PNV)	9 / 473
Total Centre and PNV		23 / 473
CEDA-led Centre-Right Coalition	Spanish Confederation of Autonomous Right-Wing Groups (CEDA)	29 / 473
CEDA-led Centre-Right Coalition	Party of the Democratic Centre (PCD)	8 / 473
CEDA-led Centre-Right Coalition	Spanish Agrarian Party (PAE)	7 / 473
CEDA-led Centre-Right Coalition	Progressive Republican Party (PRP)	6 / 473
CEDA-led Centre-Right Coalition	Radical Republican Party (PRR)	4 / 473
CEDA-led Centre-Right Coalition	Spanish Renewal (RE)	3 / 473
CEDA-led Centre-Right Coalition	Liberal Democratic Republican Party (PRLD)	2 / 473
CEDA-led Centre-Right Coalition	Conservative Republican Party (PRC)	1 / 473
CEDA-led Centre-Right Coalition	Independent Republican Party (PRI)	1 / 473
CEDA-led Centre-Right Coalition	Mesocrat Party	1 / 473
CEDA-led Centre-Right Coalition	Independent Republican	3 / 473
CEDA-led Centre-Right Coalition	Independent Rightist	1 / 473
CEDA-led Right-Wing Coalition	Spanish Confederation of Autonomous Right-Wing Groups (CEDA)	58 / 473
CEDA-led Right-Wing Coalition	Spanish Renewal (RE)	8 / 473
CEDA-led Right-Wing Coalition	Traditionalist Communion (CT)	8 / 473
CEDA-led Right-Wing Coalition	Spanish Agrarian Party (PAE)	4 / 473
CEDA-led Right-Wing Coalition	Independents from the Centre Republican Party	3 / 473
CEDA-led Right-Wing Coalition	Regionalist Party of Mallorca (PRMall)	1 / 473
CEDA-led Right-Wing Coalition	Spanish Nationalist Party (PNE)	1 / 473
CEDA-led Right-Wing Coalition	Independent Monarchists	2 / 473
CEDA-led Right-Wing Coalition	Independent Rightist	2 / 473
Front Català d'Ordre	Regionalist League (Lliga)	12 / 473
Front Català d'Ordre	Traditionalist Communion (CT)	1 / 473
Other Right-Wing List	Traditionalist Communion (CT)	1 / 473
Total Right-Wing		167 / 473

== Galicia ==
Seat distribution in the Congress of Deputies
Electoral List	Political Party	Seats
Popular Front	Republican Left (IR)	10 / 49
Popular Front	Spanish Socialist Workers' Party (PSOE)	5 / 49
Popular Front	Republican Union (UR)	4 / 49
Popular Front	Galicianist Party (PG)	3 / 49
Popular Front	Communist Party of Spain (PCE)	1 / 49
Popular Front	Galician Agrarian	1 / 49
Popular Front	Independent Socialist	1 / 49
Total Popular Front		25 / 49
Centre-Left Coalition	Party of the Democratic Centre (PCD)	4 / 49
Centre-Left Coalition	Republican Left (IR)	2 / 49
Centre-Left Coalition	Republican Union (UR)	1 / 49
Centre-Left Coalition	Spanish Agrarian Party (PAE)	1 / 49
Portela-led Coalition	Party of the Democratic Centre (PCD)	1 / 49
Portela-led Coalition	Spanish Agrarian Party (PAE)	1 / 49
Total Centre		10 / 49
CEDA-led Centre-Right Coalition	Spanish Confederation of Autonomous Right-Wing Groups (CEDA)	5 / 49
CEDA-led Centre-Right Coalition	Spanish Renewal (RE)	1 / 49
CEDA-led Centre-Right Coalition	Conservative Republican Party (PRC)	1 / 49
CEDA-led Centre-Right Coalition	Independent Republican	1 / 49
CEDA-led Right-Wing Coalition	Spanish Confederation of Autonomous Right-Wing Groups (CEDA)	3 / 49
CEDA-led Right-Wing Coalition	Spanish Renewal (RE)	3 / 49
Total Right-Wing		14 / 49

=== La Coruña ===
17 seats, 13 votes per citizen

Alliance	Party	Candidate	Votes
Popular Front	IR	Emilio González López	169,628
Popular Front	UR	José Miñones Bernárdez	153,867
Popular Front	IR	José Calviño Domínguez	153,473
Popular Front	IR/PG	Ramón Suárez Picallo	153,145
Popular Front	IR	Santiago Casares Quiroga	151,523
Popular Front	PSOE	Ramón Beade Méndez	148,669
Popular Front	IR	Manuel Guzmán García	145,249
Popular Front	PG	Antón Vilar Ponte	145,009
Popular Front	UR	José García-Ramos y Segond	144,923
Popular Front	IR	Alfredo Somoza Gutiérrez	143,720
Popular Front	IR	Victorino Veiga González	142,614
Popular Front	PSOE	Edmundo Lorenzo Santiago	141,944
Popular Front	Ind/PSOE	Pedro Longueira Patiño	139,996
Counter-revolutionary List	CEDA	Benito Blanco Rajoy Espada	127,008
Counter-revolutionary List	CEDA	Felipe Gil Casares	124,189
Counter-revolutionary List	Ind	Luis Cornide Quiroga	124,168
Counter-revolutionary List	CEDA	José Mº Méndez Gil-Bradón	123,220
Counter-revolutionary List	CEDA	Eugenio Vázquez Gundin	121,945
Counter-revolutionary List	CEDA	Antolín Sánchez Valeiro	120,379
Counter-revolutionary List	Ind	Eduardo O'Shea	120,505
Counter-revolutionary List	RE	José María Parames y García Barrios	119,029
Counter-revolutionary List	CEDA	Fernando Pérez Barreiro	117,474
Counter-revolutionary List	Ind	José del Moral Sanjurjo	116,074
Counter-revolutionary List	PRC	José Reino Caamaño	109,547
Counter-revolutionary List	RE	Juan Gil Armada	103,283
Counter-revolutionary List	PRR	Gerardo Abad Conde	72,278
Centrists	PCD	Manuel Iglesias Corral	65,970
Centrists	Ind	Antonio Rodríguez Pérez	61,474
Centrists	PCD	Víctor Manuel Becerra Herráiz	55,363
Centrists	PCD	Leandro Pita Romero	54,083
Centrists	PCD	Antonio Carballo Fernández	41,518
Centrists	PCD	Raimundo López Pol	24,053
Centrists	PCD	Laureano Santiso Girón	17,461
Independent Monarchist	Ind/RE	Dámaso Calvo Moreiras	23,267
Falangist	FE-JONS	Manuel López Sendón	18,704
-	Ind	Emilio Pita Álvarez	334
-	Ind	Diego Fernández Gómez	222
-	Ind	José López Bouza	134
-	Ind	José Búa Carou	94
-	Ind	Olegario Campos Canoura	75
-	Ind	Segundo Cotovad Díaz	18
Others			600

=== Pontevedra ===
Only the results from the elected candidates are complete, the results for the other candidates corresponds to largely incomplete (~40% missing) results published on 19 February 1936

13 seats, 10 votes per citizen

Alliance	Party	Candidate	Votes
Popular Front	PG	Alfonso Daniel Rodríguez Castelao	103,436
Popular Front	IR	Bibiano Fernández Osorio Tafall	102,234
Popular Front	IR	Elpidio Villaverde Rey	98,313
Popular Front	IR	Alejandro Viana Esperón	87,939
Popular Front	UR	Celestino Poza Cobas	86,528
Popular Front	Galician Agrarian (Note: Unrelated to the national PAE)	Antonio Alonso Ríos	86,114
Popular Front	PSOE	Amando Guiance Pampín	84,339
Popular Front	PSOE	Antonino Bilbatúa Zubeldía	82,024
Popular Front	PCE	Adriano Romero Cachinero	81,905
Popular Front	PSOE	Ignacio Seoane Fernández	80,019
Counter-revolutionary list	RE	Victor Lis Quiben	71,321
Counter-revolutionary list	CEDA	Severino Barros de Lis	64,685
Counter-revolutionary list	CEDA	Nicasio Guisasola	48,848
Counter-revolutionary list	CEDA	Celso Méndez Saavedra	43,919
Counter-revolutionary list	CEDA	Manuel Casqueiro Paz	43,041
Counter-revolutionary list	CEDA	Pascual Díez de Rivera	45,012
Counter-revolutionary list	PRR	Emiliano Iglesias	46,322
Counter-revolutionary list	PRR	Vicente Sierra Martínez	42,421
Counter-revolutionary list	PRR	Julio Otero Mirellis	39,587
Counter-revolutionary list	RE	Wenceslao González Garra	42,173
Centrists	PCD	Manuel Portela Valladares	70,350
Centrists	PCD	Prudencio Landín Tobio	18,080
Centrists	PCD	Ramón Salgado Pérez	19,391
Centrists	PCD	Valentín Paz Andrade	16,640
Centrists	PCD	José López Varela	17,265
Centrists	PCD	Alejandro Mon y Landa	22,227
Centrists	PCD	Jesús Garrido Ramos	11,927
Centrists	PCD	Jesús María Santaló Ponte	15,858
Centrists	PCD	Pedro Varela Castro	19,961
Conservative	PRC	Julia Becerra Malvar	Retired

=== Lugo ===
10 seats, 8 votes per citizen

Alliance	Party	Candidate	Votes
Republican Coalition	PCD	Manuel Becerra Fernández	98,715
Republican Coalition	IR	Roberto Ouro Vázquez	94,029
Republican Coalition	IR	José Mº Díaz Villamil	92,786
Republican Coalition	PCD	Armando Peñamaría Álvarez	91,997
Republican Coalition	PCD	Virgilio Fernández de la Vega	88,507
Republican Coalition	UR	Ricardo Gasset Alzugaray	87,116
Republican Coalition	PCD	Ramón Fernández Mato	86,782
Republican Coalition	PAE	Luís Rodríguez de Viguri	76,925
Right-Wing Coalition	CEDA	José Benito Pardo y Pardo	87,401
Right-Wing Coalition	PRC	Enrique Gómez Jiménez	82,579
Right-Wing Coalition	RE	José Soto Reguera	76,828
Right-Wing Coalition	CEDA	José María Pérez Laborda	72,594
Right-Wing Coalition	CEDA	Manuel Saco Rivera	75,807
Right-Wing Coalition	CEDA	Ramón Neira Pedrosa	72,076
Right-Wing Coalition	PAE	Felipe Lazcano Morales	75,002
Right-Wing Coalition	Ind (Note: Republican)	Gumersindo Rico González	74,244
Independent Rightist List	Ind	Ángel López Pérez	33,304
Independent Rightist List	Ind	Isauro Pardo y Pardo	14,570
Socialists	PSOE	Juan Tizón Herreros	7,065
Socialists	PSOE	Isauro Pardo y Pardo	5,226
Socialists	PSOE	Jacinto Calvo López	2,780
Galicianist	PG	Gerardo Álvarez Gallego	4,991

=== Orense ===
9 seats, 7 votes per citizen Only the results from the elected candidates are complete, the results for the other candidates corresponds to largely incomplete (~9% missing) results published on 19 February 1936

Alliance	Party	Candidate	Votes
Female and Popular Action	RE	José Sabucedo Morales	91,768
Female and Popular Action	CEDA	Laureano Peláez Canellas	88,303
Female and Popular Action	CEDA	Luis Espada Guntín	88,043
Female and Popular Action	RE	José Calvo Sotelo	83,504
Female and Popular Action	CEDA	Ramón Villarino de Saa	82,814
Female and Popular Action	RE	Andrés Amado y Reygondaud	82,609
Female and Popular Action	CT	Ramón Delage Santos	21,685
Centrist	PAE	Antonio Taboada Tundidor	80,664
Centrist	PCD	Fernando Ramos Cerviño (Note: On March 2, their election is anulled by the electoral commission and proclaims Manuel Martínez Risco and Alfonso Pazos Cid as members of the Cortes in their place)	72,126
Centrist	PCD	Bernardo Castro Fernández	44,960
Centrist	PCD	Luis Fábregas Santamaría	41,415
Centrist	PAE	Ramón Varela Fernández	33,601
Centrist	PCD	Benito Luis Lorenzo	26,825
Centrist	PCD	Basilio Álvarez Rodríguez	21,892
Radical	Ind	Justo Villanueva Gómez	63,128
Radical	PRR	Felisindo Menor Quintas	>26,000
Radical	PRR	Emilio Novoa González	11,688
Radical	PRR	Luis Usera Bugallal	10,502
Radical	PRR	Leandro Garnelo Fernández	1,609
Popular Front	UR	Alfonso Pazos Cid	49,268
Popular Front	IR	Manuel Martínez Risco y Macías	39,503
Popular Front	PSOE	Manuel Suárez Castro	30,982
Popular Front	IR	Manuel García Becerra	20,225
Popular Front	PG	Alejandro Bóveda Iglesias	19,393
Popular Front	PSOE	Ramón Fuentes	18,695
Popular Front	PCE	Benigno Álvarez	17,262

== Asturias and the Region of León ==
Seat distribution in the Congress of Deputies
Electoral List	Political Party	Seats
Popular Front	Spanish Socialist Workers' Party (PSOE)	9 / 39
Popular Front	Republican Left (IR)	7 / 39
Popular Front	Communist Party of Spain (PCE)	2 / 39
Popular Front	Republican Union (UR)	1 / 39
Popular Front	Independent Republican	1 / 39
Total Popular Front		20 / 39
Portela-led Coalition	Party of the Democratic Centre (PCD)	1 / 39
Total Centre		1 / 39
CEDA-led Centre-Right Coalition	Spanish Confederation of Autonomous Right-Wing Groups (CEDA)	3 / 39
CEDA-led Centre-Right Coalition	Liberal Democratic Republican Party (PRLD)	2 / 39
CEDA-led Centre-Right Coalition	Spanish Agrarian Party (PAE)	2 / 39
CEDA-led Centre-Right Coalition	Radical Republican Party (PRR)	1 / 39
CEDA-led Right-Wing Coalition	Spanish Confederation of Autonomous Right-Wing Groups (CEDA)	7 / 39
CEDA-led Right-Wing Coalition	Spanish Agrarian Party (PAE)	2 / 39
CEDA-led Right-Wing Coalition	Spanish Renewal (RE)	1 / 39
Total Right-Wing		18 / 39

=== Oviedo ===
17 seats, 13 votes per citizen

Alliance	Party	Candidate	Votes
Popular Front	Ind/Rep	Álvaro de Albornoz Liminiana	171,241
Popular Front	IR	Ángel Menéndez Suárez	171,115
Popular Front	IR	Luis Laredo Vega	171,089
Popular Front	IR	Félix Fernández Vega	170,982
Popular Front	IR	José Maldonado González	170,904
Popular Front	PSOE	Mariano Moreno Mateo	170,852
Popular Front	PSOE	Inocencio Burgos Riestra	170,841
Popular Front	PSOE	Amador Fernández Montes	170,739
Popular Front	PSOE	Belarmino Tomás Álvarez	170,720
Popular Front	PSOE	Matilde de la Torre Gutiérrez	170,663
Popular Front	PSOE	Graciano Antuña Álvarez	170,502
Popular Front	PCE	Dolores Ibárruri Gómez	170,497
Popular Front	PCE	Juan José Manso del Abad	170,420
Counter-Revolutionary List	CEDA	José María Fernández Ladreda	151,480
Counter-Revolutionary List	CEDA	José María Moutas Meras (Note: On March 20, their election is anulled by the electoral commission and proclaims Ramón Álvarez Valdes, Pedro Miñor Rivas and Bernardo Aza González as members of the Cortes in their place)	151,254
Counter-Revolutionary List	PRLD	Melquíades Álvarez y González Posada	151,110
Counter-Revolutionary List	CEDA	Romualdo Alvargonzález Lanquínez	151,002
Counter-Revolutionary List	PRLD	Ramón Álvarez Valdés y Castañón	150,988
Counter-Revolutionary List	CEDA	Gonzalo Merás Navia	150,987
Counter-Revolutionary List	CEDA	Eduardo Piñán Malvar	150,940
Counter-Revolutionary List	Anti-Marxist	Vicente Madera Peña	150,882
Counter-Revolutionary List	PRLD	Alfredo Martínez G. Argüelles	150,843
Counter-Revolutionary List	CEDA	Bernardo Aza y González Escalada	150,793
Counter-Revolutionary List	PRLD	Pedro Miñor Rivas	150,788
Counter-Revolutionary List	PRLD	Manuel Pedregal Fernández	150,773
Counter-Revolutionary List	PRLD	Mariano Merediz y Díaz Parreño	150,742
Spanish Phalanx	FE-JONS	José Antonio Primo de Rivera	815
Spanish Phalanx	FE-JONS	Leopoldo Panizo Piquero	507
Spanish Phalanx	FE-JONS	Manuel Valdés Larrañaga	505
Spanish Phalanx	FE-JONS	Enrique Canga García	463
Spanish Phalanx	FE-JONS	Santiago López Fernández	450
Spanish Phalanx	FE-JONS	José David Montes García	419
Spanish Phalanx	FE-JONS	Juan Francisco Yela Utrilla	233
Spanish Phalanx	FE-JONS	Julio Ruiz de Alda	222
Spanish Phalanx	FE-JONS	Juan Lobo González	211
Spanish Phalanx	FE-JONS	Emilio Alvargonzález Matalobos	211
Spanish Phalanx	FE-JONS	Raimundo Fernández Cuesta	205
Spanish Phalanx	FE-JONS	Benito de la Torre Alonso	203
Spanish Phalanx	FE-JONS	Manuel Mateo Mateo	203
-	Blank votes	Blank votes	49

=== León ===
9 seats, 7 votes per citizen

Alliance	Party	Candidate	Votes
Right-Wing List	CEDA	Pedro Martínez Juárez	90,847
Right-Wing List	CEDA	César Contreras Dueñas	90,310
Right-Wing List	CEDA	Antonio Álvarez Robles	90,164
Right-Wing List	CEDA	Pedro Barrios Caamaño	89,311
Right-Wing List	PAE	Antonio Pérez Crespo	85,789
Right-Wing List	RE	Francisco Roa de la Vega	84,493
Right-Wing List	PAE	Manuel Saénz de Miera y Millán	78,781
Popular Front	UR	Félix Gordón Ordás	72,985
Popular Front	IR	Gabriel Franco López	72,700
Popular Front	IR	Luis López Dóriga	70,588
Popular Front	UR	Ramiro Armesto	70,546
Popular Front	PSOE	Antonio Rodríguez Calleja	67,454
Popular Front	PSOE	Alfredo Nistal Martínez	67,201
Popular Front	PSOE	Francisco Valverde Álvarez	66,942
Centrist	PCD	Juan Castrillo Santos	17,401
Centrist	PCD	Toribio Martínez Cabrera	9,088
Radical	PRR	Herminio Fernández de la Poza	15,623
Radical	PRR	José Perandones Cordero	7,160
-	Ind	José Álvarez Arias	9,192
-	Ind	Valeriano B. Díez	9,192
-	Ind	Mariano C. Berrueta	196
-	Ind	Timoteo Morán	2

=== Zamora ===
6 seats, 4 votes per citizen

Alliance	Party	Candidate	Votes
Counter-Revolutionary Front	PAE	Antonio Rodríguez Cid	69,686
Counter-Revolutionary Front	PAE	José María Cid y Ruiz-Zorrilla	69,250
Counter-Revolutionary Front	CEDA	Geminiano Carrascal Martín	66,965
Counter-Revolutionary Front	PRR	Santiago Alba Bonifaz	65,518
Popular Front	PSOE	Ángel Galarza Gago	35,986
Popular Front	IR	Antonio Moreno Jover	35,288
Popular Front	PSOE	Quirino Salvadores Crespo	35,055
Popular Front	UR	Félix Balbuena Altolazabal	34,211
Monarchist	RE	César Alonso Redoli	20,212
Conservative	PRC	Francisco González García	15,008
-	?	Ismael Rodríguez	3,103
Centrist	PCD	Leopoldo Palacios Merini	1,416
Spanish Phalanx	FE-JONS	César Fernández Meleiro	1,193

=== Salamanca ===
7 seats, 5 votes per citizen

Alliance	Party	Candidate	Votes
Right-Wing List	CEDA	José María Gil-Robles y Quiñones	83,362
Right-Wing List	CEDA	Cándido Casanueva Gorjón	66,841
Right-Wing List	CEDA	Ernesto Castaño Arévalo (Note: On April 2, his ellection is anulled by the electoral commission and proclaims Casto Prieto member of the Cortes in his place)	66,540
Right-Wing List	CEDA	José Cimas Leal	65,841
Right-Wing List	CT	José María Lamamié de Clairac (Note: On April 2, his ellection is anulled by the electoral commission and proclaims Filiberto Villalobos member of the Cortes in his place)	64,906
Right-Wing List	CEDA	Ramón Olleros Gregorio (Note: On April 2, his ellection is anulled by the electoral commission and proclaims Valeriano Casanueva member of the Cortes in his place)	61,715
Popular Front	PSOE	José Andrés Manso	54,432
Popular Front	IR	Casto Prieto Carrasco	48,590
Popular Front	PSOE	Valeriano Casanueva Picazo	46,492
Popular Front	IR	Francisco Ruipérez Cristóbal	46,118
Popular Front	PSOE	Manuel Francisco Crespo	44,391
Centrist	PCD	Filiberto Villalobos González	49,337
Conservative	PRC	Tomás Marco Escribano	21,502
Liberal Democrat	PRLD	Rafael González Cobos	17,069
Monarchist	RE	Diego Martín Veloz	8,021
Municipalist	Ind	Fernando Fernández Suárez	4,784
Agrarian	PAE	Eduardo García Tabernero	853
Progressive	PRP	Julio de Ramón Laca	99
-	Ind	Antonio Pérez Herrasti	52
-	Ind/UR	Cipriano Rodríguez Lavín	23

== Old Castile ==
Seat distribution in the Congress of Deputies
Electoral List	Political Party	Seats
Popular Front	Republican Left (IR)	6 / 40
Popular Front	Spanish Socialist Workers' Party (PSOE)	3 / 40
Popular Front	Republican Union (UR)	2 / 40
Total Popular Front		11 / 40
Other Centrist Lists	Conservative Republican Party (PRC)	2 / 40
Total Centre		2 / 40
CEDA-led Centre-Right Coalition	Spanish Confederation of Autonomous Right-Wing Groups (CEDA)	2 / 40
CEDA-led Centre-Right Coalition	Radical Republican Party (PRR)	1 / 40
CEDA-led Centre-Right Coalition	Spanish Agrarian Party (PAE)	1 / 40
CEDA-led Right-Wing Coalition	Spanish Confederation of Autonomous Right-Wing Groups (CEDA)	15 / 40
CEDA-led Right-Wing Coalition	Spanish Renewal (RE)	4 / 40
CEDA-led Right-Wing Coalition	Traditionalist Communion (CT)	1 / 40
CEDA-led Right-Wing Coalition	Spanish Agrarian Party (PAE)	1 / 40
CEDA-led Right-Wing Coalition	Spanish Nationalist Party (PNE)	1 / 40
CEDA-led Right-Wing Coalition	Independent Rightist	1 / 40
Total Right-Wing		27 / 40

=== Santander ===
7 seats, 5 votes per citizen

Alliance	Party	Candidate	Votes
Counter-Revolutionary Coalition	CEDA	Pablo Ceballos Botín	77,763
Counter-Revolutionary Coalition	RE	Santiago Fuentes Pila	76,206
Counter-Revolutionary Coalition	CEDA	Ricardo Sánchez de Movellán	75,352
Counter-Revolutionary Coalition	CEDA	Eduardo Pérez del Molino	74,000
Counter-Revolutionary Coalition	RE	Pedro Sainz Rodríguez	71,574
Popular Front	PSOE	Bruno Alonso González	61,670
Popular Front	IR	Ramón Ruiz Rebollo	61,086
Popular Front	IR	José Lillo Sanz	60,486
Popular Front	PSOE	Antonio Ramos González	60,446
Popular Front	PSOE	Juan Ruiz Olazarán	60,218
Governmental Centrist	PCD	Alonso Velarde Blanco	15,469
Mountainous Counter-Revolutionary	CT	José Luis Zamanillo	11,735
Radical	PRR	Eduardo Benzo Cano	9,495
Radical	PRR	Julio Arce Alonso	9,250
Agrarian	PAE	Victoriano Sánchez y Sánchez	5,451
Spanish Phalanx	FE-JONS	José Ruiz de Alda	2,930

=== Palencia ===
4 seats, 3 votes per citizen

Alliance	Party	Candidate	Votes
Counter-Revolutionary Front	CEDA	Ricardo Cortés Villasana	51,372
Counter-Revolutionary Front	Ind	Abilio Calderón Rojo	49,804
Counter-Revolutionary Front	CEDA	Juan Bautista Guerra García	49,133
Counter-Revolutionary Front	RE	Fernando Suárez de Tangil	48,534
Popular Front	PSOE	Crescenciano Aguado Rojo	24,937
Popular Front	UR	Antonio Pérez de la Fuente	24,788
Popular Front	IR	Matías Peñalba y Alonso de Ojeda	24,515

=== Burgos ===
7 seats, 5 votes per citizen

Alliance	Party	Candidate	Votes
Counter-Revolutionary Front	CEDA	Julio Gonzalo Soto	70,993
Counter-Revolutionary Front	CEDA	Manuel Bermejillo Martínez	70,258
Counter-Revolutionary Front	CT	Francisco Estévanez Rodríguez (Note: On March 24, his ellection is anulled by the electoral commission and proclaims Eliseo Cuadrao member of the Cortes in his place)	66,324
Counter-Revolutionary Front	CT	José María Valiente Soriano	64,986
Counter-Revolutionary Front	PNE	José María Albiñana	64,982
Popular Front	IR	Moíses Barrio Duque	39,032
Popular Front	PSOE	Luis Labín Besuita	34,478
Popular Front	IR	Eliseo Cuadrao García	33,678
Popular Front	PSOE	Máximo Asenjo Areizaga	32,134
Popular Front	IR	José Mingo Escolar	32,093
Agrarian	PAE	Ángel García Vedoya	32,010
Agrarian	PAE	José Martínez de Velasco	31,383
Agrarian	PAE	Ramón de la Cuesta Cobo	30,250
Agrarian	PAE	Tomás Alonso de Armiño Calleja	23,168
Agrarian	PAE	Aurelio Gómez González	18,662
Radical	PRR	Juan Antonio Gutiérrez Moliner	24,249

=== Logroño ===
4 seats, 3 votes per citizen

Alliance	Party	Candidate	Votes
Riojan Action	CEDA	Ángeles Gil Albarellos	45,761
Riojan Action	CEDA	Tomás Ortiz de Solórzano	45,755
Riojan Action	CEDA	Antonio Arnedo Monguilán	39,716
Popular Front	IR	Amós Salvador Sáenz	37,308
Popular Front	PSOE	Amós Sabrás Gurrea	36,468
Popular Front	IR	Jacinto Ramos Herrea	35,729
Catholic-Monarchist (Note: They asked voters to "vote for our candidate with two others from Riojan Action")	CT	Romualdo de Toledo y Robles	9,442
Centrist Radical Republican List	PRR	Alejandro Manzanares Beriaín	990

=== Valladolid ===
Only the results from the elected candidates are complete, the results for the other candidates corresponds to largely incomplete (~4% missing) results published on 20 February 1936

6 seats, 4 votes per citizen

Alliance	Party	Candidate	Votes
Right-Wing List	CEDA	Amando Valentín Aguilar	68,226
Right-Wing List	CEDA	Luciano de la Calzada Rodríguez	67,234
Right-Wing List	CEDA	Germán Adánez Horcajuelo	66,256
Right-Wing List	RE	Juan Antonio Gamazo Abarca	65,614
Popular Front	IR	Isidoro Vergara Castrillón	49,177
Popular Front	PSOE	Federico Landrove López	48,698
Popular Front	PSOE	Eusebio González Suárez	46,381
Popular Front	UR	Álvaro Díaz Quiñones	46,294
Radical	PRR	Joaquín Mª Álvarez-Martín y Taladriz	25,062
Agrarian	PAE	Juan Antonio Llorente García	9,515
Spanish Phalanx	FE-JONS	Onésimo Redondo Ortega	5,017
Spanish Phalanx	FE-JONS	José Antonio Primo de Rivera	2,704

=== Ávila ===
5 seats, 4 votes per citizen

Alliance	Party	Candidate	Votes
Counter-Revolutionary Right-Wing List	CEDA	Benito Dávila Sánchez Monge	48,364
Counter-Revolutionary Right-Wing List	CEDA	Salvador Represa Marazuela	47,523
Counter-Revolutionary Right-Wing List	PRR	José Picón Meilhón	45,528
Counter-Revolutionary Right-Wing List	PAE	Nicasio Velayos y Velayos	42,237
Popular Front	IR	Claudio Sánchez Albornoz	43,263
Popular Front	UR	Francisco Agustín Rodríguez	40,083
Popular Front	IR	Tomás Rodríguez González Cabrera	39,402
Popular Front	PSOE	José Felipe García Muro	37,794
Monarchist	RE	José Yanguas Messía	23,624
Governmental Centrist List	PRP	José Palmerino San Román Colino	14,998

=== Segovia ===
4 seats, 3 votes per citizen

Alliance	Party	Candidate	Votes
Counter-Revolutionary List	CEDA	Manuel Giménez Fernández	38,640
Counter-Revolutionary List	CEDA	Juan de Contreras y López de Ayala	38,041
Counter-Revolutionary List	PAE	Rufino Cano de Rueda	29,864
Popular Front	UR	Arturo Martín de Nicolás y García	25,853
Popular Front	IR	Francisco Martín de Antonio	24,880
Popular Front	PSOE	Modesto Arranz Velasco	19,452
Centrists	PCD	Hipólito González Parrado	12,857
Centrists	PCD	Miguel González Arranz	2,120
Centrists	PCD	José Zubizarreta Gutiérrez	1,978
Independent Republican	Ind	Eutiquiano Rebollar Rodríguez	11,578
Independent Republican	Ind	Jerónimo García Gallego	9,602
Radical	PRR	José María Codina Ruiz	3,819
Progressive	PRP	Wenceslao Delgado García	997

=== Soria ===
3 seats, 2 votes per citizen

1º round

Alliance	Party	Candidate	Votes
CEDA	CEDA	Ricardo Moreno Navarrete	22,680
CEDA	CEDA	Julián Pascual Dodero	24,539
Conservative Republican	PRC	Gregorio Arranz Olalla	23,845
Conservative Republican	PRC	Miguel Maura Gamazo	21,783
Popular Front	UR	Benito Artigas Arpón	21,167
Popular Front	PSOE	Carlos García Benito	18,429

2º round

Alliance	Party	Candidate	Votes
Conservative Republican	PRC	Miguel Maura Gamazo	24,346
Conservative Republican	PRC	Gregorio Arranz Olalla	23,561
Popular Front	UR	Benito Artigas Arpón	24,305
Popular Front	PSOE	Carlos García Benito	21,328
CEDA	CEDA	Julián Pascual Dodero	21,131
CEDA	CEDA	Ricardo Moreno Navarrete	18,002

== Vascongadas and Navarre ==
Seat distribution in the Congress of Deputies
Electoral List	Political Party	Seats
Popular Front	Spanish Socialist Workers' Party (PSOE)	3 / 24
Popular Front	Republican Left (IR)	3 / 24
Popular Front	Communist Party of Spain (PCE)	1 / 24
Total Popular Front		7 / 24
Basque Nationalist	Basque Nationalist Party (PNV)	9 / 24
Total PNV		9 / 24
CEDA-led Right-Wing Coalition	Traditionalist Communion (CT)	4 / 24
CEDA-led Right-Wing Coalition	Spanish Confederation of Autonomous Right-Wing Groups (CEDA)	2 / 24
CEDA-led Right-Wing Coalition	Independent Rightist	1 / 24
Other Right-Wing List	Traditionalist Communion (CT)	1 / 24
Total Right-Wing		8 / 24

=== Bilbao ===
6 seats, 4 votes per citizen

Alliance	Party	Candidate	Votes
Popular Front	IR	Mariano Ruiz Funes García	69,240
Popular Front	PSOE	Julián Zugazagoitia Mendieta	69,062
Popular Front	PSOE	Indalecio Prieto Tuero	68,913
Popular Front	PCE	Leandro Carro Hernaez	68,837
Nationalists	PNV	José Horn Areilza	43,223
Nationalists	PNV	Manuel Robles Aranguiz	43,099
Nationalists	PNV	José Mª Izaurieta Echevarria	42,897
Nationalists	PNV	Francisco Arregui Fernández	42,707
Counter-Revolutionary Block	Ind Monarchist	Joaquín Adán Satué	30,209
Counter-Revolutionary Block	CEDA	Miguel Goldaracena Goya	30,049
Counter-Revolutionary Block	CT	José Mª Juaristi Landaida	29,960
Counter-Revolutionary Block	RE	José Mª Areilza Martínez Rodas	29,909
Others			49
Blank ballots			164

=== Vizcaya (Province) ===
3 seats, 2 votes per citizen 1º round

Alliance	Party	Candidate	Votes
Nationalists	PNV	José Antonio Aguirre y Lecube	28,217
Nationalists	PNV	Heliodoro De la Torre y Larrínaga	22,774
Nationalists	PNV	Julio Jáuregui Lasanta	20,134
Counter-Revolutionary Block	CT	José Luis Gaytán de Ayala y Costa	24,248
Counter-Revolutionary Block	RE	Santiago Martínez de las Rivas	21,595
Popular Front	PSOE	Paulino Gómez Beltrán	10,011
Popular Front	UR	Alfredo Espinosa Orive	9,832
Others			170
Blank ballots			94

2º round

Alliance	Party	Candidate	Votes
Nationalists	PNV	Julio Jáuregui Lasanta	25,533
Nationalists	PNV	Heliodoro De la Torre y Larrínaga	25,369
Nationalists	PNV	José Antonio Aguirre y Lecube	25,120
Counter-Revolutionary Block	CT	José Luis Gaytán de Ayala y Costa	21,497
Counter-Revolutionary Block	RE	Santiago Martínez de las Rivas	19,418
Popular Front	PSOE	Paulino Gómez Beltrán	10,011
Popular Front	UR	Alfredo Espinosa Orive	10,491
Others			38
Blank ballots			119

=== Guipuzcoa ===
6 seats, 4 votes per citizen

1º round

Alliance	Party	Candidate	Votes
Counter-Revolutionary Block (Note: The block did not stand in the second round and called on its voters to abstain from voting in it)	CEDA	Juan Pablo Lojendio Irure	43,936
Counter-Revolutionary Block	CT	Ricardo Oreja Elósegui	43,689
Counter-Revolutionary Block	CT	Antonio Paguaga Paguaga	43,656
Counter-Revolutionary Block	RE	José Múgica	43,495
Popular Front	IR	Mariano Ansó Zunzarren	40,595
Popular Front	PSOE	Miguel Amilibia Machimbarrena	40,195
Popular Front	IR	Luis Apraiz González Betolaza	40,129
Popular Front	PCE	Jesús Larrañaga Churruca	39,213
Nationalists	PNV	Manuel de Irujo Ollo	44,053
Nationalists	PNV	Telesforo Monzón Ortiz de Urruela	38,268
Nationalists	PNV	Juan Antonio Irazusta Munoa	38,220
Nationalists	PNV	Rafael Picavea Leguía	37,928
Nationalists	PNV	José María Lasarte Arana	37,178
Blank ballots			121
Others			62

2ºround

Alliance	Party	Candidate	Votes
Nationalists	PNV	José María Lasarte	62,659
Nationalists	PNV	Rafael Picavea Leguía	62,121
Nationalists	PNV	Manuel de Irujo Ollo	62,035
Nationalists	PNV	Juan Antonio Irazusta Munoa	61,862
Popular Front	IR	Mariano Ansó Zunzarren	41,905
Popular Front	PSOE	Miguel Amilibia Machimbarrena	41,498
Popular Front	IR	Luis Apraiz González Betolaza	40,325
Popular Front	PCE	Jesús Larrañaga Churruca	39,470
Blank ballots			569
Invalid ballots			149

=== Álava ===
2 seats, 1 vote per citizen 1º round

Party	Candidate	Votes
CT (Note: Supported by RE)	José Luis Oriol	16,020
IR (Note: Candidate of the Popular Front)	Ramón Viguri Ruíz de Olano	9,521
PNV	Francisco Javier Landáburu	8,958
CEDA	Luís Pérez Flórez-Estrada	8,681
Others		190

2º round

Party	Candidate	Votes
CT	José Luis Oriol	13,873
IR	Ramón Viguri Ruíz de Olano	10,205
PNV	Francisco Javier Landáburu	9,222
CEDA	Luís Pérez Flórez-Estrada	8,761

=== Navarre ===
7 seats, 5 votes per citizen

Alliance	Party	Candidate	Votes
Right-Wing Block	CEDA	Rafael Aizpún Santafé	82,859
Right-Wing Block	CT	Tomás Domínguez Arévalo	81,370
Right-Wing Block	CEDA	Miguel Gortari Errea	80,263
Right-Wing Block	CT	Francisco J. Martínez de Morentín	79,224
Right-Wing Block	CT	Luis Arellano Dihinx	78,861
Right-Wing Block	CT	Jesús Elizalde y Sáinz de Robles	18,159
Right-Wing Block	Ind	Raimundo García García	76,082
Popular Front	ANV	Juan Carlos Basterra Aramburu	34,987
Popular Front	IR	Ramón Bengaray Zabalza	33,963
Popular Front	PSOE	Constantino Salinas Jaca	33,912
Popular Front	PCE	Jesús Monzón Reparaz	32,274
Popular Front	UR	Aquiles Cuadra de Miguel	32,120
Basque Nationalist	PNV	Manuel de Irujo Ollo	14,799
Others			256
Blank Votes			106

== Aragón ==
Seat distribution in the Congress of Deputies
Electoral List	Political Party	Seats
Popular Front	Republican Left (IR)	7 / 21
Popular Front	Spanish Socialist Workers' Party (PSOE)	2 / 21
Popular Front	Republican Union (UR)	1 / 21
Popular Front	Independent Syndicalist	1 / 21
Total Popular Front		11 / 21
CEDA-led Centre-Right Coalition	Spanish Agrarian Party (PAE)	1 / 21
CEDA-led Right-Wing Coalition	Spanish Confederation of Autonomous Right-Wing Groups (CEDA)	8 / 21
CEDA-led Right-Wing Coalition	Traditionalist Communion (CT)	1 / 21
Total Right-Wing		10 / 21

=== Huesca ===
5 seats, 4 votes per citizen

Alliance	Party	Candidate	Votes
Popular Front	UR	Joaquín Mallo Castán	52,566
Popular Front	IR	Casimiro Lana Serrate	49,964
Popular Front	IR	Ildefonso Beltrán Pueyo	48,611
Popular Front	PSOE	Julián Borderas Pallaruelo	47,001
Anti-Revolutionary Front	PAE	José Moncasi Sangenís	45,580
Anti-Revolutionary Front	CEDA	José Romero Radigales	44,678
Anti-Revolutionary Front	PRP	Cirilo Martín Retortillo	43,262
Anti-Revolutionary Front	CEDA	Lorenso Vidal Tolosa	42,775
Monarchist	RE	Manuel Banzo Echenique	6,113
Radical	PRR	Rafael Ulled	3,496
Spanish Phalanx	FE-JONS	José Antonio Primo de Rivera	322

=== Zaragoza (City) ===
4 seats, 3 votes per citizen

Alliance	Party	Candidate	Votes
Popular Front	IR	Mariano Joven Hernández	44,859
Popular Front	Ind/PSind	Benito Pabón y Suárez de Urbina	44,545
Popular Front	PSOE	Eduardo Castillo Blasco	44,541
Anti-Revolutionary Front	CEDA	Ramón Serrano Suñer	39,244
Anti-Revolutionary Front	CEDA	Santiago Guallar Poza	38,528
Anti-Revolutionary Front	RE	Gumersindo Claramunt Pastor	37,806
Radical	PRR	Francisco Oliver Rubio	3,137
Spanish Phalanx	FE-JONS	Julio Ruiz de Alda	678
Independent Republican Left	Ind/IR	Pedro García Cariñena (Note: Retired)	11

=== Zaragoza (Province) ===
7 seats, 5 votes per citizen

Alliance	Party	Candidate	Votes
Anti-Revolutionary Front	CEDA	Miguel Blasco Roncal	72,148
Anti-Revolutionary Front	CEDA	Dionisio Pérez Viana	71,582
Anti-Revolutionary Front	CT	Jesús Comín Sagües	70,426
Anti-Revolutionary Front	CEDA	José A. Cremades Royo	69,489
Anti-Revolutionary Front	CEDA	J. Mº Sánchez Ventura	68,555
Popular Front	IR	Honorato de Castro Bonel	66,357
Popular Front	IR	Mariano Tejero Manero	65,615
Popular Front	IR	José María Lamana Ullate	65,320
Popular Front	UR	Pedro Sánchez Márquez	64,906
Popular Front	PSOE	Manuel Albar López	64,497
Radical	PRR	José Valenzuela Soler	15,984
Radical	PRR	Luis Lamana Lizarbe	13,816

=== Teruel ===
5 seats, 4 votes per citizen

Alliance	Party	Candidate	Votes
Anti-Revolutionary Front	CEDA	José Mº Julián Gil	57,154
Anti-Revolutionary Front	CEDA	Bartolome Estevan Mata	55,536
Anti-Revolutionary Front	CEDA	Miguel Sancho Izquierdo	53,453
Popular Front	IR	José Pardo Gayoso	37,462
Popular Front	IR	Gregorio Vilatela Abad	37,285
Popular Front	PSOE	Pedro Díez Pérez	37,186
Popular Front	IR	Ramón Segura Ferrer	36,398
Agrarian	PAE	Leopoldo Igual Padilla	25,364
Traditionalist	CT	Urraca Pastor	22,478
Independent Republican	Ind (Note: Supported by the PRR)	Vicente Iranzo Enguita	19,435
Spanish Renovation	RE	Rogerio Sánchez	5,798
Independent Rightist	Ind	Carlos Emilio Montañés	1.558
-	Ind	Gómez de la Serna	353

== Catalonia and the Balearic Islands ==
Seat distribution in the Congress of Deputies
Electoral List	Political Party	Seats
Left Front	Republican Left of Catalonia (ERC)	21 / 61
Left Front	Catalan Republican Action (ACR)	5 / 61
Left Front	Socialist Union of Catalonia (USC)	4 / 61
Left Front	Republican Left (IR)	3 / 61
Left Front	Nationalist Party of the Republican Left (PNRE)	2 / 61
Left Front	Unió de Rabassaires (UdR)	2 / 61
Left Front	Spanish Socialist Workers' Party (PSOE)	1 / 61
Left Front	Communist Party of Spain (PCE)	1 / 61
Left Front	Catalan Proletarian Party (PCP)	1 / 61
Left Front	Workers' Party of Marxist Unification (POUM)	1 / 61
Total Left Front		41 / 61
Front Català d'Ordre	Regionalist League (Lliga)	12 / 61
Front Català d'Ordre	Traditionalist Communion (CT)	1 / 61
CEDA-led Right-Wing Coalition	Independents from the Centre Republican Party	3 / 61
CEDA-led Right-Wing Coalition	Spanish Confederation of Autonomous Right-Wing Groups (CEDA)	3 / 61
CEDA-led Right-Wing Coalition	Regionalist Party of Mallorca (PRMall)	1 / 61
Total Right-Wing		20 / 61

=== Lérida ===
6 seats, 4 votes per citizen

Alliance	Party	Candidate	Votes
Left Front	ERC	Francesc de Paula Jené Aixalá	70,237
Left Front	ERC	Ferran Zulueta Giberga	70,128
Left Front	ERC	Joan Bañeres Caterua	69,833
Left Front	USC	Joan Comorera	69,701
Front Català d'Ordre	Lliga	Manuel Florensa Farré	58,279
Front Català d'Ordre	Lliga	Lluís Piñol Agulló	58,249
Front Català d'Ordre	CEDA	José Abizanda Puntas	57,965
Front Català d'Ordre	CT	Casimir de Sangenís Bertrand	57,889
Radical	PRR	Daniel Riu Periquet	4,614

=== Gerona ===
7 seats, 5 votes per citizen

Alliance	Party	Candidate	Votes
Popular Left Front	ACR	Martí Esteve i Guau	82,597
Popular Left Front	ERC	Josep Puig i Pujades	82,566
Popular Left Front	ERC	Miquel Santaló i Parvorell	81,938
Popular Left Front	ERC	Josep Mascort i Ribot	81,901
Popular Left Front	PNRE	Joan Casanelles i Ibars	81,589
Front Català d'Ordre	Lliga	Carles Badia Malagrida	60,612
Front Català d'Ordre	Lliga	Joan Estelrich Artigues	60,719
Front Català d'Ordre	CEDA	Josep Ayats Surribats	60,361
Front Català d'Ordre	Lliga	Jaume Busquets Morat	60,137
Front Català d'Ordre	CT	Luis Hernando de Larramendi	59,302

=== Barcelona (City) ===
20 seats, 16 votes per citizen

Alliance	Party	Candidate	Votes
Front d'Esquerres	ACR	Lluís Nicolau d'Olwer	262,670
Front d'Esquerres	ACR	Claudio Ametlla Coll	261,135
Front d'Esquerres	ERC	Lluís Companys i Jover	260,990
Front d'Esquerres	ERC	Martí Barrera i Maresma	260,948
Front d'Esquerres	ERC	Pere Coromines i Montaña	260,659
Front d'Esquerres	ERC	Josep Sunyol i Garriga	260,537
Front d'Esquerres	IR	Ramón Nogués Bizet	260,506
Front d'Esquerres	ERC	Mariano Rubio Tuduri	260,302
Front d'Esquerres	IR	Faustino Ballvé Pallicer	259,859
Front d'Esquerres	ERC	Josep Maria Massip i Izabal	259,798
Front d'Esquerres	ERC	Pere Ferrer Batlle	259,798
Front d'Esquerres	USC	Ramón Pla Armengol	258,721
Front d'Esquerres	ERC	Jaume Aiguadé Miró	257,520
Front d'Esquerres	PCE	Miquel Valdés i Valdés	257,190
Front d'Esquerres	PCP	Pere Aznar Seserra	256,880
Front d'Esquerres	POUM	Joaquín Maurín Juliá	256,723
Front Català d'Ordre	Lliga	Juan Ventosa y Calvell	153,751
Front Català d'Ordre	Lliga	Pedro Rahola Molinas	153,247
Front Català d'Ordre	Lliga	Luis Puig de la Bellacasa	153,013
Front Català d'Ordre	Lliga	Felipe Rodés Baldrich	152,870
Front Català d'Ordre	Lliga	Antoni Gabarró i Torres	152,757
Front Català d'Ordre	Lliga	Felip de Solà i Cañizares	152,652
Front Català d'Ordre	Lliga	Vicent Solé de Sojo	152,146
Front Català d'Ordre	Lliga	Joaquín María de Nadal Ferrer	151,972
Front Català d'Ordre	CEDA	Lluís Jover Nonell	151,761
Front Català d'Ordre	Lliga	Francisco Bastos Ansart	151,701
Front Català d'Ordre	Lliga	Joaquín Reig Rodríguez	151,617
Front Català d'Ordre	CT	Joaquim Gomis i Cornet	151,018
Front Català d'Ordre	CEDA	Juan Travería y Pubill	150,795
Front Català d'Ordre	RE	Santiago Torent Buxó	150,249
Front Català d'Ordre	CEDA	Rodrigo Emos y Palos	149,519
Front Català d'Ordre	PRR	Alejandro Lerroux García	149,125

=== Barcelona (Province) ===
14 seats, 11 votes per citizen

Alliance	Party	Candidate	Votes
Front d'Esquerres	PNRE	Juan Lluhí Vallescá	196,613
Front d'Esquerres	ACR	Eduard Ragassol Sarra	196,326
Front d'Esquerres	ERC	Josep Tomàs i Piera	196,057
Front d'Esquerres	ERC	Pere Mestres Albet	196,028
Front d'Esquerres	ERC	Francesc Senyal i Ferrer	195,906
Front d'Esquerres	ERC	Domingo Palet i Barba	195,880
Front d'Esquerres	ERC	José Antonio Trabal Saus	195,680
Front d'Esquerres	UdR	Pablo Padró Canyellas	195,423
Front d'Esquerres	UdR	Josep Calvet Mora	195,319
Front d'Esquerres	USC	Jaume Comes Jo	194,986
Front d'Esquerres	USC	Pelayo Sara Berenguer	194,866
Front Català d'Ordre	Lliga	Josep María Trias de Bes	145,572
Front Català d'Ordre	Lliga	Miquel Vidal i Guardiola	145,473
Front Català d'Ordre	Lliga	Ferran Valls i Taverner	145,453
Front Català d'Ordre	Lliga	Francesc Cambó i Batlle	145,332
Front Català d'Ordre	Lliga	Enrique Maynes Gaspar	145,116
Front Català d'Ordre	Lliga	Narcis Carreres Guiteras	145,025
Front Català d'Ordre	CEDA	Antonio Barata Rocafort	144,952
Front Català d'Ordre	CT	Josep Prat i Piera	144,670
Front Català d'Ordre	PRR	José Polo Otín	144,636
Front Català d'Ordre	CEDA	Josep Cirera i Voltà	144,643
Front Català d'Ordre	CEDA	Ataulfo Tarragó Ruíz	144,556

=== Tarragona ===
7 seats, 5 votes per citizen

Alliance	Party	Candidate	Votes
Left Front	ACR	Josep Briansó Salvador	93,647
Left Front	IR	Marcelino Domingo Sanjuán	93,556
Left Front	ERC	Ventura Gassol i Rovira	92,956
Left Front	ERC	Joan Sentís Nogues	92,741
Left Front	PSOE	Amós Ruiz Lecina	92,284
Front Català d'Ordre	Lliga	Josep Mº Casabo Torras	69,596
Front Català d'Ordre	CT	Joaquim Bau Nolla	69,405
Front Català d'Ordre	Ind	Cayetano Vilella Puig	68,867
Front Català d'Ordre	CEDA	Josep Mullerat Montdevila	68,569
Front Català d'Ordre	PRR	Ramón Barbat Miracle	67,006
Independent Radical	Ind/PRR	Joan Palau Mayor	2,102

=== Ballearic Islands ===
7 seats, 5 votes per citizen

Alliance	Party	Candidate	Votes
Right-Wing Coalition	Ind/PRCen (Note: The Republican Party of the Centre, controlled by Juan March Ordinas, presented themselves as independents in this election)	Juan March Servera	91,809
Right-Wing Coalition	PRMall	Bartolomé Fons y Jofre de Villegas	90,515
Right-Wing Coalition	Ind/PRCen	Pere Matutes Noguera	90,341
Right-Wing Coalition	CEDA	Juan Pujol Martínez	90,190
Right-Wing Coalition	Ind/PRCen	Jaime Suau Pons	87,132
Right-Wing Coalition	CEDA	César Puget Piquer	86,096
Right-Wing Coalition	CEDA	Tomás Salort y de Olives	86,038
Popular Front	UR	Antonio Amer Llodré	58,269
Popular Front	IR	Francisco Carrera Reure	58,150
Popular Front	IR	Bernardo Jofre Roca	58,132
Popular Front	PSOE	Alejandro Jaumé Roselló	56,994
Popular Front	PSOE	Antonio Gomila Pons	56,965

== Region of Valencia ==
Seat distribution in the Congress of Deputies
Electoral List	Political Party	Seats
Popular Front	Republican Left (IR)	11 / 37
Popular Front	Spanish Socialist Workers' Party (PSOE)	9 / 37
Popular Front	Republican Union (UR)	4 / 37
Popular Front	Communist Party of Spain (PCE)	1 / 37
Popular Front	Valencian Left (EV)	1 / 37
Popular Front	Independent Leftist Republican	1 / 37
Total Popular Front		27 / 37
CEDA-led Centre-Right Coalition	Spanish Confederation of Autonomous Right-Wing Groups (CEDA)	2 / 37
CEDA-led Centre-Right Coalition	Independent Republican Party (PRI)	1 / 37
CEDA-led Right-Wing Coalition	Spanish Confederation of Autonomous Right-Wing Groups (CEDA)	7 / 37
Total Right-Wing		10 / 37

=== Castellón ===
On the first round, only the results of CEDA candidate Luis Fabra Sanz are complete, the results for the Centrist candidate Juan Rives Sánchiz corresponds to the results of Castellón de la Plana as of 17 February 1936, the results of the Traditionalist candidates corresponds to partial results published on 17 February 1936 and those of the other candidates corresponds to partial results published on 18 February 1936.

On the second round, only the results of the elected candidates are available.

6 seats, 4 votes per citizen

1º round

Alliance	Party	Candidate	Votes
Right-Wing List	CEDA	Luis Fabra Sanz	55,826
Right-Wing List	CEDA	Ignacio Villalonga Villalba	54,124
Right-Wing List	CEDA	Antonio Martí Olucha	54,267
Right-Wing List	CEDA	José Sanz Cabrera	52,644
Popular Front	IR	Francisco Casas Sala	53,913
Popular Front	Ind	Vicente Fe Castell	54,744
Popular Front	PSOE	Juan Sapiña Camaró	55,846
Popular Front	UR	Francisco Gómez Hidalgo	53,103
Radical	PRR	Ramón Cantos Sáiz de Carlos	26,000
Radical	PRR	Alejandro Lerroux García	28,743
Radical	PRR	Vicente Cantos Figuerola	23,684
Radical	PRR	José Morelló del Pozo	12,882
Catholic-Traditionalist	CT	Joaquín Bau Nolla	26,731
Catholic-Traditionalist	CT	Bautista Soler Martí	23,411
Centre	PCD	Juan Rives Sánchíz	542

2º round

Alliance	Party	Candidate	Votes
Popular Front	IR	Francisco Casas Sala	74,734
Popular Front	Ind	Vicente Fe Castell	74,677
Popular Front	UR	Francisco Gómez Hidalgo	74,616
Popular Front	PSOE	Juan Sapiña Camaró	74,002
Right-Wing List	CEDA	Antonio Martí Olucha	58,276
Right-Wing List	CEDA	Ignacio Villalonga Villalba	57,913
Right-Wing List	CEDA	Luis Fabra Sanz	
Right-Wing List	CEDA	José Sanz Cabrera	
Radical	PRR	Ramón Cantos Sáiz de Carlos	

=== Valencia (City) ===
Only the results of the elected candidates are official. The data for the non-elected candiadtes corresponds to the data garnered at the Provincial Board of the Electoral Census of Valencia on February 18, 1936, and as such, it presents differences from the official result.

7 seats, 5 votes per citizen

Alliance	Party	Candidate	Votes
Popular Front	IR	Juan Peset Aleixandre	84,106
Popular Front	IR	Miguel San Andrés Castro	83,632
Popular Front	PSOE	Manuel Molina Conejero	83,576
Popular Front	EV	Vicente Marco Miranda	83,146
Popular Front	IR	Darío Marcos Cano	83,072
Anti-Revolutionary List	CEDA	Luis Lucía Lucía	68,227
Anti-Revolutionary List	CEDA	José Duato Chapa	67,360
Anti-Revolutionary List	CEDA	Mario Aristoy Santos	55,676
Anti-Revolutionary List	RE	Ricardo Trénor Palavicino	55,302
Anti-Revolutionary List	CEDA	Miguel Fabregat Vidal	54,975
Centrist-Autonomist Coalition	PURA	Sigfrido Blasco Ibáñez	11,599
Centrist-Autonomist Coalition	PURA	Juan Barral Pastor	11,243
Centrist-Autonomist Coalition	PURA	Luis Buixareu Ibáñez	11,112
Centrist-Autonomist Coalition	PURA	Enrique Malboyssón Ponce	10,549
Centrist-Autonomist Coalition	PURA	Joaquín García Ribes	10,421
Conservative	PRC	Francisco Rubio Fernández	1,858
Conservative	PRC	Muñoz	1,726

=== Valencia (Province) ===
Only the results of the elected candidates are official. The data for the non-elected candiadtes corresponds to the data garnered at the Provincial Board of the Electoral Census of Valencia on February 18, 1936, and as such, it presents differences from the official result.

13 seats, 10 votes per citizen

Alliance	Party	Candidate	Votes
Popular Front	IR	Julio Just Jimeno	140,943
Popular Front	IR	Pedro Vargas Guerendiain	140,088
Popular Front	IR	Miguel Pérez Martínez	139,776
Popular Front	IR	Federico Martínez Miñana	139,379
Popular Front	PSOE	Isidro Escandell Úbeda	139,344
Popular Front	PSOE	Pedro García García	139,266
Popular Front	UR	José García-Berlanga Pardo	139,171
Popular Front	PSOE	Enrique Cerezo Senís	138,646
Popular Front	UR	Joaquín La Casta España	138,197
Popular Front	PCE	José Antonio Uribes Moreno	138,139
Anti-Revolutionary List	CEDA	Luis García Guijarro	140,561
Anti-Revolutionary List	CEDA	Francisco Javier Bosch Marín	138,594
Anti-Revolutionary List	CEDA	Julio Colomer Vidal	137,963
Anti-Revolutionary List	CEDA	Manuel Simó Marín	139,215
Anti-Revolutionary List	CEDA	Fernando Oria de Rueda	136,812
Anti-Revolutionary List	CEDA	José María Costa Serrano	136,204
Anti-Revolutionary List	CEDA	Joaquín Ballester Lloret	135,908
Anti-Revolutionary List	CEDA	Luis Simarro Rigal	135,411
Anti-Revolutionary List	CEDA	Santiago Miralles Hurtado	134,812
Anti-Revolutionary List	CT	Mariano Puigdollers	133,901
Centrist-Autonomist Coalition	PCD	José Martí de Vese	61,412
Centrist-Autonomist Coalition	PURA	Gerardo Carreres Baycarri	60,812
Centrist-Autonomist Coalition	PURA	Vicente Iborra Gil	59,901
Centrist-Autonomist Coalition	PURA	Ángel Puig Puig	58,404
Centrist-Autonomist Coalition	PURA	Juan Chavret Bru	57,211
Centrist-Autonomist Coalition	PURA	Pascual Martínez Sala	56,102
Centrist-Autonomist Coalition	PURA	Graco Marsá Vancells	55,403
Centrist-Autonomist Coalition	PURA	Teodoro López Sanmartín	54,810
Centrist-Autonomist Coalition	PURA	Faustino Pérez Manglano	53,211
Centrist-Autonomist Coalition	PURA	Francisco Jiménez Aleixandre	52,104
Conservative	PRC	Ernesto Bellvé Bueno	3,512
Conservative	PRC	Mateu	2,104

=== Alicante ===
11 seats, 8 votes per citizen

Alliance	Party	Candidate	Votes
Popular Front	IR	Carlos Esplá Rizo	131,274
Popular Front	UR	Jerónimo Gomáriz Latorre	131,139
Popular Front	IR	Juan José Cremades Fons	131,059
Popular Front	PSOE	Rodolfo Llopis Ferrándiz	130,470
Popular Front	PSOE	Ginés Ganga Treviño	129,972
Popular Front	IR	Eliseo Gómez Serrano	129,905
Popular Front	PSOE	Miguel Villalta Gisbert	129,596
Popular Front	PSOE	Salvador García Muñoz	129,397
Right-Wing Coalition	PRI	Joaquín Chapaprieta	113,875
Right-Wing Coalition	CEDA	Juan Torres Sala	111,026
Right-Wing Coalition	CEDA	Eusebio Escolano Gonzalvo	110,974
Right-Wing Coalition	PCD	José Canalejas y Fernández	110,112
Right-Wing Coalition	CEDA	Rafael Alberola Herrera	110,006
Right-Wing Coalition	Ind	Silvino Navarro (Note: Even though he presented himself as an independent, he was in reality a shadow candidate ("tapado") of the CEDA.)	107,255
Right-Wing Coalition	PCD	Miguel de Cámara Cendoya	106,777
Right-Wing Coalition	Ind	Baldomero Martínez de León	102,870
Traditionalist	CT	Manuel Senante	9,926
Radical Republican	PRR	César Oarrichena	4,322
Conservative	PRC	José Martínez Arenas	763
Independent Socialist	Ind/PSOE	Manuel González Ramos	596
Blank Votes			107

== Region of Murcia ==
Seat distribution in the Congress of Deputies
Electoral List	Political Party	Seats
Popular Front	Republican Left (IR)	5 / 20
Popular Front	Spanish Socialist Workers' Party (PSOE)	4 / 20
Popular Front	Republican Union (UR)	4 / 20
Total Popular Front		13 / 20
CEDA-led Centre-Right Coalition	Spanish Confederation of Autonomous Right-Wing Groups (CEDA)	2 / 20
CEDA-led Centre-Right Coalition	Party of the Democratic Centre (PCD)	2 / 20
CEDA-led Centre-Right Coalition	Spanish Agrarian Party (PAE)	1 / 20
CEDA-led Centre-Right Coalition	Progressive Republican Party (PRP)	1 / 20
CEDA-led Centre-Right Coalition	Independent Rightist	1 / 20
Total Right-Wing		7 / 20

=== Albacete ===
7 seats, 5 votes per citizen

Alliance	Party	Candidate	Votes
Centre-Right Coalition	CEDA (Note: Supported by RE)	Pedro Acacio Sandoval	75,632
Centre-Right Coalition	CEDA	Antonio Bernabeu de Yeste	75,361
Centre-Right Coalition	PAE	Mateo Sánchez Rovira	74,325
Centre-Right Coalition	PRP	Leopoldo López López	64,256
Centre-Right Coalition	PCD	Manuel Aznar Zuvigaray	21,128
Centre-Right Coalition	PRR	Edmundo Alfaro Gironda	39,517
Republican-Socialist Coalition	UR	Maximiliano Martínez Moreno	57,661
Republican-Socialist Coalition	IR	Enrique Navarro Esparcia	57,215
Republican-Socialist Coalition	IR	Esteban Mirasol Ruiz	56,934
Republican-Socialist Coalition	PSOE	José Prat García	46,480
Republican-Socialist Coalition	PSOE	Esteban Martínez Hervás	55,694
Right-Wing	RE	Antonio Gotor Cuartero	15,764

=== Murcia (City) ===
Only the results from the Popular Front and the Centre-Right Coalition are complete, the results of the other candidates corresponds to partial results (~8% missing) published on 18 February 1936

4 seats, 3 votes per citizen

Alliance	Party	Candidate	Votes
Popular Front	PSOE	Melchor Guerrero Pelgaro	41,146
Popular Front	UR	José Moreno Galvache	40,956
Popular Front	IR	José Díaz Fernández	38,680
Centre-Right List	Ind (Note: Nominated by the CEDA)	Agustín Virgili Quintanilla	26,896
Centre-Right List	CEDA	Adrián Viudes Guirao	23,437
Centre-Right List	Ind (Note: Nominated by the PCD)	José Cardona Serra	20,833
Republican Left	Ind/IR	Manuel Biedma Hernández	3,346
Radical	PRR	Salvador Martínez-Moya	2,907
Traditionalist	CT	Francisco Martínez García	1,479
Federal Left	Ind	José Bernal Segado	1,055
Agrarian	PAE	Agustín Escribano Guixe	199

=== Murcia (Province) ===
9 seats, 7 votes per citizen

Alliance	Party	Candidate	Votes
Popular Front	UR	Juan Antonio Méndez	90,579
Popular Front	PSOE	Amancio Muñoz de Zafra	90,159
Popular Front	PSOE	Francisco Félix Montiel	89,839
Popular Front	PSOE	Pascual Tomás Taengua	89,839
Popular Front	IR	Félix Templado	89,839
Popular Front	IR	Alfonso Ruíz Blázquez	89,741
Popular Front	UR	Francisco López Goicoechea	89,650
Centre-Right List	PCD	Manuel Rico Avello	83,367
Centre-Right List	PCD	Manuel Medina Clares	82,981
Centre-Right List	CEDA	José Ibáñez Martín	80,886
Centre-Right List	CEDA	Tomás Maestre Zapata	80,674
Centre-Right List	CEDA	Federico Salmón Amorín	80,583
Centre-Right List	Ind	Alfonso Torres	79,343
Centre-Right List	PCD	Gonzalo de Figueroa	77,483

== New Castile ==
Seat distribution in the Congress of Deputies
Electoral List	Political Party	Seats
Popular Front	Spanish Socialist Workers' Party (PSOE)	13 / 55
Popular Front	Republican Left (IR)	10 / 55
Popular Front	Republican Union (UR)	2 / 55
Popular Front	Communist Party of Spain (PCE)	1 / 55
Popular Front	Independent Leftist Republicans	1 / 55
Total Popular Front		27 / 55
CEDA-led Centre-Right Coalition	Spanish Confederation of Autonomous Right-Wing Groups (CEDA)	10 / 55
CEDA-led Centre-Right Coalition	Spanish Agrarian Party (PAE)	1 / 55
CEDA-led Centre-Right Coalition	Radical Republican Party (PRR)	1 / 55
CEDA-led Centre-Right Coalition	Spanish Renewal (RE)	1 / 55
CEDA-led Centre-Right Coalition	Independent Republican	1 / 55
CEDA-led Right-Wing Coalition	Spanish Confederation of Autonomous Right-Wing Groups (CEDA)	10 / 55
CEDA-led Right-Wing Coalition	Spanish Agrarian Party (PAE)	1 / 55
CEDA-led Right-Wing Coalition	Traditionalist Communion (CT)	1 / 55
CEDA-led Right-Wing Coalition	Independent Monarchists	2 / 55
Total Right-Wing		28 / 55

=== Madrid (City) ===
17 seats, 13 votes per citizen

Alliance	Party	Candidate	Votes
Popular Front	PSOE	Julián Besteiro Fernández	224,450
Popular Front	UR	Diego Martínez Barrio	224,337
Popular Front	IR	Manuel Azaña Díaz	223,826
Popular Front	IR	Leandro Pérez Urria	222,642
Popular Front	PSOE	Luis Jiménez de Asúa	222,639
Popular Front	IR	Enrique Ramos Ramos	222,600
Popular Front	IR	Antonio Velao Oñate	222,556
Popular Front	PSOE	Luis Araquistaín Quevedo	221,247
Popular Front	PSOE	Enrique de Francisco Jiménez	221,129
Popular Front	PSOE	Carlos Hernández Zancajo	220,893
Popular Front	PSOE	Julio Álvarez del Vayo	220,838
Popular Front	PSOE	Francisco Largo Caballero	220,310
Popular Front	PCE	José Díaz Ramos	220,195
Counter-Revolutionary List	CEDA	José María Gil-Robles	186,113
Counter-Revolutionary List	CEDA	Rafael Marín Lázaro	186,090
Counter-Revolutionary List	CEDA	Antonio Bermúdez Cañete	185,997
Counter-Revolutionary List	CEDA	Mariano Serrano Mendicute	185,929
Counter-Revolutionary List	CEDA	Honorio Riesgo García	185,706
Counter-Revolutionary List	Ind	Antonio Royo Villanova	185,610
Counter-Revolutionary List	RE	José Calvo Sotelo	185,114
Counter-Revolutionary List	CT	Ramón Oyarzun Oyarzun	185,098
Counter-Revolutionary List	RE	Luis María de Zunzunegui	185,070
Counter-Revolutionary List	RE	Luis Martínez de Galinsoga	184,494
Counter-Revolutionary List	Ind	Ernesto Jiménez Caballero	183,694
Counter-Revolutionary List	PRR	Ángel Velarde García	184,674
Counter-Revolutionary List	PRR	Gabriel Montero Labandero	184,233
Spanish Phalanx	FE-JONS	José Antonio Primo de Rivera	4,995
Spanish Phalanx	FE-JONS	Julio Ruiz de Alda	3,577
Spanish Phalanx	FE-JONS	Raimundo Fernández-Cuesta	3,299
Spanish Phalanx	FE-JONS	Rafael Sánchez Mazas	3,253
Others			346
Blank votes			703
Invalid votes			7

=== Madrid (Province) ===
8 seats, 6 votes per citizen

Alliance	Party	Candidate	Votes
Popular Front	UR	Manuel Torres Campañá	93,377
Popular Front	IR	Roberto Escribano Iglesias	92,338
Popular Front	PSOE	Carlos Rubiera Rodríguez	91,956
Popular Front	PSOE	Luis Rufilanchas Gallego	91,878
Popular Front	PSOE	Julia Álvarez Resano	91,732
Popular Front	IR	Luis Fernández Clérigo	91,604
Counter-Revolutionary List	CEDA	Rafael Esparza García	71,266
Counter-Revolutionary List	CEDA	Luis Fernández de Heredia	71,257
Counter-Revolutionary List	CEDA	Javier Martín Artajo	71,150
Counter-Revolutionary List	CEDA	José Delgado y Hernández	71,118
Counter-Revolutionary List	RE	Emilio Alfredo Serrano Jover	71,052
Counter-Revolutionary List	CEDA	Juan Manuel Puente Fanz	70,325
Others			851
Blank votes			487

=== Guadalajara ===
4 seats, 3 votes per candidate

Alliance	Party	Candidate	Votes
Right-Wing List	CEDA	José Arizcun Moreno	44,923
Right-Wing List	Ind	Álvaro de Figueroa y Torres	44,756
Right-Wing List	Ind	Álvaro de Figueroa y Alonso Martínez	42,785
Right-Wing List	CEDA	Félix Valenzuela de Hita	41,664
Popular Front	PSOE	Marcelino Martín González	26,897
Popular Front	IR	Julio Tortuero Berrenche	25,600
Popular Front	UR	Asclo Plaza Vinuesa	24,113
Centrists	PRP	Luis Casuso y Obeso	7,735
Independent Monarchist	Ind	Fernando Palanca Martínez	1,522
Blank votes			133

=== Toledo ===
10 seats, 8 votes per district

Alliance	Party	Candidate	Votes
Anti-Revolutionary List	CEDA	Dimas de Madariaga Almendros	129,222
Anti-Revolutionary List	CEDA	Dimas Adánez Horcajuelo	128,786
Anti-Revolutionary List	CEDA	Jesús Salvador Madero	128,687
Anti-Revolutionary List	CEDA	Ramón Molina Nieto	128,045
Anti-Revolutionary List	PAE	Luis Felipe Sánchez-Cabezudo	127,634
Anti-Revolutionary List	CEDA	Félix Avia García	127,571
Anti-Revolutionary List	CEDA	José Finat Escrivá de Romaní	127,145
Anti-Revolutionary List	CT	Jesús Requejo San Román	125,513
Popular Front	IR	Manuel Álvarez Ugena	80,684
Popular Front	IR	Emilio Palomo Aguado	80,189
Popular Front	IR	Félix Urabayen Guindo	79,849
Popular Front	UR	Andrés Torres Beleña	79,580
Popular Front	PSOE	Orencio Labrador Maza	79,458
Popular Front	PSOE	Santiago Muñoz Martínez	79,373
Popular Front	PSOE	Moisés Gameto de la Fuente	79,314
Popular Front	PCE	Virgilio Carretero Maenza	78,985
Centrists	PRP	Juan José Benayas	30,880
Radical	PRR	José Esteban Infantes	12,745
Spanish Phalanx	FE-JONS	José Antonio Primo de Rivera	1,479
Spanish Phalanx	FE-JONS	José Saínz Nothnagel	1,103
Spanish Phalanx	FE-JONS	Rafael Sánchez Mazas	685
-	Ind	Juan Pérez Monge	117
Other votes			230
Blank votes			120

=== Cuenca ===
In the repeated elections, the official results, without taking into account electoral fraud, are presented. As he was not an "official candidate", Primo de Rivera's votes weren't counted in the final official result. The following vote figure corresponds to a table (pg. 296) of "a recount, electoral record by electoral record" done by López Villaverde which rules out cases of electoral fraud.

6 seats, 4 votes per citizen

Cancelled elections

Alliance	Party	Candidate	Votes
Counter-Revolutionaries	CEDA	Manuel Casanova Conderana	56,415
Counter-Revolutionaries	RE	Antonio Goicoechea y Conderana	53,491
Counter-Revolutionaries	Ind	Joaquín Fanjul Goñi	53,277
Counter-Revolutionaries	CEDA	Modesto Gosálvez Fuentes Manresa	52,291
Counter-Revolutionaries	CEDA	Enrique Cuartero Pascual	50,609
Counter-Revolutionaries	PRR	Tomás Sierra Rustarazo	46,429
Popular Front	IR	Aurelio López-Malo Andrés	34,753
Popular Front	PSOE	Aurelio Almagro Gracia	32,544
Popular Front	IR	Albino Lasso Conde	31,373
Popular Front	PSOE	Luis García Cubertoret	30,446
Centre	PCD	José Mª Álvarez Mendizábal Bonilla	31,289
Centre	PCD	Jesús Martínez Correcher	22,656
Independent Monarchist	Ind	Cayo Faustino Conversa Martínez	18,578
-	Ind	Manuel Alique	25
-	Ind	José Ignacio Fanjul Sedeño	10

Repeated elections on 3 May 1936

Alliance	Party	Candidate	Votes
Popular Front	IR	Aurelio López-Malo Andrés	69,407
Popular Front	IR	Albino Lasso Conde	66,091
Popular Front	PSOE	Luis García Cubertoret	63,843
Popular Front	Ind	José Mª Álvarez Mendizábal Bonilla	63,634
Right-Wing List	CEDA	Modesto Gosálvez Fuentes Manresa	48,573
Right-Wing List	CEDA	Manuel Casanova y Conderana	48,334
Right-Wing List	RE	Antonio Goicoechea Cosculluela	46,077
Right-Wing List	FE-JONS	José Antonio Primo de Rivera	45,828

=== Ciudad Real ===
The results obtained by Hipólito Jiménez y Jiménez Coronado aren't complete and were published on 18 February 1936.

10 seats, 8 votes per citizen

Alliance	Party	Candidate	Votes
Anti-Revolutionary List	CEDA	Rafael Melgarejo Tordesillas	106,455
Anti-Revolutionary List	CEDA	Ramón Díez de Rivera Casares	104,262
Anti-Revolutionary List	CEDA	José María de Mateo Laiglesia	104,051
Anti-Revolutionary List	PAE	Daniel Mondejar Fúnez	104,728
Anti-Revolutionary List	RE	Andrés Rebuelta Melgarejo	102,104
Anti-Revolutionary List	CEDA	Francisco Cervera y Jiménez	100,541
Anti-Revolutionary List	Ind	Luis Ruiz Valdepeñas Utrilla	99,187
Anti-Revolutionary List	PRR	Joaquín Pérez Madrigal	89,379
Popular Front	PSOE	José Maestro San José	82,168
Popular Front	PSOE	Antonio Cabrera Toba (Note: On March 30, his ellection is anulled by the electoral commission and proclaims Marino Sáiz member of the Cortes in his place)	81,685
Popular Front	PSOE	Marino Sáiz Sánchez	81,658
Popular Front	UR	Francisco Serrano Pacheco	81,565
Popular Front	IR	Arturo Gómez Lobo	80,716
Popular Front	IR	Vicente Gómez Sánchez	80,043
Popular Front	UR	Ernesto Sempere Beneyto	79,812
Popular Front	PCE	Trifón Medrano Llurba	79,329
Progressives	PRP	Cirilo del Río Rodríguez	50,390
Progressives	PRP	Fidenciano Trujillo Posada	18,979
Progressives	PRP	Fernando Frías López	14,349
Independent Radical	Ind/PRR	Francisco Morayta Martínez	8,222
Independent Monarchist	Ind/RE	Manuel González de Jonte	5,806
Liberal Democrat	PRLD	Hipólito Jiménez y Jiménez Coronado	194

== Extremadura ==
Seat distribution in the Congress of Deputies
Electoral List	Political Party	Seats
Popular Front	Spanish Socialist Workers' Party (PSOE)	9 / 23
Popular Front	Republican Left (IR)	5 / 23
Popular Front	Republican Union (UR)	3 / 23
Popular Front	Communist Party of Spain (PCE)	1 / 23
Total Popular Front		18 / 23
CEDA-led Centre-Right Coalition	Party of the Democratic Centre (PCD)	2 / 23
CEDA-led Centre-Right Coalition	Spanish Confederation of Autonomous Right-Wing Groups (CEDA)	1 / 23
CEDA-led Centre-Right Coalition	Radical Republican Party (PRR)	1 / 23
CEDA-led Centre-Right Coalition	Independent Republican	1 / 23
Total Right-Wing		5 / 23

=== Cáceres ===
9 seats, 7 votes per citizen

Alliance	Party	Candidate	Votes
Popular Front	IR	José Giral Pereira	98,516
Popular Front	UR	Fulgencio Díaz Pastor	97,282
Popular Front	IR	Luís Martínez de Carvajal	97,275
Popular Front	UR	Faustino Valentín Torrejón	96,692
Popular Front	PSOE	Luis Romero Solano	96,418
Popular Front	PSOE	Rafael Bermudo Ardura	96,314
Popular Front	PSOE	Felipe Granado Valdivia	96,237
Counter-Revolutionary Coalition	Ind	Teodoro Pascual Cordero	95,662
Counter-Revolutionary Coalition	CEDA	Victor José Berjano Gómez	95,450
Counter-Revolutionary Coalition	CEDA	Adolfo Rodríguez Jurado	95,440
Counter-Revolutionary Coalition	CEDA	Eduardo Silva Gregorio	94,925
Counter-Revolutionary Coalition	CEDA	Luis María Narvaez de Ulloa	94,780
Counter-Revolutionary Coalition	RE	Honorio Maura y Gamazo	90,782
Counter-Revolutionary Coalition	PCD	Francisco Morata Pedreño	88,064
Radical	PRR	Martín Duque Fuentes	7,647
Radical	PRR	Mariano Arrazola Madera	7,065
Radical	PRR	Miguel Carmona Sobrino	4,262
Radical	PRR	Domingo Martín Javato	4,180
Phalanx	FE	José Antonio Primo de Rivera	4,427
Phalanx	FE	José Luna Meléndez	2,200
Phalanx	FE	Manuel Mateo y Villarroel	2,034
Cultural Independent	Ind	José Mediavilla Liñán	2,471
Cultural Independent	Ind	José Gironda Canales	386
Independent Popular Action	Ind/CEDA	Fernando Vega Bermejo	16
Blank votes			77

=== Badajoz ===
Only the results from the elected candidates are complete, the results for the other candidates corresponds to largely incomplete (~4% missing) results published on 19 February 1936

14 seats, 11 votes per citizen

Alliance	Party	Candidate	Votes
Popular Front	PSOE	José Aliseda Olivares	168,411
Popular Front	PSOE	Rizardo Zabalza Elorga	168,270
Popular Front	IR	Miguel Muñoz González de Ocampo	168,223
Popular Front	IR	Vicente Sol Sánchez	168,162
Popular Front	PSOE	Simeón Vidarte y Franco Romero	168,069
Popular Front	PSOE	José Sosa Hormiga	168,003
Popular Front	IR	Jesús de Miguel Lancho	167,953
Popular Front	PSOE	Margarita Nelken de Pau	167,829
Popular Front	PSOE	Nicolás de Pablo Hernández	167,825
Popular Front	UR	Fernando Valera Aparicio	167,590
Popular Front	PCE	Pedro Martínez Cartón	167,372
Centre-Right Block	PCD	José Rosado Gil	143,003
Centre-Right Block	PCD	Fermín Daza y Díaz del Castillo	142,350
Centre-Right Block	PRR	Luis Bardají López	142,248
Centre-Right Block	CEDA	Francisco de Asís Sánchez Miranda	138,509
Centre-Right Block	CEDA	Luis Hermida Villegas	137,445
Centre-Right Block	CEDA	Francisco López de Ayala	137,904
Centre-Right Block	CEDA	Antonio María Fernández Domínguez	138,485
Centre-Right Block	PRR	Rafael Salazar Alonso	138,265
Centre-Right Block	PRR	Diego Hidalgo Durán	138,627
Centre-Right Block	PAE	José Díaz-Ambrona	138,738
Centre-Right Block	RE	Antonio del Solar y Taboada	138,363

== Andalusia ==
Seat distribution in the Congress of Deputies
Electoral List	Political Party	Seats
Popular Front	Spanish Socialist Workers' Party (PSOE)	36 / 93
Popular Front	Republican Left (IR)	15 / 93
Popular Front	Republican Union (UR)	15 / 93
Popular Front	Communist Party of Spain (PCE)	7 / 93
Popular Front	Federal Democratic Republican Party (PRDF)	1 / 93
Popular Front	Syndicalist Party (PSind)	1 / 93
Total Popular Front		75 / 93
CEDA-led Centre-Right Coalition	Progressive Republican Party (PRP)	5 / 93
CEDA-led Centre-Right Coalition	Spanish Confederation of Autonomous Right-Wing Groups (CEDA)	3 / 93
CEDA-led Centre-Right Coalition	Party of the Democratic Centre (PCD)	3 / 93
CEDA-led Centre-Right Coalition	Spanish Renewal (RE)	1 / 93
CEDA-led Centre-Right Coalition	Spanish Agrarian Party (PAE)	1 / 93
CEDA-led Centre-Right Coalition	Mesocrat Party	1 / 93
CEDA-led Right-Wing Coalition	Spanish Confederation of Autonomous Right-Wing Groups (CEDA)	3 / 93
CEDA-led Right-Wing Coalition	Traditionalist Communion (CT)	1 / 93
Total Right-Wing		18 / 93

=== Huelva ===
7 seats, 5 votes per citizen

Alliance	Party	Candidate	Votes
Popular Front	PRDF	Luis Cordero Bel	79,667
Popular Front	UR	Santiago López Rodríguez	79,536
Popular Front	PSOE	Juan Gutiérrez Prieto	79,156
Popular Front	PSOE	Crescenciano Bilbao Castellanos	79,122
Popular Front	PSOE	Ramón González Peña	78,782
Counter-Revolutionary Front	PCD	Joaquín Urzaiz Cadaval	66,841
Counter-Revolutionary Front	CEDA	Francisco Pérez de Guzmán y Urzaiz	66,618
Counter-Revolutionary Front	CEDA	Manuel Sánchez-Dalp y Marañón	65,201
Counter-Revolutionary Front	PRR	Fernando Rey Mora	64,741
Counter-Revolutionary Front	Ind	Dionisio Cano López	64,357
Agrarian	PAE	Manuel Burgos y Mazo	4,897
Agrarian	PAE	Nicolás Vázquez de la Corte	4,079

=== Seville (City) ===
6 seats, 4 votes per citizen

Alliance	Party	Candidate	Votes
Popular Front	UR	Manuel Blasco Garzón	74,993
Popular Front	IR	José Mª Aguilar Calvo	74,696
Popular Front	PSOE	Alberto Fernández Ballesteros	74,675
Popular Front	PCE	Antonio Mitje García	74,476
Right-Wing Coalition	CEDA	Jesús Pabón y Suárez de Urbina	43,728
Right-Wing Coalition	CT	Ginés Martínez Rubio	43,091
Right-Wing Coalition	CEDA	Jaime Oriol de la Puerta	43,072
Right-Wing Coalition	CEDA	José Mª Olivares Fernández	42,966
Spanish Phalanx	FE-JONS	José Antonio Primo de Rivera	942
Spanish Phalanx	FE-JONS	Sancho Dávila y Fernández de Celis	857

=== Seville (Province) ===
Only the results from the elected candidates are complete, the results for the other candidates corresponds to largely incomplete (~4% missing) results published on 18 February 1936

10 seats, 8 votes per citizen

Alliance	Party	Candidate	Votes
Popular Front	UR	Ramón González Sicilia y de la Corte	100,171
Popular Front	UR	Antonio Lara Zárate	100,111
Popular Front	IR	Manuel Pérez y Jofre de Villegas	100,076
Popular Front	UR	José González y Fernández de la Bandera	100,044
Popular Front	PSOE	Manuel Barrios Jiménez	100,028
Popular Front	UR	Rafael de Pina Millán	100,019
Popular Front	PSOE	José Moya Navarro	99,974
Popular Front	PSOE	Víctor Adolfo Carretero Rodríguez	99,938
Centre-Right List	PRP	Manuel Figueroa Rojas	81,466
Centre-Right List	PCD	Antonio de Seras González	81,442
Centre-Right List	PRC	Miguel García y Bravo-Ferrer	79,189
Centre-Right List	CEDA	Manuel Beca Mateos	79,169
Centre-Right List	CEDA	Miguel Bermudo Barrera	79,160
Centre-Right List	CEDA	Isacio Contreras Rodríguez	79,156
Centre-Right List	CEDA	José Luis Illanes del Río	79,152
Centre-Right List	CEDA	Luis Alarcón de la Lastra	79,151

=== Córdoba ===
13 seats, 10 votes per citizen

Alliance	Party	Candidate	Votes
Popular Front	UR	Pedro Rico López	158,011
Popular Front	IR	Ramón Rubio Vicenti	157,793
Popular Front	IR	Antonio Jaén Morente	157,547
Popular Front	PSOE	Vicente Martín Romera	156,204
Popular Front	PSOE	Wenceslao Carrillo Alonso	156,140
Popular Front	PSOE	Manuel Castro Molina	155,969
Popular Front	PSOE	Eduardo Blanco Fernández	155,272
Popular Front	PCE	Bautista Garcés Granell	153,844
Popular Front	PCE	Jesús Hernández Tomás	153,301
Popular Front	PSOE	Antonio Bujalance López	153,119
Antirevolutionary List	PRP	Federico Fernández Castillejo	110,165
Antirevolutionary List	PRP	Rafael Delgado Benítez	109,534
Antirevolutionary List	PRP	José Tomás Rubio Chávarri	109,246
Antirevolutionary List	CEDA	Fernando Porras Ruiz de Pedrosa	103,463
Antirevolutionary List	CEDA	Rafael Muñoz Córdoba	103,363
Antirevolutionary List	CEDA	José Montero Tirado	103,285
Antirevolutionary List	CEDA	Laureano Fernández Martos	103,198
Antirevolutionary List	CEDA	Bartolomé Torrico Martos	101,555
Antirevolutionary List	CEDA	Adolfo Virgili Quintanilla	101,448
Antirevolutionary List	RE	José Cruz Conde	97,591
Republican Alliance	PRR	Rafael Castejón y M. de Arizala	7,286
Republican Alliance	PRR	Eloy Vaquero Cantillo	6,883
Republican Alliance	PRC	Pascual Calderón Uclés	4,789
Republican Alliance	PRR	Mateo Dueñas Calero	4,032
Republican Alliance	PRR	Jorge Burgos Rubio	3,938
Republican Alliance	PRR	Pedro Zurita Villalba	3,900
Republican Alliance	PRR	José Rodríguez Cabezas	3,855
Independent Republican	Ind	Joaquín de Pablo-Blanco	4,626
Spanish Phalanx	FE	Rogelio Vignote Vignote	1,553
Spanish Phalanx	FE	Pedro Antonio Baquerizo García	1,333
Labourist Action	Ind	Juan B. Fernández Martín	170
Labourist Action	Ind	Antonio Fernández Cantero	95

=== Cádiz ===
Only the results from the elected candidates are complete, the results for the other candidates corresponds to largely incomplete (~6% missing) results published on 18 February 1936

10 seats, 8 votes per citizen

Alliance	Party	Candidate	Votes
Popular Front	IR	Manuel Muñoz Martínez	98,437
Popular Front	UR	Manuel Sánchez Caballero	98,296
Popular Front	UR	Gabriel González Taltabull	98,154
Popular Front	PSOE	Rafael Calvo Cuadrado	98,107
Popular Front	PSOE	Juan Campos Villagrán	98,076
Popular Front	IR	Francisco Aguado de Miguel	98,001
Popular Front	PCE	Daniel Ortega Martínez	97,818
Popular Front	PSind	Ángel Pestaña Núñez	97,667
Counter-Revolutionary Front	PCD	José Antonio Canals	64,577
Counter-Revolutionary Front	RE	Ramón de Carranza y Fdez. Reguera	64,326
Counter-Revolutionary Front	CEDA	Manuel García Atance	59,697
Counter-Revolutionary Front	CEDA	Félix Bragado Álvarez	59,661
Counter-Revolutionary Front	RE	Francisco Moreno Herrera	59,371
Counter-Revolutionary Front	CEDA	Carlos Núñez Manso	58,139
Counter-Revolutionary Front	PRR	Julio Valera Vázquez	56,417
Counter-Revolutionary Front	CT	José Palomino Jiménez	54,552
Spanish Phalanx	FE	José Antonio Primo de Rivera	6,965

=== Málaga (City) ===
4 seats, 3 votes per citizen

Alliance	Party	Candidate	Votes
Popular Front	IR	Luis Velasco Damas	55,295
Popular Front	PSOE	Antonio Fernández Bolaños	55,224
Popular Front	PCE	Cayetano Bolívar Escribano	52,748
Popular Front	PSOE	Luis Dorado	27,657
Right-Wing Coalition	CEDA	Emilio Hermida Rodríguez	14,352
Right-Wing Coalition	Ind	Modesto Escobar Acosta	13,531
Right-Wing Coalition	RE	Ignacio Muñoz RoJas	13,446
Radical Republican	PRR	Eduardo Maldonado Leal	1,510
Labourist Action (Note: "On Gil Robles' orders, a candidacy was presented in the capital under the name "Workers' Action" with the sole objective of diverting some workers' votes that would otherwise go to the Popular Front." (pg.474))	Ind	José Guerra Gómez	43
Labourist Action	Ind	Fernando Ors	0
Labourist Action	Ind	Jesús Obregon	0

=== Málaga (Province) ===
8 seats, 6 votes per citizen

Alliance	Party	Candidate	Votes
Popular Front	UR	Eduardo Frapolli y Ruiz de la Herrán	79,029
Popular Front	IR	Emilio Baeza Medina	78,972
Popular Front	PSOE	Vicente Sarmiento Ruiz	78,324
Popular Front	IR	Federico Casamayor Toscano	77,793
Popular Front	PSOE	Antonio Acuña Carballar	77,688
Popular Front	UR	Federico Alva Varela	77,308
Centre-Right	PRP	José María Roldán y Sánchez de la Fuente	49,509
Centre-Right	CEDA	Bernardo Laude Álvarez	48,830
Centre-Right	Ind.	Luis Armiñán Pérez	48,262
Centre-Right	CEDA	Ángel Fernández Ruano	48,262
Centre-Right	PAE	José María Hinojosa Lasarte	46,470
Centre-Right	Larista	José Estrada y Estrada	44,944
Radical Republican	PRR	Pedro Armasa Briales	~6%
Radical Republican	PRR	Francisco Burgos Díaz	~6%
Radical Republican	PRR	Salvador González Anaya	~6%
Labourist Action	Ind	Fernando Ors	~0%
Labourist Action	Ind	José Guerra Gómez	~0%
Labourist Action	Ind	Jesús Obregón	~0%

=== Jaén ===
13 seats, 10 votes per citizen

Alliance	Party	Candidate	Votes
Popular Front	UR	Bernardo Giner de los Ríos	138,340
Popular Front	PSOE	Jerónimo Bugeda Muñoz	138,288
Popular Front	PSOE	Juan Lozano Ruiz	138,168
Popular Front	PSOE	Alejandro Peris Caruana	138,129
Popular Front	PSOE	Tomás Álvarez Angulo	137,973
Popular Front	IR	Pedro Fernández Hernández	137,913
Popular Front	PSOE	José López Quero	137,690
Popular Front	IR	Victoria Kent Siano	137,558
Popular Front	PCE	Vicente Uribe Galdeano	137,548
Popular Front	PSOE	Antonio Pasagali Lobo	136,854
Centre-Right List	Mesocrat	José de Acuña	135,774
Centre-Right List	PRR	José Pérez de Rozas (Note: On March 24, his ellection is anulled by the electoral commission and proclaims Moreno Torres member of the Cortes in his place)	135,012
Centre-Right List	PAE	José Blanco Rodríguez	134,398
Centre-Right List	CEDA	José María Martínez	133,971
Centre-Right List	CEDA	Fermín Palma García	133,931
Centre-Right List	CEDA	José Moreno Torres	133,634
Centre-Right List	PAE	León Carlos Álvarez	132,882
Centre-Right List	CEDA	José Alberto Palanca	132,873
Centre-Right List	CT	Antonio Garzón Marín	131,506
Centre-Right List	PRP	Miguel Pastor Orozco	129,591
Spanish Phalanx	FE	Raimundo Fernández Cuesta	6,930
Conservative	PRC	Enrique del Castillo Folache	3,554
Conservative	PRC	Genaro Navarro López	3,112
Conservative	PRC	Lorenzo Lara Guixé	2,643
Spanish Renovation	RE	Antonio Marín Acuña	5

=== Granada ===
13 seats, 10 votes per citizen

Cancelled elections

Alliance	Party	Candidate	Votes
Counter-Revolutionary Front	PAE	Francisco González Carrascosa	148,649
Counter-Revolutionary Front	CEDA	Manuel Torres López	148,304
Counter-Revolutionary Front	CEDA	José Fernández Arroyo y Caro	148,196
Counter-Revolutionary Front	PCD	Natalio Rivas Santiago	148,171
Counter-Revolutionary Front	CEDA	Julio Moreno Dávila	148,161
Counter-Revolutionary Front	CEDA	Ramón Ruiz Alonso	148,074
Counter-Revolutionary Front	PRP	Gonzalo Muñoz Ruiz	147,889
Counter-Revolutionary Front	CEDA	Francisco Herrera Oria	147,792
Counter-Revolutionary Front	PCD	Melchor Almagro y San Martín	147,219
Counter-Revolutionary Front	CT	José María Arauz de Robles	145,934
Popular Front	UR	Emilio Martínez Jerez	100,013
Popular Front	PSOE	Fernando de los Ríos Urruti	99,749
Popular Front	IR	José Palanco Romero	99,005
Popular Front	UR	Ricardo Corro Moncho	98,110
Popular Front	PSOE	Ramón Lamoneda Fernández	97,770
Popular Front	IR	Miguel Rodríguez Molina	97,677
Popular Front	PSOE	Ernesto Fernández Jiménez	97,302
Popular Front	PSOE	Antonio Martín García	97,237
Popular Front	PSOE	Francisco Menoyo Baños	97,161
Popular Front	PSOE	Francisco de Toro Cuevas	96,702

Repeated elections on 3 May

Alliance	Party	Candidate	Votes
Popular Front (for the Majority)	PSOE	Fernando de los Ríos Urruti	224,498
Popular Front (for the Majority)	PSOE	Ernesto Fernández Jiménez	219,050
Popular Front (for the Majority)	PSOE	Ramón Lamoneda Fernández	218,049
Popular Front (for the Majority)	PSOE	Francisco Menoyo Caños	212,884
Popular Front (for the Majority)	PSOE	Nicolás Jiménez Molina	208,898
Popular Front (for the Majority)	PSOE	Aurelio Almagro Gracia	207,215
Popular Front (for the Majority)	IR	José Palanco Romero	206,646
Popular Front (for the Majority)	PSOE	Antonio Martín García	201,433
Popular Front (for the Majority)	IR	Miguel Rodríguez Molina	182,120
Popular Front (for the Minority)	PSOE	Anastasio de Gracia Villarrubia	142,645
Popular Front (for the Minority)	UR	Ricardo Corro Moncho	139,855
Popular Front (for the Minority)	PSOE	Francisco del Toro Cuevas	137,557
Popular Front (for the Minority)	PCE	Antonio Pretel Fernández	95,945
Popular Front (for the Minority)	IR	Aniceto León Garre	61,114
Popular Front (for the Minority)	UR	José Villoslada Ruíz	5,094
Sindicalist	PSind	José Alcántara García	44,928
Sindicalist	IRS	Eduardo Ortega y Gasset	12,219
Sindicalist	PRDF	Eduardo Barriobero y Herrán	10,390
Sindicalist	Ind	Mariano Sánchez Roca	8,678
-	?	José Leyva Martínez	4,468
Right-Wing Block	FE-JONS	José Antonio Primo de Rivera	Retired
Right-Wing Block	FE-JONS	Julio Ruiz de Alda	Retired
Right-Wing Block	FE-JONS	Santiago Cardell Pujalte	Retired
Right-Wing Block	FE-JONS	Rafael Sánchez Mazas	Retired
Right-Wing Block	CEDA	Ramón Ruiz Alonso	Retired
Right-Wing Block	CEDA	José María Pérez Laborda	Retired
Right-Wing Block	CEDA	Julio Moreno Dávila	Retired
Right-Wing Block	CEDA	Luís García Lix	Retired
Right-Wing Block	CEDA	Unknown Candidate	Retired
Right-Wing Block	Ind	Pascual Nácher y Vilar	Retired

=== Almería ===
7 seats, 5 votes per citizen

Alliance	Party	Candidate	Votes
Popular Front	IR	Augusto Barcia y Trelles	68,157
Popular Front	PSOE	Gabriel Pradal Gómez	64,699
Popular Front	PSOE	Benigno Ferrer Domingo	64,530
Popular Front	IR	Juan Company Jiménez	63,867
Popular Front	UR	Álvaro Pascual Leone	63,093
Right-Wing List	CEDA	Luis Jiménez Canga-Argüelles	57,771
Right-Wing List	CEDA	Lorenzo Gallardo Gallardo	57,346
Right-Wing List	CEDA	Luis Belda y Soriano	55,332
Right-Wing List	Ind	Emilio Muñoz Párraga	52,546
Right-Wing List	CT	Ricardo Rada Peral	49,623
Centrist	PCD	Tomás Elorrieta y Artaza	23,043
Conservative	PRC	Rogelio Pérez Burgos	3,831
Independent Republican	Ind	Francisco Vega de la Iglesia	1,388

=== Ceuta ===
1 seat

Party	Candidate	Votes
PSOE	Manuel Martínez Pedroso	7,998
PRR	Carlos Echeguren Ocio	3,243

=== Melilla ===
1 seat

Party	Candidate	Votes
UR	Luis Barrena y Alonso de Ojeda	12,761
PRR	Carlos Echeguren Ocio (Note: Supported by the Femenine Section of Popular Action (CEDA))	4,830
CEDA	Emilio Hermida Rodríguez	Retired

== Canary Islands ==
Seat distribution in the Congress of Deputies
Electoral List	Political Party	Seats
Popular Front	Spanish Socialist Workers' Party (PSOE)	3 / 11
Popular Front	Communist Party of Spain (PCE)	2 / 11
Popular Front	Republican Left (IR)	1 / 11
Popular Front	Republican Union (UR)	1 / 11
Popular Front	Federal Democratic Republican Party (PRDF)	1 / 11
Total Popular Front		8 / 11
Other Centrist List	Radical Republican Party (PRR)	1 / 11
Total Centre		1 / 11
CEDA-led Centre-Right Coalition	Spanish Confederation of Autonomous Right-Wing Groups (CEDA)	1 / 11
CEDA-led Centre-Right Coalition	Party of the Democratic Centre (PCD)	1 / 11
Total Right-Wing		2 / 11

=== Las Palmas de Gran Canaria ===
Only the results from the elected candidates are complete, the results for the other candidates corresponds to largely incomplete (~12% missing) results published on 18 February 1936

5 seats, 4 votes per citizen

Alliance	Party	Candidate	Votes
Popular Front	PRDF	Bernardino Valle y Gracia	32,900
Popular Front	PSOE	José Antonio Junco Toral	32,076
Popular Front	PSOE	Juan Negrín López	32,002
Popular Front	PCE	Eduardo Suárez Morales	30,576
Agrarian-Radical Coalition	PRR	Rafael Guerra del Río	31,641
Agrarian-Radical Coalition	PAE	José Mesa y López	26,631
Agrarian-Radical Coalition	Ind	Antonio Betancort Suárez	25,351
Agrarian-Radical Coalition	PAE	Ruperto González Negrín	24,074
Popular Action	CEDA	Agustín Mirando Junco	16,934
Popular Action	CEDA	José María Gil-Robles	14,787
Popular Action	CEDA	Juan Fontán y Lobé	13,333
Popular Action	CEDA	Leonardo I.González Armas	10,725

=== Santa Cruz de Tenerife ===
6 seats, 4 votes per citizen

Alliance	Party	Candidate	Votes
Right-Wing Coalition	CEDA	José Víctor López de Vergara	39,455
Right-Wing Coalition	CEDA	Emilio Ramón González de Mesa (Note: Disqualified due to legal incapacity on March 26)	36,661
Right-Wing Coalition	PCD	Félix Benítez de Lugo	33,643
Right-Wing Coalition	CEDA	José Miguel de Sotomayor	32,700
Popular Front	IR	Luis Rodríguez Figueroa	38,533
Popular Front	PSOE	Emiliano Díaz Castro	36,837
Popular Front	UR	Elfidio Alonso Rodríguez	35,338
Popular Front	PCE	Florencio Sosa Acevedo	33,950
Tinerfeño Republicans	PRT-PRR	Andrés Orozco Batista	19,223
Tinerfeño Republicans	PRT-PRR	Ángel Capote Rodríguez	17,521
Tinerfeño Republicans	PRT-PRR	Alonso Pérez Díaz	11,327
Tinerfeño Republicans	PRT-PRR	Emilio López González	7,788
Agrarian Independent	Ind/PAE	Luís Benítez de Lugo	4,486

== Bibliography ==
- Germán Zubero, Luis (2019). Elecciones y Partidos Políticos en Aragón durante la Segunda República. Estructura Económica y Comportamiento Político (PDF). Universidad de Zaragoza. Archived from the original (PDF) on 5 September 2025.
- Oliver Araujo, Joan (1986). "Las Elecciones del Frente Popular en Baleares" (PDF). Cuadernos de la Facultad de Derecho (in Spanish) (13). Universitat de les Illes Balears.
- López Villaverde, Ángel Luis (2020). "Las botas sobre los votos. Las elecciones en Cuenca como decantador del liderazgo de la trama golpista de 1936". Alcores (in Spanish) (24): 285–306. ISSN 1886-8770.
- Vilanova, Mercedes (2006). Atles electoral de la Segona República a Catalunya. Volum 1, circumscripcions, comarques i municipis (PDF). Enciclopèdia Catalana. Archived from the original (PDF) on 5 September 2025.
- Martínez Leal, Juan (2012). "Las elecciones del Frente Popular en la provincia de Alicante" (PDF). Pasado y Memoria. Revista de Historia Contemporánea (in Spanish) (11). Alicante, España: Universidad de Alicante: 205–238. doi:10.14198/PASADO2012.11.10. ISSN 1579-3311.
- Velasco Gómez, José (1983). "Las elecciones del Frente Popular en Málaga, 1936" (PDF). Baetica. Estudios de Arte, Geografía e Historia (in Spanish). 6. Málaga, España: Facultad de Filosofía y Letras, Universidad de Málaga: 467–493. ISSN 0212-5099.
- Requena Gallego, Manuel (1982). "Las elecciones del Frente Popular en Albacete". Al-Basit: Revista de estudios albacetenses (in Spanish) (11): 27–72. ISSN 0212-8632.
- Alías Rodríguez, Juana (1985). "Melilla en el período comprendido entre febrero y julio de 1936". Aldaba: Revista del Centro Asociado a la UNED de Melilla (in Spanish) (5): 75–82. doi:10.5944/aldaba.5.1985.19610. ISSN 0213-7925.
- Álvarez Rey, Leandro; Ruiz Sánchez, José Leonardo (1990). "Huelva durante la Segunda República: partidos, elecciones y comportamiento político (1931–1936)". Huelva en su Historia (in Spanish). 3 (2): 603–670. doi:10.33776/hh.v3i2.808 (inactive 2 June 2026).
- Gómez Salvago, José (1977). La Segunda República: elecciones en Sevilla y su provincia. Departamento de Derecho Constitucional (Doctoral thesis thesis) (in Spanish). Universidad de Sevilla. hdl:11441/98069.
- Ayala Vicente, Fernando (2000). La II República en la provincia de Cáceres. Elecciones y partidos políticos (Doctoral thesis thesis) (in Spanish). Universidad de Extremadura. hdl:10662/12271.
- López Martínez, Mario (1992). Elecciones, caciques y campesinos en Granada durante la II República (1931–1936). Orden público y control social. Facultad de Filosofía y Letras (Doctoral thesis thesis) (in Spanish). Universidad de Granada.
- Barrio Gozalo, Maximiliano (1988). "Aproximación a las elecciones y a los partidos políticos en Segovia durante la Segunda República, 1931–1936". Investigaciones Históricas: Época Moderna y Contemporánea (in Spanish) (8): 259–288. ISSN 0210-9425.
- Arrabal López, Francisco (1997). "Aproximación a las elecciones de la Segunda República en Ávila" (PDF). Cuadernos Abulenses (in Spanish) (26): 11–102. ISSN 0213-0475.
- Marcos del Olmo, María de la Concepción (1987). "La Segunda República en Palencia: antecedentes de una sublevación". Investigaciones Históricas: Época Moderna y Contemporánea (in Spanish) (7): 237–268. ISSN 0210-9425.
- Martínez Celada, José Luis (1998). "Las elecciones de febrero de 1936 en la provincia de León". Estudios Humanísticos. Geografía, Historia y Arte (in Spanish) (20): 137–160. ISSN 0213-1390.
