= Independent Radical Socialist Republican Party =

Spanish political party

Independent Radical Socialist Republican Party Partido Republicano Radical Socialista Independiente
- Leader: Marcelino Domingo
- Founded: 24 September 1933
- Dissolved: 3 April 1934
- Split from: Radical Socialist Republican Party
- Merged into: Republican Left
- Ideology: Republicanism; Radicalism; Anti-clericalism; Social democracy
- Political position: Left-wing
- Colors: Red, yellow and murrey

The Independent Radical Socialist Republican Party (PRRSI; Spanish: Partido Republicano Radical Socialista Independiente) was a minor Spanish radical political party, created in 1929 after the split of the left-wing of the Radical Socialist Republican Party. Its main leaders were Marcelino Domingo, Álvaro de Albornoz and Ángel Galarza.

== History ==
In 1933, the Radical Socialist Republican Party (PRRS), established in 1929 by a left-wing split from the Radical Republican Party (PRR) of Alejandro Lerroux, was suffering from internal divisions. The most leftist factions, led by Marcelino Domingo and Álvaro de Albornoz, were in favour of maintaining an alliance with the Spanish Socialist Workers' Party (PSOE), whereas the most conservative groups, led by Félix Gordón Ordás, preferred to re-establish an alliance with Lerroux's PRR.

On 24 September 1933, while the PRRS was undergoing its 3rd national congress, the leftists left the party and established the PRRSI: the split attracted three of the PRRS's founders (Domingo, Alboronz and Galarza), alongside 26 deputies and several important members, such as Francisco Barnés Salinas and Victoria Kent. An important PRRSI group was established in Alicante, under the leadership of José Alonso Mallol.

The PRRSI only received 0,6% of the votes in the 1933 Spanish general election, only electing three deputies. In the Congress of Deputies, the party established a joint group with the Republican Action and the Autonomous Galician Republican Organisation. On 3 April 1934, the three parties merged into the Republican Left.

== See also ==
- Republican Left
- Radical Socialist Republican Party
