= Republican Left (Spain) =

Spanish political party

Republican Left Izquierda Republicana
- Leader: Manuel Azaña
- Founded: 1934
- Dissolved: 1959
- Merger of: AR; PRRSI; ORGA
- Headquarters: Madrid (1934–1939); Mexico City (1939–1946); Paris (1946–1959)
- Newspaper: Política
- Ideology: Republicanism; Anti-clericalism; Anti-fascism; Social liberalism Social democracy Radicalism
- Political position: Centre-left
- National affiliation: Popular Front (1936–39)
- Colors: Red, yellow and murrey
- Congress of Deputies (1936): 88 / 473

The Republican Left (Spanish: Izquierda Republicana) was a Spanish republican party founded in 1934.

== History ==
The party was founded in 1934 following the left's defeat in the 1933 election, by the merger of Manuel Azaña's Republican Action, part of Marcelino Domingo's Independent Radical Socialist Republican Party and Santiago Casares Quiroga's Autonomous Galician Republican Organization (ORGA). Its members included José Giral, Victoria Kent, and Manuel Azaña, who became the party's leader.

Integrated in the Popular Front ahead of the 1936 election. Azaña became President of the Council of Ministers. Following the impeachment of Niceto Alcalá Zamora from the presidency in May 1936, Azaña was elected President, an office he held until his resignation in February 1939. He was succeeded as President of the Council first by Casares Quiroga] and then by Giral. Later, alongside the Republican Union, the party was the main component of the Largo Caballero government in September 1936, at the start of the Spanish Civil War. The IR participated in all republican governments till the end of the civil war.

In exile in Mexico, the IR was the main support of the Republican government-in-exile until it was dissolved in 1959 to found the Spanish Democratic Republican Action. A party taking the name Republican Left was founded in 1977 and has achieved no major electoral success yet.

== Notable members ==
- Ramón Bengaray Zabalza
- Santiago Casares Quiroga
- José Giral
- Victoria Kent
- Manuel Azaña

== See also ==
- Liberalism and radicalism in Spain
