= Ramón Bengaray Zabalza =

Spanish politician (1896–1936)

Ramón Bengaray Zabalza (February 2, 1896 – 1936) was a Spanish politician.
