= Second biennium of the Second Spanish Republic =

Period of the Second Spanish Republic (1933–1936)

Flag of the Second Spanish Republic

The Second biennium of the Second Spanish Republic, also called the Radical-Cedist Biennium, rectifying biennium, conservative biennium, counter-reformist biennium, and black biennium or the biennium of terror by the left, constitutes the period of the Second Spanish Republic between the general elections of November 1933 and those of February 1936 during which the centre-right republican parties led by the Radical Republican Party of Alejandro Lerroux governed, allied with the Catholic right of the CEDA and the Agrarian Party, first from Parliament and then participating in the government. Precisely, the entry of the CEDA into the Government in October 1934 triggered the most important event of the period: the Revolution of 1934, a failed socialist insurrection that only consolidated in Asturias for two weeks (the only place where the CNT also participated), although the Revolution of Asturias was finally also crushed by the intervention of the army.

Unlike the relative political stability of the first biennium (with the two governments of Manuel Azaña), the second was a period in which the cabinets presided over by the Radical Republican Party had an average life of three months (eight governments were formed in two years) and three different presidents alternated (Alejandro Lerroux, Ricardo Samper and Joaquín Chapaprieta), and the last two governments of the biennium, those presided over by the centrist Manuel Portela, lasted even less. The ultimate reason for the governmental instability of the period is found in the fact that the coalition between the republican centre-right, represented by the Radical Republican Party, and the Catholic "possibilist" right, embodied in the CEDA, "was never a genuine agreed coalition" (hence it lacked coherence and mutual loyalty), to which must be added the "deadly continuous intervention of the Head of State" Niceto Alcalá-Zamora. Radicals and Cedists "agreed on the need to revise the legislation of the first biennium in some aspects, especially in what they called "socializing" (that is, social democratic), but they did not agree on determining to what degree certain laws should be changed."

For a long time, the dominant view of the second biennium has been that of a regressive and reactionary period, hence the widespread denomination of "black biennium", in contrast to the achievements of the first, the "reformist" or "modernizing" biennium. In this sense, the second biennium would have been the negation of the first, its antithesis. Nowadays, however, this view has been questioned and some historians, such as Nigel Townson, consider it a myth, at least with regard to the period before the "Revolution of October 1934". The radical governments up to that date did not halt or destroy the reforms of the first biennium, that is, they were not "mere puppets of the right; on the contrary, they cultivated their own project, in an attempt to forge a more inclusive and conciliatory regime. In short, it was a period of rectification, not reaction," Townson has stated, although according to Eduardo González Calleja and other historians, the radicals: "failed to impose their criteria in general terms" and were not "capable of approving truly alternative new laws." In contrast, there is no such consensus in the assessment of the period after "October", with the coalition governments of the radicals and the CEDA. It is a matter of debate whether this time did constitute a "black biennium". Townson considers that despite the "crisis of credibility of the centre and the repression of the left" it was not "a period of open reaction", as would be demonstrated by the fact that "the Republican-Radicals and the Cedists were always in disagreement on two fundamental issues: the magnitude of the counter-reform and the scale of repression", although he acknowledges that "left-wing sympathisers were persecuted and demonised." The historian Fernando del Rey Reguillo does admit that the concept of "black biennium" can be applied to this second stage, after stating that it is "inappropriate" to apply it to the entire biennium. González Calleja and other historians consider it "the quintessential counter-reformist stage of the biennium."

Regarding the final balance of the biennium, the historian Luis Palacios Bañuelos considers that it constituted the failure of the "experiment of a right-wing Republic" and that "the most serious thing was that it caused an ever greater fracture among Spaniards."

== Elections of November 1933 ==
At the beginning of September 1933, the President of the Republic Niceto Alcalá-Zamora withdrew his confidence from the Prime Minister Manuel Azaña, who was forced to resign (although he had just won a vote of no confidence in the Cortes). Since October 1931, Azaña had presided over a republican-socialist cabinet that had undertaken a broad programme of reforms during the two years it had been in power, but which since the beginning of the year, after the "Casas Viejas events", had suffered enormous wear and tear that had called into question the continuity of the coalition of left republicans with the Spanish Socialist Workers' Party (PSOE). Alcalá Zamora entrusted the formation of an exclusively republican government to Alejandro Lerroux, leader of the centre-right Radical Republican Party (PRR) and main opponent of the "socialist-Azañist" government, but it lasted only three weeks because he was defeated in the Cortes when a "motion of no confidence" presented by the socialists was approved (by 187 votes in favour, from the socialists and left republicans, and 91 against). After a round of consultations on 7 October, Alcalá-Zamora appointed Diego Martínez Barrio (also of the PRR) as the new prime minister, and at the same time dissolved the Cortes and called elections. The President of the Republic was convinced that the Cortes elected in June 1931 no longer represented the dominant public opinion at that time after the strong reactions and tensions experienced in Spain as a result of the reformist policy of Azaña's republican-socialist government. For this reason he sought "definitive orientation and harmony, resorting to the direct consultation of the general will", as stated in the preamble of the decree calling the elections.

The new electoral law approved on 27 July 1933 introduced some changes compared to the one applied in the constituent elections of June 1931: the percentage of votes required for a candidacy to win in the first round was raised to 40%, while in the second, which would be held if no candidate reached that figure, only those who had achieved 8% of the votes could participate. It also made it possible to change the composition of the candidacies between the first and second rounds. But the essence was maintained: it was a majoritarian electoral system of open lists that rewarded the candidacies that obtained the most votes, so parties that managed to stand in coalition obtained a greater number of deputies than if they stood alone.

However, the main novelty of these elections was that for the first time women were able to exercise their right to vote recognized in the Constitution of 1931 in a general election. Nearly seven million were called to the polls. Therefore, during the electoral campaign all parties addressed themselves especially to them. A proclamation of the right-wing candidacy for Córdoba stated: "Do not forget that you are going to defend your rights as a mother, as a wife... [and that] with your vote you are going to serve your God and your country."

=== Parties ===
Logo of the Spanish Confederation of Autonomous Right-wing Groups (CEDA).

Unlike the constituent elections of June 1931, the non-republican right formed an electoral coalition that was formalised on 12 October 1933 under the name Union of the Right and the Agrarians, which included the CEDA, as the hegemonic party, the Agrarian Party (committed to the defence of "religion, education, the interests of the countryside" and to "avoid the cruel dismemberment of Catalonia", although it was not formally constituted until January 1934, being forced to accept the Republic to be legalised), the "Alfonsine" monarchists of Spanish Renovation and the Carlist Traditionalist Communion (which due to their anti-parliamentarianism can be placed on the far-right), as well as some independent "agrarians and Catholics". Despite their ideological and tactical differences, they managed to elaborate a minimum programme consisting of three points and embodying the three axes around which their policy of opposition to the governments of Manuel Azaña during the first biennium had revolved "in defence of order and religion": revision of the Constitution of 1931 and the reformist legislation, especially social and religious; abolition of the Agrarian Reform Law of 1932; and declare an amnesty for "political crimes", which meant releasing from prison all those convicted for the attempted coup d'état of August 1932 led by General José Sanjurjo.

During the campaign, the CEDA, which presented the elections as a plebiscite on the nature of the republican regime, made a great propaganda deployment thanks to the funding it obtained far above the rest of the parties contesting the elections. In the manifesto of the "Anti-Marxist Coalition" (the name adopted by the non-republican right-wing candidacy for the Madrid constituency), published by the Catholic daily El Debate on 1 November, the policy applied by the republican-socialist governments of the first biennium was defined as "Marxist", with its "materialistic and anti-Catholic conception of life and society" and its "anti-Spanishness", therefore

The candidates of the anti-Marxist coalition will resolutely and at all costs defend the need for an immediate repeal, by whatever means appropriate in each case, of the precepts, both constitutional and legal, inspired by secularising and socialising designs […]. They will work tirelessly to achieve the cancellation of all provisions confiscating property and persecuting persons, associations and religious beliefs.

— El Debate, 1 November 1933.

Regarding the leader of the CEDA, José María Gil Robles, the speech he gave on 15 October at the Monumental Cinema in Madrid has been highlighted, following his visit to Nazi Germany the previous month during which he witnessed the first Nuremberg Rally of the Nazi Party in power, and in which he advocated giving Spain a "totalitarian" policy:

We have to give Spain a true unity, a new spirit, a totalitarian policy... We have to found a new State, clean the country of Judaizing Freemasons... We need all the power and that is what we ask for. [...] To fulfil this ideal we are not going to waste time with archaic forms. Democracy is not an end, but a means to the conquest of a new State. When the time comes, either Parliament submits or we make it disappear... Stand up all for the fight! We are mobilised, we will not lay down our arms until we have the final victory in our hands.

— José María Gil Robles (1933).

For its part, the Radical Republican Party of Alejandro Lerroux, which had led the opposition to the governments of Manuel Azaña during the year 1933, hoped to reap the fruits of it and presented itself as a centrist option, summed up in the slogan "Republic, order, liberty, social justice, amnesty." To this end, it pacted with other centre-right republican groups (the Liberal Democratic Republican Party of Melquiades Álvarez and the Progressive Republican Party, the party of the President of the Republic, Niceto Alcalá-Zamora) and with the CEDA and the Agrarian Party in the constituencies where a second round was necessary.

Logo of the Spanish Socialist Workers' Party (PSOE).

In contrast, the left republicans and the socialists, who had stood in coalition in the 1931 constituent elections, now did so separately. In the Spanish Socialist Workers' Party (PSOE), the position of completely breaking relations with the republicans prevailed. During the electoral campaign, Largo Caballero, who had become the leader best embodying the new orientation of the socialists, reiterated that "the Socialist Party is going to conquer power":

It is not enough for the emancipation of the working class to have a bourgeois republic... Let it be clear: the Socialist Party is going to conquer power, and it is going to conquer it, as I say, legally if it can be. We wish it could be legally, according to the Constitution, and if not, as we can. And, when that happens, it will govern as circumstances and the conditions of the country allow. What I confess is that if the battle is won it will not be to hand over power to the enemy.

— Largo Caballero (1933).

Thus, "the electoral landscape is just the opposite of that of the 1931 elections, for the right are now the ones who appear united against the disunity of the left and the republicans." For its part, the CNT deployed an unprecedented campaign in favour of abstention, with insults to the "electoral animal" included and with disqualifications of right and left: "Vultures, red and yellow, and tricolour vultures. All vultures. All, birds of prey. All, filthy scum that the producing people will sweep away with the broom of the revolution." Their alternative was insurrection if "fascist tendencies" won and to establish libertarian communism.

=== Results ===
Map of the results of the 1933 Spanish general election by electoral constituencies (provinces and large cities). The right in dark blue; the centre-right in light blue; the centre in green; and the left in red.

The result of the elections of November 1933 —"the first acceptably clean elections in Spanish history," according to historian William Irwin, cited by Nigel Townson— was the defeat of the left republicans and the socialists and the triumph of the right and the centre-right, fundamentally because the parties of that tendency stood united forming coalitions, while the left stood divided. The non-republican right coalition obtained around two hundred deputies (of which one hundred and fifteen were from the CEDA, thirty from the Agrarians, twenty from the Traditionalists, fourteen from the Alfonsines of Spanish Renovation and eighteen right-wing independents, plus two fascists, one from Falange and another from the Spanish Nationalist Party), while the centre-right and centre obtained about one hundred and seventy deputies (one hundred and two from the Radical Republican Party, nine from the Liberal Democrats, and three from the Progressives; eleven from the PNV; twenty-four from the Lliga; Republican Galician Party, six; Republican Conservative Party, seventeen) and the left saw its representation reduced to barely a hundred parliamentarians (fifty-nine from the PSOE; seventeen from ERC; Socialist Union of Catalonia, three; Republican Action, five; Federal Democrats, four; Independent Radical Socialist Republican Party, three). There had been a spectacular swing compared to the Constituent Cortes, although parliament was again very atomised and pacts were necessary to ensure governability.

As the historian Santos Juliá has pointed out, "the result of the elections was a spectacular realignment of the party system, a good indication of how far the Republic still was from being a consolidated democracy." The most notable change was the irruption on the parliamentary scene of the CEDA, the Catholic "accidentalist" right that had not declared its loyalty to the Republic and became the largest minority in the Cortes. Other parties of the right or centre-right (Agrarians, Conservatives, Lliga, Progressives and Liberal Democrats) obtained acceptable results, becoming essential pieces for the formation of a government. The other transcendental change for the party system was the undeniable defeat of the republican left and the harsh punishment suffered by the socialists, who had stood alone in the elections with the aspiration of obtaining a sufficient majority to allow them to govern and peacefully transform the "bourgeois" republic into a "socialist republic". Finally, the central position was occupied by the Radical Party.

Some historians have interpreted the "electoral swing" of November 1933 as "a plebiscite on the Constitution itself and the way the left had applied it." Others have questioned this interpretation, arguing that the Radical Republican Party, the other great winner, along with the CEDA, of the elections, had approved the Constitution and the laws that developed it.

Rather, a good part of the centrist and middle-class republican vote, which the radicals capitalised on thanks to the division and weakness of their centre-left rivals, probably focused on maintaining that programme [of the first biennium] but without the socialists and without a good part of their labour reforms, if not all, which were rejected by many entrepreneurs, agrarians and industrialists, large and small. [...] Therefore, it seems rather that the elections of November 1933 were conceived as a massive plebiscite, not against the programme of the first biennium or against secularism, but against the socialists (who ran alone) and Largo Caballero's reform.

— Eduardo González Calleja and others (2015).

Luis Palacios Bañuelos coincides with this latter interpretation, considering that they meant "a disavowal for those who had been governing, but not an anti-republican affirmation."

There has been discussion about the extent to which the triumph of the right and centre-right in the elections of November 1933 was due to the women's vote, supposedly heavily influenced by the Catholic Church, and to the CNT's abstentionist campaign, which would have cost votes to left-wing parties.

The historian Julián Casanova has dismissed these two causes: "Women also voted in 1936, and many of them for the CEDA and right-wing parties, and yet the left-wing parties won," he notes regarding the first question, with which other historians concur using the same argument.

As for the second, according to Casanova:

Abstention was especially noticeable in cities like Seville, Barcelona, Cádiz or Zaragoza, where the anarchists had a greater presence. But research on Catalonia, the place with the strongest roots of revolutionary syndicalism (of the CNT), has shown that abstentionist electoral behaviour for ideological reasons, that is, due to anarchist propaganda, would be restricted to minority sectors of the working class.

— Julian Casanova (2007).

For their part, González Calleja and other historians consider that:

Anarchist abstention and its hostility towards republicans and socialists was more decisive [than the female vote], as abstention was greater than in 1931 and 1936, and in some areas it was considerable: in Cádiz, Seville capital and province, Barcelona capital, Zaragoza capital and Málaga province the right won, while in Málaga capital the PSOE needed a second round.

— Eduardo González Calleja and others (2015).

An assessment shared by Ángel Luis López Villaverde, who states that "anarchist abstention played its part, especially in the districts where anarcho-syndicalism was hegemonic in the workers' movement." What historians do agree on is that the fundamental cause of the defeat of the left and the triumph of the right was that the former stood disunited and the latter united, the complete opposite of what had happened in the 1931 elections.

For his part, Rey Reguillo in his study on the province of Ciudad Real during the Second Republic has concluded that:

The decisive factor in the victory of the centre-right was the intense mobilisation led by the middle classes and Catholics from at least the second half of 1932. A mobilisation that did not simply respond to the interests of the land oligarchies, but above all served as a counterpoint to the onerous costs incurred by those sectors due to the policy of the republican-socialist governments. This mobilisation —plural in its terms— was swelled by the agrarian Catholics of the CEDA, of course, but also, and no less importantly, by the Radical Party and the landowners through their powerful corporate organisations, although each sector acted on its own and without prior coordination. Not forgetting the dissonant voices maintained by the dissident left republicans who deserted the socialist-Azañist front.

— Fernando del Rey Reguillo (2012).

However, González Calleja and other historians have pointed out that "clientelism, the powers of local notables, who had a lot at stake, and the bribes and alms among potential voters" did not cease to operate, practices that paradoxically would have been favoured, especially in rural areas, by "the inhibition or inoperativeness of the Executive," of which Alejandro Lerroux himself complained.

=== Attempts by the left to prevent the centre-right from governing ===
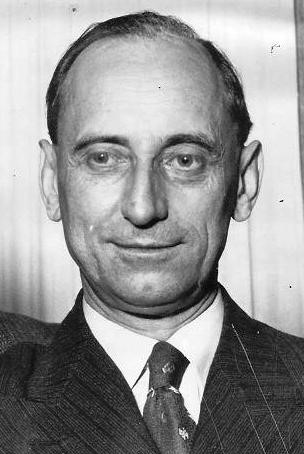
Santiago Casares Quiroga was one of the left republicans who pressured Prime Minister Diego Martínez Barrio to prevent the centre-right from governing.

As soon as the triumph of the centre and the right in the elections became known, the left republicans and socialists tried to get the President of the Republic to call new elections before the new Cortes could be constituted. The initiative was taken by Manuel Azaña, who had presided over the republican-socialist governments of the first biennium. On 4 December he met with the head of government Diego Martínez Barrio to whom he proposed forming a left republican government to preside over new elections. Faced with his negative response, two days later he sent him a letter, also signed by the left republicans Marcelino Domingo and Santiago Casares Quiroga who had been ministers in his governments, in which they reiterated the demand to form a government of "revolutionary guarantee" and in which they made a threatening allusion: "We earnestly wish that... our points of view are accepted, thereby avoiding subsequent resolutions, guided in any case by what the highest interests of the country demand." Martínez Barrio again refused and replied not without a certain irony: "I would like to spare you the subsequent resolutions you have announced to me." The socialists, through Juan Negrín, made the same request, this time directly to the President of the Republic Niceto Alcalá Zamora, who also firmly opposed violating the Constitution and invalidating the election result.

At a rally held in Barcelona in January 1934, when the new Cortes had already met and they had invested the Radical government of Alejandro Lerroux thanks to the votes of Gil Robles' CEDA, Manuel Azaña denounced the fact that those who had presented themselves to the electorate "with principles destructive of the essence of the [republican] regime" had "the pretension and audacity to want to govern the Republic," warning next that the Constitution and Parliament had not been created "to hand over the [democratic] regime to its own enemies." Thus, according to the Italian historian Gabriele Ranzato, Azaña's attempt to prevent the election winners from acceding to the government was not only due to the disappointment of having lost power, but above all to the concern "that the one who would sink democracy 'by democratic means' would be Gil Robles."

Ranzato considers that the attempt by the left to prevent the centre-right from acceding to power after having won the general elections started the series of events that precipitated Spain into the civil war. The problem was that the left republicans, led by Manuel Azaña, conceived the Republic not only as a democratic political regime, but as their own political project that had triumphed thanks to a "revolution," for that was how they understood what had happened on 14 April 1931 —and not as the result of "a diffuse will to overthrow the monarchy and of a democratic change, but not of a revolution," Ranzato points out—. Before the elections, Azaña had said in the Cortes that "the Republic is not only a regime; it is an instrument for action" and that the purpose of his governments had been "to maintain that spirit of revolution... against corruption, against decadence, against the discredit of Spain." Thus, concludes Ranzato, those who had brought the Republic did not want to accept that it now be governed by its "enemies," although in reality what had happened was that the majority of voters had rejected the reforms carried out by the republican-socialist governments presided over by Azaña during the first biennium, or at least part of them.

Azaña maintained this position in the following months, thus contributing to the "climate of tension" and the "mental predisposition" that led to the Revolution of October 1934. In the closing speech of his party's youth organisation he said:

We are slowly placing ourselves against this Republic that has just lost its last considerations of moral order and moral authority; we are going to place ourselves in the same state of mind in which we were against the Spanish regime in 1930. If they push us... ah!, let them not complain.

— Manuel Azaña (1934).

For his part, José Luis Martín Ramos downplays the significance of the attempt by the left republicans, with Azaña at the head, to subvert the election result. He simply says that it was "a nonsense that led nowhere" since repeating the elections did not at all ensure that the left could win due to the breakdown of the republican-socialist coalition that had governed during the first biennium.

In June 1934, seven months after the formation of the Radical Republican Party government with the support of the CEDA, the left republicans again tried to get President Alcalá Zamora to dissolve the Cortes and appoint a minority left government to preside over new elections. The person in charge of presenting the proposal to Alcalá Zamora was his former party colleague Miguel Maura. Failing to achieve their objective, they commissioned Diego Martínez Barrio, who had left Lerroux's party, to speak with Alcalá Zamora with the aim that he appoint a government of "national salvation" with full powers. Alcalá Zamora again refused and despite this the pressures on the President of the Republic continued. There was even an attempt to make public a manifesto with the request, which did not materialise because those in charge of its drafting (Azaña, Maura and Sánchez Román) could not agree on its content. And Azaña even sounded out the socialists to support his project, but Largo Caballero told him, according to Azaña, that "they had agreed not to collaborate with the republicans, neither for peace nor for war, because they are going to do the revolution alone...".

At the rally he held in Barcelona on 30 August, Azaña again insisted on his opposition to the Republic being governed by its "enemies":

If one day we were to see the Republic in the hands of the monarchists, more or less disguised, and to justify it I was alluded to a constitutional article, I would protest it, because it is inconceivable in the simplest political morality that a fundamental code of the Republic has been made to destroy it. Then... it would be time to think that having failed the path of order and reason, we would have to renounce the renewal of Spain, or we would have to conquer, with open hearts, the guarantees that the future would not become as dark again as it is currently.

— Manuel Azaña (1933).

=== Anarchist insurrection of December 1933 ===
Flag of the CNT-FAI that promoted and organised the anarchist insurrection of December 1933, which, like the previous two, was a complete failure.

As soon as the triumph of the right in the elections became known, a National Plenary of the CNT held in Zaragoza on 26 November (since the split of the treintistas, the National Plenary resided in that Aragonese city) decided to carry out an insurrection, the third in the history of the Republic, which, like the previous two (from the first biennium), also turned out to be a complete failure (they invited the socialists to participate, but they rejected the offer, since, among other reasons, they blamed the defeat of the left in the elections on the CNT's abstentionist campaign). The Zaragoza Plenary produced a revolutionary committee in charge of organising it and made up, among others, of Buenaventura Durruti, Cipriano Mera, Antonio Ejarque, Isaac Puente and Joaquín Ascaso, almost all of them members of the FAI. On the same day the new Cortes opened, 8 December, the civil governor of Zaragoza ordered the closure of CNT premises as a precautionary measure and the deployment of public order forces on the streets, but that did not prevent that in the afternoon and during the following six days shootings and clashes between police and revolutionaries who wanted to establish libertarian communism spread in a city paralysed by the strike, twelve people dying on the first day alone. On the 14th, the State of War was declared and the Army intervened to restore order, while assault guards drove the trams, escorted by soldiers. On the 15th, the CNT gave the order to return to work and the following day the police arrested the revolutionary committee (Durruti was arrested shortly afterwards in Barcelona).

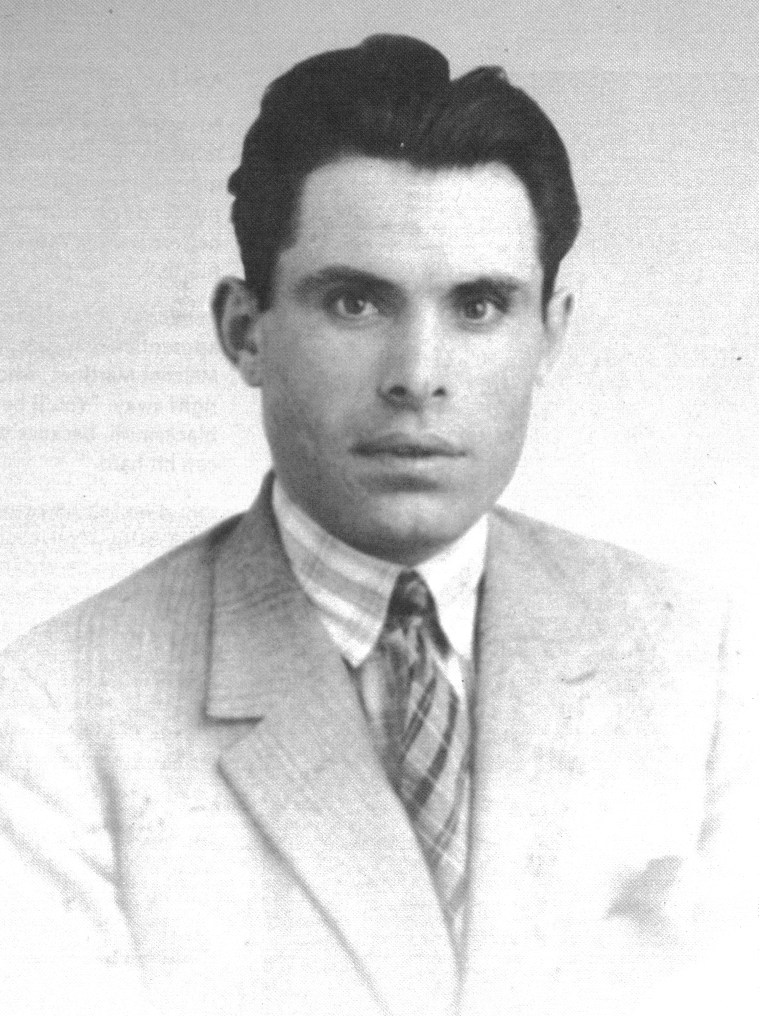
Buenaventura Durruti, member of the Revolutionary Committee that organised the anarchist insurrection of December 1933. He was arrested in Barcelona.

The insurrectionary movement started in Zaragoza, which like the previous two was carefully planned, but again coordination failed, spread to other towns in Aragon and La Rioja, and where libertarian communism was proclaimed, the most serious events occurred, all following a similar pattern: attempt to take over the Civil Guard barracks, arrest of the authorities and the "wealthy" people, burning of churches and property archives and official documents, supply of products "in accordance with the norms of libertarian communism". The response of the acting government presided over by Diego Martínez Barrio was always the same: harsh repression. There were also anarchist uprisings in isolated points of Extremadura, Andalusia, Catalonia, Valencia, Asturias and the mining basin of León, which by 15 December had been completely subdued.

The balance of the seven days of the anarchist insurrection of December 1933 was 75 dead and 101 wounded among the insurgents, and 11 Civil Guards and 3 assault guards dead and 45 and 18 wounded, respectively, among the public order forces. Those involved in the "December revolution," as some anarchists called it, were subject to the newly approved Public Order Law of 1933. For its part, the failure left the CNT broken and disarticulated, and without organs of expression. The more moderate trade union leaders who had been expelled from the CNT, such as Joan Peiró of the Libertarian Syndicalist Federation, blamed the disaster on the most radical faction of anarcho-syndicalism, the FAI, whose members had dominated the "revolutionary committee" of the insurrection. According to González Calleja and other historians, "the insurrection of 8 December 1933 [was] perhaps the most serious of the three carried out up to that point and from whose repression [the CNT members] emerged very damaged." In fact, "with the uprising of late 1933, the anarcho-syndicalist cycle of insurrections was closed, due to the virtual exhaustion of the confederal organisation."

In March of the following year, there was a four-week general strike in Zaragoza in protest against the harsh conditions and mistreatment they claimed the prisoners jailed after the insurrection were receiving.

== First radical governments (December 1933 – October 1934) ==
Between December 1933 and October 1934, three governments of the Radical Republican Party (PRR) succeeded one another, all supported in the Cortes by the CEDA (and by other minor parties such as the Agrarian Party and the Liberal Democratic Republican Party). The first, presided over by the PRR leader Alejandro Lerroux, remained in power from 19 December 1933 to 3 March 1934. The second, also headed by Lerroux, lasted only two months, until 28 April. The third, presided over by the also radical Ricardo Samper, was the longest-lasting, although it was only in power for five months (Samper was forced to resign on 4 October 1934 after the CEDA withdrew its parliamentary support, demanding to enter the Government with three ministers).

The main objective of the radical governments was to achieve, as Lerroux himself said, "a Republic for all Spaniards" by carrying out the "rectification" of the reforms of the first biennium, which would open the door to the incorporation of the Catholic "accidentalist" right of the CEDA into the republican institutions. During this period from December 1933 to October 1934, "moderation and pragmatism presided over the rectification of the norms of the first biennium. This was not an anti-republican policy, as the opposition denounced"; in fact:

...by the end of the summer of 1934, the radical-cedist collaboration had not led to the annulment of the main aspects that identified the Republic with left-wing policy. However, limited as they were, all the measures approved by the radical governments exasperated left-wing opinion and were held up as an example of the destruction of the 1931 Republic.

— Manuel Álvarez Tardío and Roberto Villa García (2017).

Also, for the opposite reasons, to its allies on the right.

Rey Reguillo has noted this in his study on the province of Ciudad Real. There:

...the policy of the centre republicans did not translate into the widespread expulsion of left-wing councillors from town councils... Some local corporations were remodelled by virtue of the correction of irregularities and abuses committed in municipal power during the previous period, especially by the socialists. Between November 1933 and October 1934, in the province of Ciudad Real there were changes in only fifteen town councils out of a total of 97, always following legal procedures... The civil governors set themselves the goal of re-establishing the rule of law, which had been considerably diminished at the local level in the previous biennium. One cannot speak of a systematic persecution of the socialists in the town councils —much less of the left republicans— before October 1934.

— Fernando del Rey Reguillo (2012).

And "in the labour field, the thesis of the systematic persecution of the workers' left by the centre republicans is also not sustained."

The thesis held by Álvarez Tardío and Villa García and Del Rey Reguillo that "moderation and pragmatism presided over the rectification of the norms of the first biennium" by the first three radical governments has been questioned by González Calleja and other historians who, after recognising that "the radicals and their governments were to a certain extent continuous with the work of the centrist liberal politicians who had preceded them," consider that they set out to "neutralise, if not marginalise or simply expel, the socialists and UGT members from the institutions, given that they had been the greatest defenders and promoters of [the social and labour reforms of the first biennium]." The replacement of socialist councils by centre-right or right-wing management commissions would have been carried out especially after the arrival at the Ministry of the Interior in March 1934 of the "tough" Rafael Salazar Alonso, a policy that intensified after the failed general agrarian strike of June, "on the grounds that it had been illegal." Furthermore, with Salazar Alonso at the Interior, "repressive and public order policies hardened very visibly" and the Civil Guard again functioned "as a militarised corps that performed its functions with great autonomy from civil power." The "very serious discussion" of the re-establishment of the death penalty for crimes of banditry and terrorism was even held.

=== Alliance of the radicals with the CEDA ===
Given the virtual disappearance of the republican left from the Cortes, the only option to form a stable government was for the two main minorities, the Radical Republican Party (102 deputies) and the CEDA (115 deputies), to reach some agreement, supported by smaller groups, such as the Agrarian Party (30 deputies), the Lliga (24) or the Liberal Democratic Republican Party (9 deputies), and thus reach the 237 deputies necessary to have a majority in the Cortes.

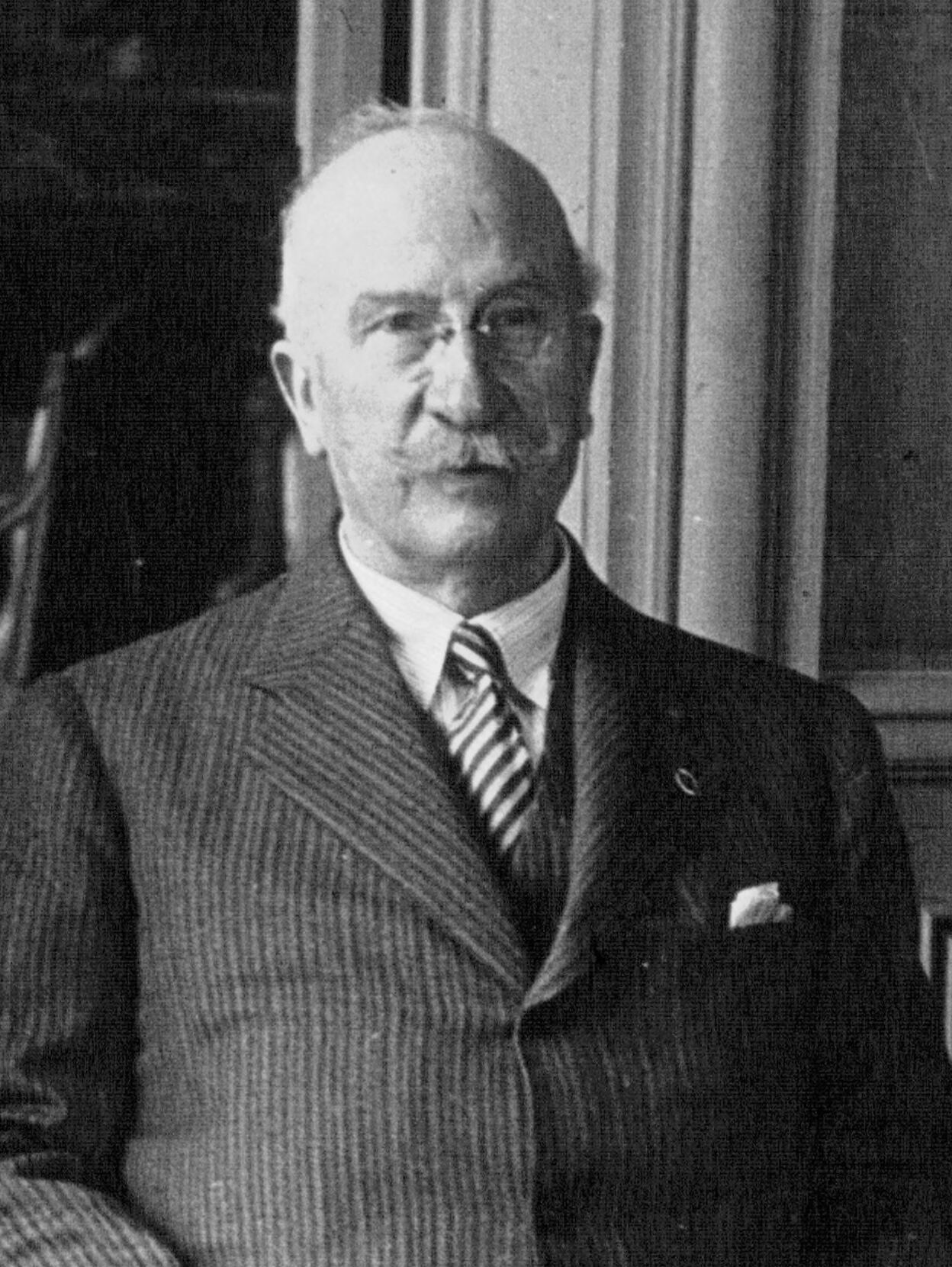
Alejandro Lerroux, leader of the Radical Republican Party, headed the first government of the second biennium, counting on the parliamentary support of the Catholic "accidentalist" right of the CEDA, headed by José María Gil Robles.

The leader of the Radical Party Alejandro Lerroux was commissioned by President Alcalá-Zamora to form a "purely republican" government, but to gain the confidence of the Cortes he needed the parliamentary support of the CEDA, which remained outside the cabinet (and still did not make a public declaration of loyalty to the Republic; and never would), and of other centre-right parties (the agrarians and the liberal democrats who entered the government with one minister each). As Santos Juliá has pointed out:

...the radicals justified this option as the only way to incorporate the Catholic right into the Republic; the Catholic right of the CEDA justified it as the best way to get closer to power in order to reform the Constitution. Backed by his electoral triumph, José María Gil Robles set out to put into practice the three-phase tactic enunciated two years earlier: lend his support to a government presided over by Lerroux and then take a step forward by demanding entry into the government in order to later receive the task of presiding over it.

— Santos Juliá (1999).

Once the presidency was obtained, according to Julio Gil Pecharromán, to give an "authoritarian turn" to the Republic, building a regime similar to the corporatist dictatorships that had just been established in Portugal and Austria. Álvarez Tardío has pointed out in the same sense that the "possibilist right" embodied by the CEDA:

...was not characterised by a liberal discourse, since a good part of its clientele was not willing to accept the costs for the Church of full freedom of conscience. Furthermore, like the [Austrian] Catholics led by Engelbert Dollfuss, they distrusted representative democracy because they considered that, given the danger of social revolution, the participation of the masses could only lead to a class struggle that would destroy society. Faced with this risk, they preferred that the principle of authority of governments be reinforced and that some form of corporate representation be constituted.

— Manuel Álvarez Tardío (2012).

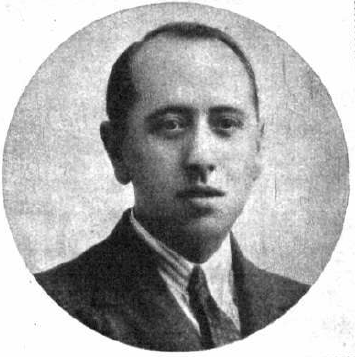
José María Gil Robles, leader of the Catholic "accidentalist" right of the CEDA.

As Gabriele Ranzato has also pointed out, several statements by Gil Robles confirm that his purpose was "to establish an authoritarian-corporate regime, following the model of Salazar's Estado Novo". In the electoral campaign he had made it clear: "democracy is not an end for us, but a means to go to the conquest of a new State. When the time comes, either Parliament submits or we make it disappear"; "we are going to make an experiment, perhaps the last, of democracy. We are not interested. We are going to Parliament to defend our ideals; but if tomorrow Parliament is against our ideals, we will go against Parliament." After his triumph in the elections, he launched the following threat: "Today, I will facilitate the formation of centre governments; tomorrow, when the time comes, I will claim power, carrying out constitutional reform. If they do not hand over power to us, and events show that right-wing evolutions are not possible within the Republic, it will pay the consequences." Likewise, as Luis Palacios Bañuelos has pointed out, in his doctoral thesis Gil Robles had already defended that "the French Revolution was wrong in its principles and doctrines, unjust in its aims and immoral and iniquitous in its procedures." Also that liberalism was the expression of "a misguided and independent habit." This same historian has highlighted that "in his rallies he uses a rhetoric close to fascist", although "when he has to express his ideology in writing, he identifies with the French conservative and modern right and not with Mussolini."

For his part, Ángel Luis López Villaverde has stated that "the CEDA, the main reference of the right, never believed in democratic principles." However, "his [Gil Robles'] corporatism and his criticisms of parliamentarism did not end in praise of fascism," unlike the leader of the monarchist right José Calvo Sotelo, Álvarez Tardío has pointed out. Nigel Townson has also highlighted the distance that existed between the CEDA, despite its doctrine "was not liberal and democratic, but corporatist and authoritarian", and the anti-republican right, insofar as "the party was possibilist, that is, it was willing, in theory, to collaborate with the regime" and this tactic "was not merely opportunistic." Against this last statement by Townson, there are historians who consider that the ultimate goal of the CEDA was "the overthrow of republican power", as would be demonstrated by the tacit support it received from the ex-king Alfonso XIII (with whom Gil Robles held a secret meeting, as did the leader of the JAP, José María Valiente; the latter had to resign when the press revealed his meeting with the ex-king). According to these historians, the CEDA would be following:

...a path similar to that undertaken in Greece precisely from March 1933 by the Popular Party of Tsaldaris and which would in fact lead to the return to the throne of George II after the coup of generals Kondylis and Metaxas (respectively minister and ex-minister of Tsaldaris himself), and the subsequent rigged plebiscite in October–November 1935.

— Eduardo González Calleja and others (2015).

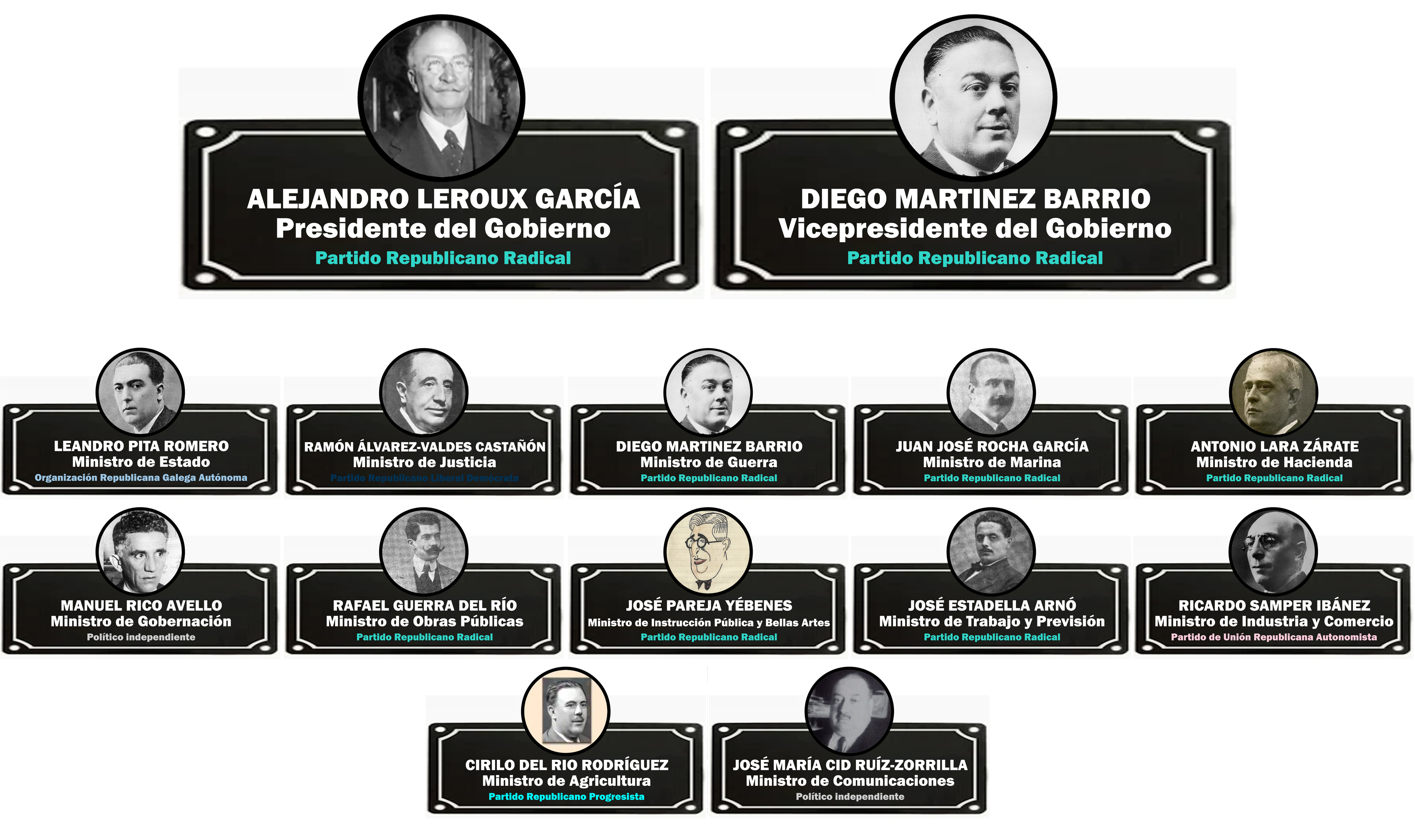
Government of Alejandro Lerroux presented to the Cortes on 19 December 1933 and composed of seven radical ministers, two independent republicans, one liberal-democrat, one agrarian and one progressive.

The support of the CEDA for Lerroux's government, despite the fact that he had voted for the republican Constitution that the Catholics rejected, —which was presented to the Cortes on 19 December and which included seven radical ministers, two independent republicans, one liberal-democrat, one agrarian and one progressive— was considered by the Alfonsine monarchists of Spanish Renovation and by the Carlists of the Traditionalist Communion as a "betrayal", so they initiated contacts with Fascist Italy of Mussolini to provide them with money, weapons and logistical support in order to overthrow the Republic and restore the Monarchy. To this end, in March 1934 they travelled to Rome to meet with Mussolini and Italo Balbo, General Barrera, the Alfonsine Antonio Goicoechea and the Carlist Rafael de Olazábal.

For their part, the left republicans and the socialists considered the radical-cedist pact a "betrayal of the Republic" and the socialists of the PSOE and UGT agreed that they would unleash a revolution if the CEDA entered the government, which was especially serious because the PSOE was one of the parties that had founded the Republic and had governed during the first biennium, warns Santos Juliá. This was expressed in the same investiture debate by the spokesman for the socialist parliamentary group Indalecio Prieto, as reflected in the Official Record of 20 December 1933:

We say more, Mr. Lerroux: we say that we believe that these declarations have in fact opened a revolutionary period; we say that we feel the obligation to defend, by all means, the commitments we left, as essential postulates of the Republic, in the Constitution, and we say that against the coup d'état the revolution will be found. (Loud protests from the right and applause from the socialists). We say, Mr. Lerroux and gentlemen deputies, from here, to the whole country that the Socialist Party publicly undertakes the commitment to unleash, in that case, the revolution...(Exclamations and protests from the right that prevent hearing the end of the sentence. Applause from the socialists. Several gentlemen deputies utter words that are not perceived due to the great noise in the Chamber. The Presidency calls for order.)

— Indalecio Prieto (1933).

In this framework, the new cabinet began to govern with the firm purpose of "rectifying" the course undertaken by the Republic under the left-wing government of the previous biennium. The aim of Lerroux's government was to "moderate" the reforms of the first biennium, not to annul them, with the aim of incorporating into the Republic the "accidentalist" right (which did not openly proclaim itself monarchist, although its sympathies lay with the Monarchy, nor republican) represented by the CEDA and the Agrarian Party. Lerroux thought that a partial "rectification" of the reforms of the first biennium would be enough, maintaining fidelity to the basic principles proclaimed on 14 April, but tensions soon arose because the CEDA and its allies intended to go further in the "rectification". Nevertheless, according to Álvarez Tardío and Villa García:

...the radical governments adopted decisions of varying depth that may have been unacceptable to those who had designed and governed in the previous years, but which did not endanger the Republic, if we understand it as a form of government and a regime of freedoms alien to a party programme.

— Manuel Álvarez Tardío and Roberto Villa García (2017).

=== First crisis: resignation of Martínez Barrio and amnesty law (March–April 1934) ===
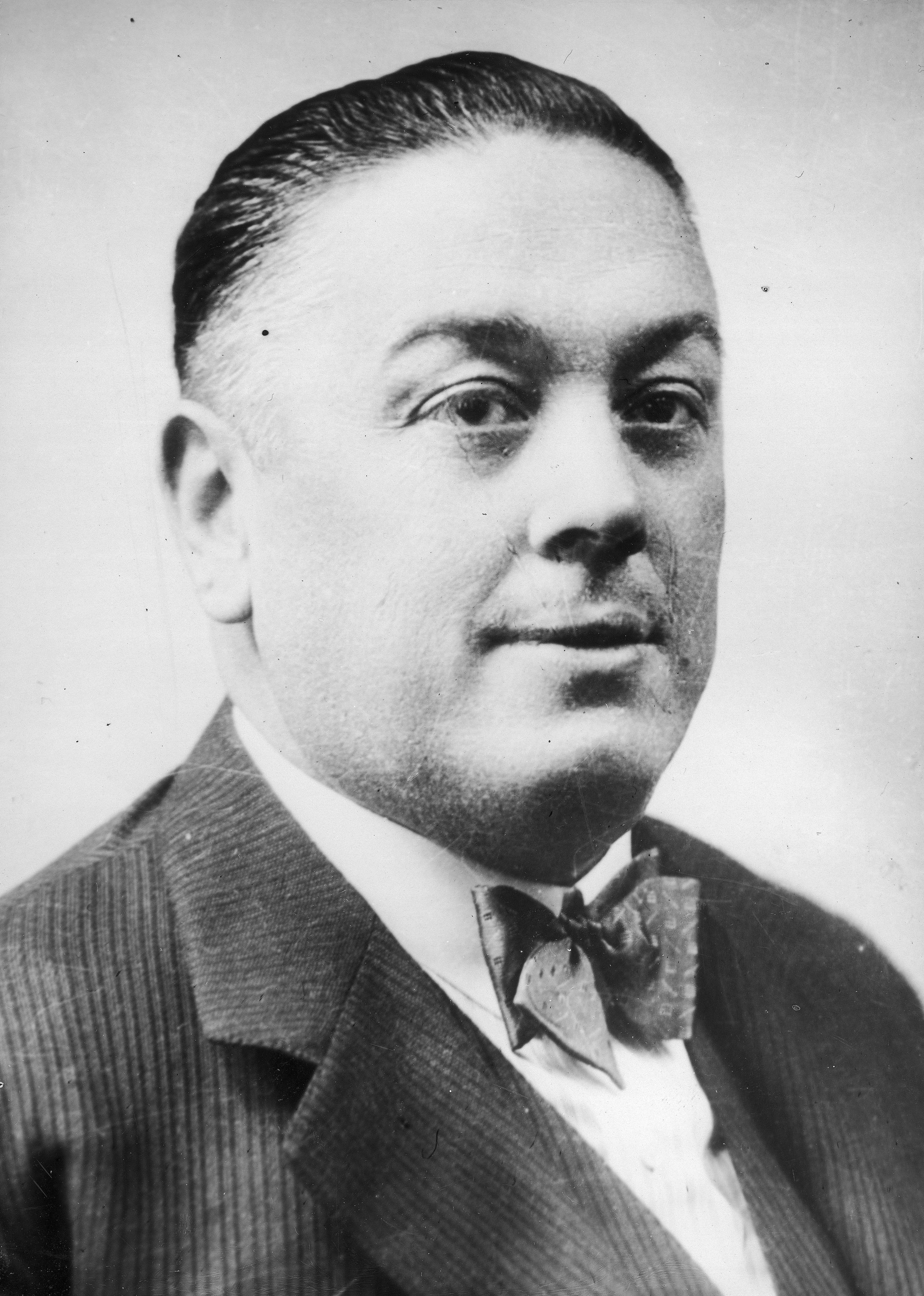
Diego Martínez Barrio, vice president of Lerroux's Government, resigned at the end of February 1934 because of the "right-wing shift" in the policies being applied by the cabinet under pressure from the CEDA. He later left the Radical Republican Party to found the Radical Democratic Party.

Diego Martínez Barrio (virtual number two of the Radical Republican Party, Vice President of the Government and Minister of the Interior) was the first member of Lerroux's cabinet to criticise collaboration with the CEDA, until it declared itself republican, and denounced the pressure it exerted that inclined the government to pursue an increasingly right-wing policy. At the end of February 1934 he resigned, and with him the Minister of Finance Antonio Lara, which forced Lerroux to form a second government on 3 March (Martínez Barrio, Lara and the Minister of Public Instruction José Pareja Yébenes left the cabinet, being replaced by Rafael Salazar Alonso, Manuel Marraco Ramón and Salvador de Madariaga, respectively). With the departure of Martínez Barrio from the cabinet, Lerroux had to give in more and more to pressure from the CEDA, as could be seen in the crisis that broke out in April over the approval of an amnesty law that eventually led to the fall of the government.

Indeed, on 20 April 1934, the Cortes approved the Amnesty Law (one of the three points of the CEDA's "minimum programme", and which also appeared in the electoral programme of the Radical Republican Party), which meant the release from prison of all those involved in the coup d'état of 1932, including General Sanjurjo, as well as the reopening of the headquarters of Spanish Action, allowing José Calvo Sotelo, former minister of the Dictatorship of Primo de Rivera, to return to Spain (finally, those involved in the anarchist insurrection of December 1933 were also included in the amnesty). During the debates, the Minister of Justice, the liberal-democrat Ramón Álvarez-Valdés, was forced to resign for having placed the Jaca uprising and the "Sanjurjada" on the same level.

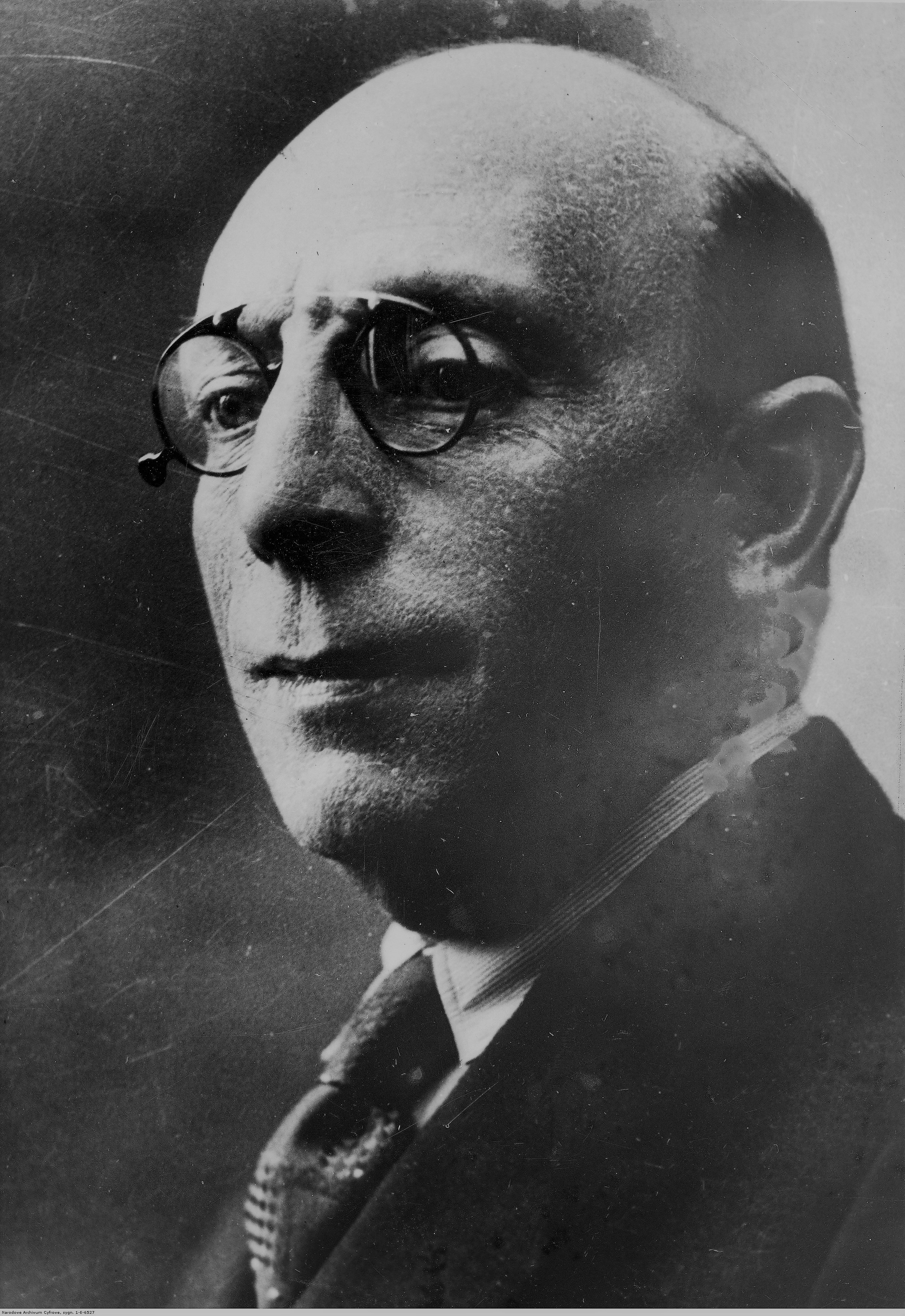
After Lerroux's resignation, feeling disavowed by President Alcalá-Zamora regarding the amnesty law, the Valencian Ricardo Samper took over the presidency of the Government.

The serious problem that arose after the approval of the law by the Cortes was the decision of the President of the Republic Niceto Alcalá-Zamora to veto it, but as no minister accepted to endorse the decree returning it to the Cortes, Alcalá-Zamora had to sign it, although he accompanied it with a long personal document, of dubious constitutionality, in which he raised various objections to the law, one of them being that he had been deprived of the constitutional exercise of the right of veto. Lerroux noted that he had lost the president's confidence and resigned. The solution to the crisis was to find a new radical leader to preside over the government: it was the Valencian Ricardo Samper, who formed the third radical government on 28 April 1934. According to Nigel Townson "the astonishing appointment of a second-rank republican-radical, Ricardo Samper, as prime minister" illustrates "the destabilising influence of the president of the Republic", one of the causes of "the political instability [that] reigned supreme until October 1934". According to González Calleja and other historians, Alcalá Zamora appointed him because he considered him:

more manageable. Samper was not only politically weaker to face Lerroux or Gil Robles but also to control the roosters of his party, particularly the Minister of the Interior Salazar Alonso and the Minister of Finance Manuel Marraco.

— Eduardo González Calleja and others (2015).

=== Government of Ricardo Samper (April–October 1934) ===
The third radical government, presided over by Ricardo Samper and in which he only introduced three changes from the previous one (the radical Vicente Cantos Figuerola in Justice; the liberal-democrat Filiberto Villalobos, in Public Instruction and Fine Arts; and the independent republican Vicente Iranzo in Industry and Commerce), remained in power until the CEDA began at the beginning of October the second phase of its strategy demanding the entry of three of its ministers into the cabinet. The reason was the alleged lack of character of Samper's government to resolve the conflict with the Generalitat de Catalunya caused by the approval by the Catalan parliament of the Cultivation Contracts Law and the subsequent declaration of unconstitutionality by the Court of Constitutional Guarantees.

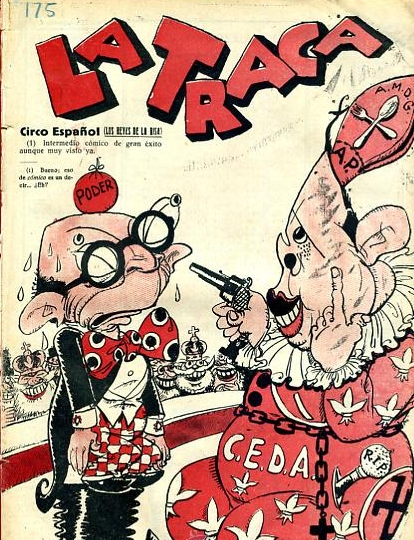
Caricature from the satirical newspaper La Traca about the pressure exerted on the government of Ricardo Samper (on the left, pulling down his pants) by the leader of the CEDA José María Gil Robles (on the right, with a pistol in his hand, girded with a monk's cingulum and wearing a mitre bearing the initials A.M.D.G., motto of the Jesuits, and A.P., initials of Popular Action. The text reads: "Spanish Circus (THE KINGS OF LAUGHTER). (1) Comic interlude of great success although already very seen. (1) Well, that of comic is a way of speaking... Eh?". In the background crowned monarchs laughing.

The initial problem of Samper's government was that as soon as it was born it lost the support of nineteen deputies of its party who followed the steps of Martínez Barrio: the group of dissidents founded the Radical Democratic Party (PRD) and on 19 May made public a manifesto stating that its members had left the PRR because it no longer followed the "old radical ideology" and had "right-winged". Three months later, the PRD joined the Radical Socialist Republican Party (PRRS), headed by Félix Gordon Ordás, to give birth to a new party called Republican Union, which soon began to approach Republican Left, the new party of Manuel Azaña, which emerged in April 1934 from the merger of Republican Action, the Republican Galician Party of Santiago Casares Quiroga and the Independent Radical Socialist Republican Party (PRRSI) of Marcelino Domingo.

The abandonment of the nineteen dissident deputies of Martínez Barrio made the new Samper government even more dependent on the CEDA, which pressured it not only from Parliament, but also on the street with two massive rallies it held in El Escorial (in the midst of the amnesty law crisis) and in Covadonga (6 September), and in which signs typical of fascist paraphernalia appeared, such as the exaltation of its leader José María Gil Robles with shouts of "¡Jefe, Jefe, Jefe!". Nevertheless, historians Álvarez Tardío and Villa García have downplayed the fact that "the Cedists held mass rallies", since "Gil Robles supported Lerroux's governments, publicly stating, again and again, that when the time came for constitutional reform, they would do so by conquering public opinion and ratifying it at the ballot box", although they recognise that the Cedists were "enemies of the classical liberal view of the unquestionable primacy of individual rights".

=== Achievements of the radical governments ===
According to González Calleja and other historians:

...until October [1934] at least there were certain continuous elements with the republican laws that the radicals had voted for and supported in the first biennium, but with substantial tweaks that make the qualifiers of "revisionist" or "rectifier" [of the period] acceptable, combined with a much more explicit rejection of some issues such as the development of the autonomous state and Largo Caballero's labour reforms, especially in the countryside.

— Eduardo González Calleja and others (2015).

==== The "military question" ====
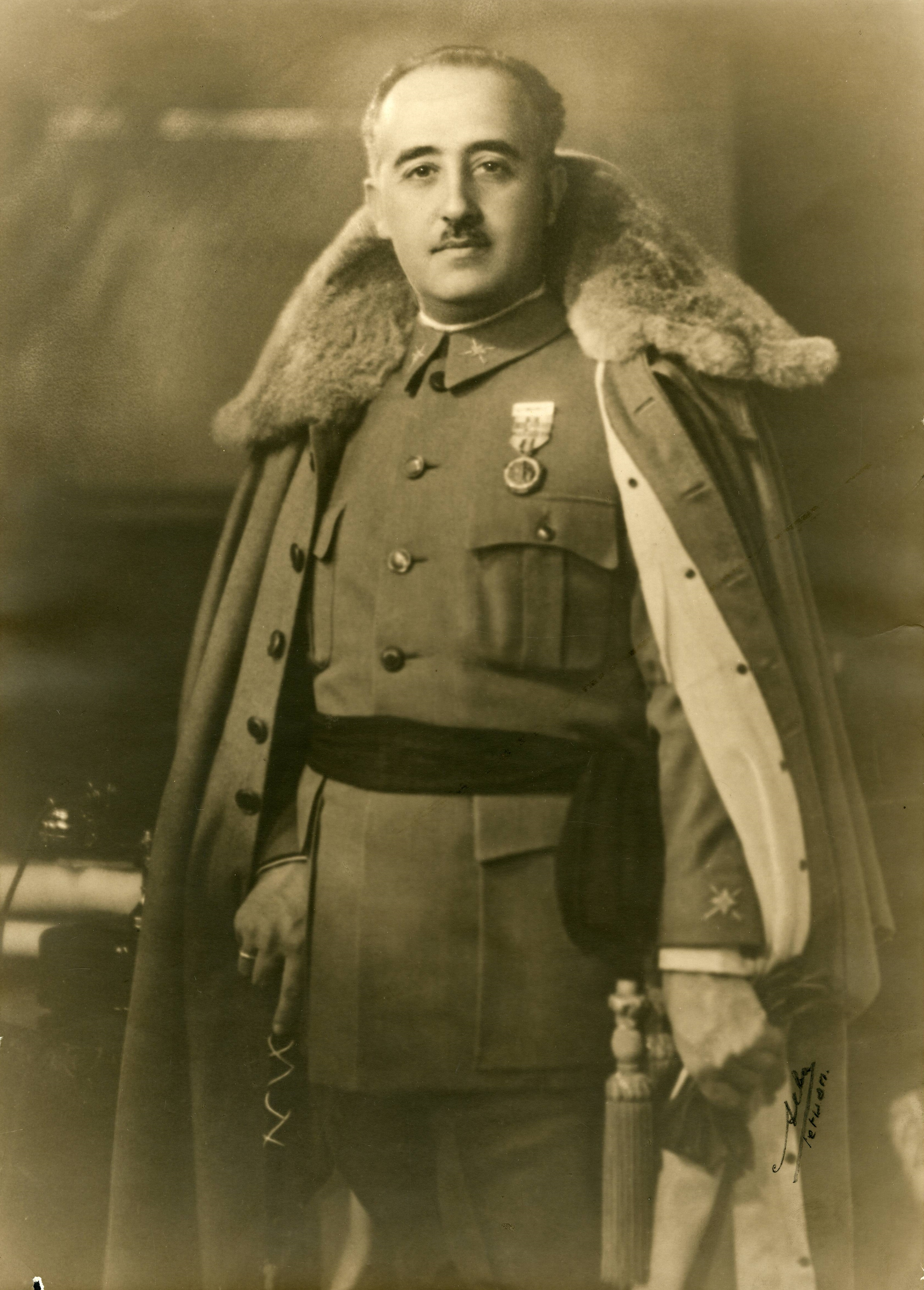
General Francisco Franco was promoted despite his dubious loyalty to the Republic and commissioned by Minister Diego Hidalgo to direct military operations against the rebels in the Revolution of Asturias from Madrid.

Azaña's military reform was maintained and the Minister of War Diego Hidalgo applied a moderate policy, "trying to bring justice and equity to staff appointments". But in his attempt to attract disgruntled soldiers, especially the "Africanists", he granted promotions to vacant positions that should have been eliminated. Thus, soldiers of dubious loyalty to the Republic were promoted, such as General Franco, whom he would eventually entrust with directing military operations against the rebels in the Asturian miners' strike of 1934 from Madrid (although his attempt to appoint Franco as head of the troops destined for Asturias failed, due to opposition from the other radical ministers), or General Goded, involved in the failed coup d'état of August 1932 led by General Sanjurjo. At the same time, he prohibited all military personnel from being members or affiliates of centres, parties, groups or societies of a political or trade union nature and from participating in demonstrations.

==== The "religious question" (and educational) ====
On 19 December 1933, the day the Cortes gave their confidence to Lerroux's first government, the leader of the Catholic right José María Gil Robles asked for "a rectification of the sectarian legislation that has wounded our beliefs", to which Lerroux replied that he "respected the conscience of the majority" and that he opposed the "implacable execution of those laws", but that he would not "fail the law", which meant, according to Nigel Townson, that the government would try "to find a balance between the demands of its right-wing allies and the reforms defended by the left-wing opposition. Consequently, the aim was to modify existing legislation, not to annul it." In fact, neither divorce nor the recognition of illegitimate children, nor the Pedagogical Missions, were abolished, although the latter saw their budget reduced due to "savings" in public spending.

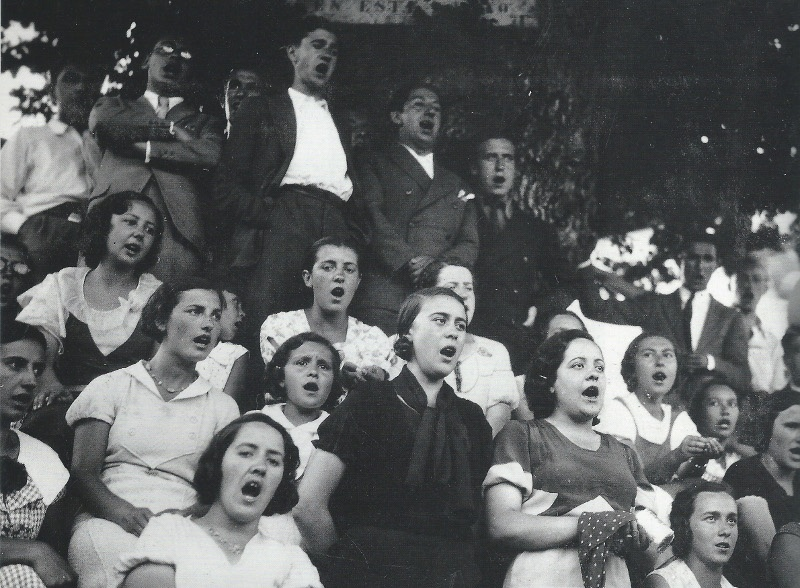
People's Choir of the Pedagogical Missions, which were not suppressed but saw their budget reduced.

The first problem the radical governments had to address in religious matters was the issue of the clergy's salaries. The radicals were aware that if the Constitution of 1931 were strictly applied, according to which the clergy's budget would have to be suppressed during the 1934 financial year, the poorest (rural) parish priests would be left without income (a problem also faced by Manuel Azaña's government, but which it failed to resolve due to opposition from the majority of the left).

Thus, the government approved a bill by which clerics working in parishes of less than three thousand inhabitants and who were over 40 years old in 1931 would receive two thirds of the salary they received then. But when the government brought it to parliament in January 1934, the left accused it of implementing an "anti-republican" policy, and the CEDA also rejected it, although for the opposite reasons, as it considered the proposed financial aid too meagre, a disappointment shared by the more moderate sectors of the Catholic Church led by Cardinal Francesc d'Assís Vidal i Barraquer. The radicals made some concessions, including towns with more than three thousand inhabitants, and finally the Cedists supported the project (although it was still "far removed" from their expectations) and the law was approved on 4 April 1934. The daily El Socialista published the following day: "As of yesterday, no distinction can be made between the radical party and that led by Mr. Gil Robles. With concessions of this kind, the Republic will not last four months... If the Republic has to live as it currently lives, we prefer it to die." The Radical-Socialists stated that the law endangered the "purity of the republican regime". For its part, the monarchist right demanded the restoration of the 1931 clergy budget in its entirety. On the other hand, Holy Week, except in some places like Málaga and Córdoba, could be celebrated normally in 1934.

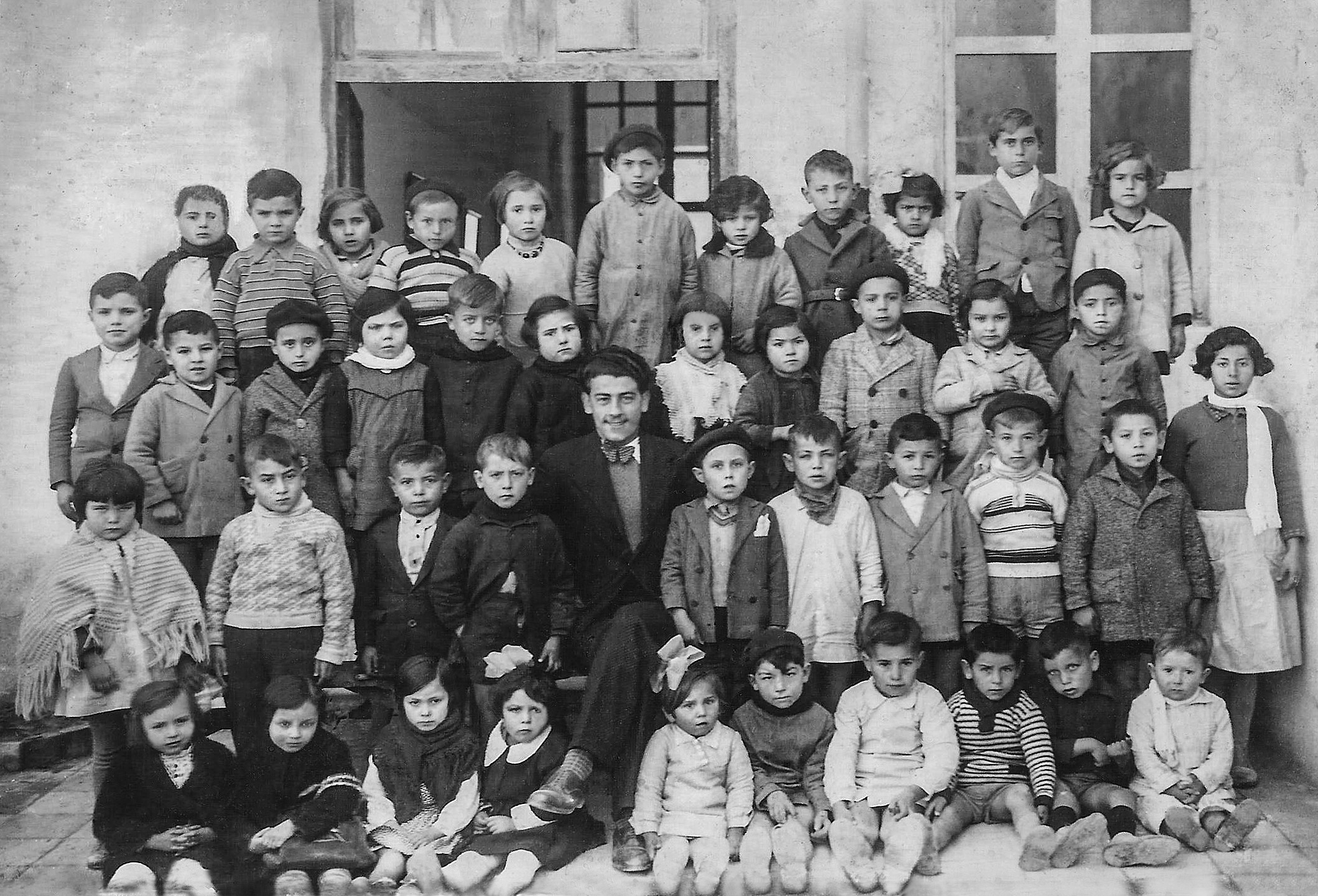
Students of the National School of Alginet with their teacher Emilio Luna (academic year 1932–1933). Coeducation, opposed by the Catholic right of the CEDA, was suppressed by the radical governments.

The second battle of religious policy took place in the field of education. The radical government was aware that the replacement of private religious schools by public schools, scheduled for 1 January 1934 in the case of primary education, posed serious administrative and budgetary problems given the lack of money, schools and teachers (at that time religious schools catered for three hundred and fifty thousand pupils in primary education alone). For example, the city council of Cádiz calculated that the one hundred and thirty classrooms needed for the municipality would cost around 665,000 pesetas, but the money it received from the government through an extraordinary credit was one hundred thousand pesetas. An alternative for the government was the expropriation of the buildings of religious schools to turn them into public schools, but this option was unacceptable to the CEDA, its parliamentary ally, which considered education "a vital issue, on which we cannot in any way go back", and besides, the radicals still bet on the integration of the Catholic "accidentalist" right into the Republic. Thus, Lerroux's government presented on 31 December 1933 a bill extending the deadlines for the replacement of primary education, although the government would continue to build public schools. Furthermore, since the 1931 Constitution allowed private schools, the Catholic Church could have kept many of its schools open because a good part of them had been put in the name of school mutualities, parents' associations or the Sociedad Anónima de Enseñanza Libre (SADEL), a company promoted by the Catholic Confederation of Parents and which included prominent right-wing politicians, such as the leader of the CEDA José María Gil Robles, that of the Agrarian Party José Martínez de Velasco or the monarchist Pedro Sáinz Rodríguez (the latter would be the first Minister of Education of the Franco dictatorship). Coeducation, one of the main demands of the Catholic right, was also suppressed.

However, that the radicals were not exactly "puppets" of the right, as the left claimed, was demonstrated by the new baccalaureate plan that in the summer of 1934 was presented by Filiberto Villalobos, Minister of Education of Samper's government, a plan inspired by the pedagogy of the Free Educational Institution which thereby enraged the CEDA, in addition to, because in compliance with the Constitution of 1931, it excluded the teaching of religion. Although El Socialista accused Villalobos of allowing the Ministry to be "invaded" by the Jesuits, spending on education in 1934 and 1935 increased above the level of the first biennium. The pace of construction of public schools accelerated and the number of primary school teachers grew. Their salary was also increased by 33%. All this demonstrates, according to Nigel Townson, that "the governments led by the republican-radicals achieved a truly centrist compromise regarding education: they boosted the public sector while protecting the private one."

The radical governments were also receptive to the "complaint" presented by the Catholic Church at the end of February 1934, regarding "the excesses repeatedly committed by many local authorities against the free exercise of Catholic worship, particularly with regard to Catholic funerals and Viaticums, and the use of bells." Although in many localities no obstacle had been placed to Catholic celebrations outside the temples (which the 1931 Constitution did not prohibit, but subjected to a system of authorisations), with the arrival of the radicals to power, the public presence of Catholic worship in the street increased notably, although unevenly. On the other hand, the radical governments returned property to the Jesuits, apparently those that had been illegally confiscated, and exempted four religious institutes from the application of the Law of Confessions and Congregations, two of which were orders dedicated to charitable activities.

The last aspect of the religious policy of the radical governments was, at the same time, the one they kept most secret: the attempt to negotiate a concordat with the Vatican. Lerroux's government already stated in its presentation that some kind of agreement with Rome was essential, although without including the revision of the Constitution, in order to integrate into the Republic not only the possibilist Catholic right, but the vast majority of Catholics. In January 1934 there was a first contact for the normalisation of diplomatic relations, but the Vatican made it a condition for granting the agrément to the new ambassador, Leandro Pita Romero, that he be sent to try to remedy "the serious damage suffered by the Church in Spain as a result of recent anti-religious legislation", to which the Government refused.

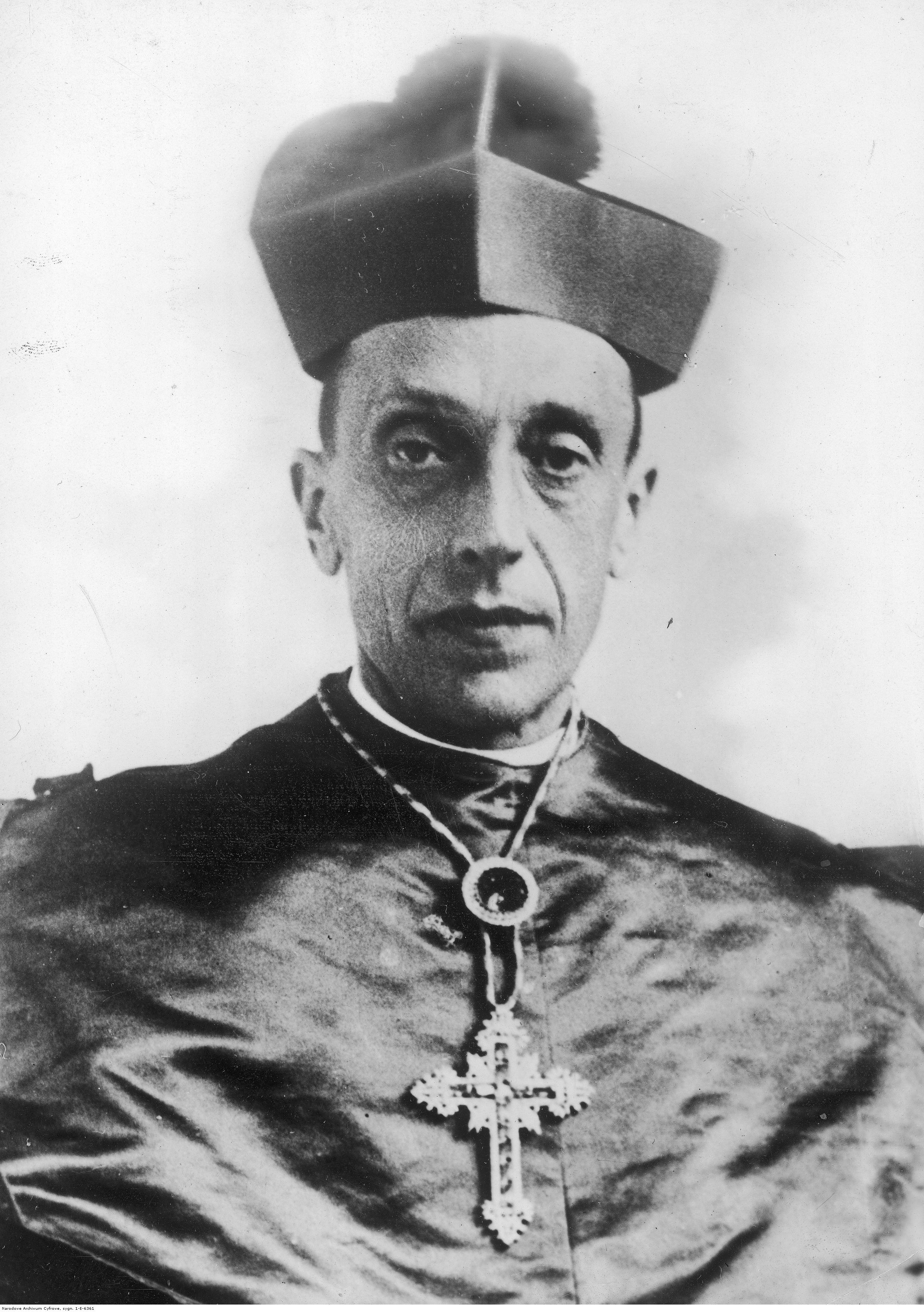
Cardinal Francisco Vidal y Barraquer failed in his attempt to reach some kind of understanding between the Republic and the Holy See.

Contacts continued, in secret and without the CEDA intervening in them, and in May the Vatican granted the agrément to Ambassador Pita Romero, who at the beginning of June took up his post in Rome with the task of negotiating a new concordat based on the project that had been approved by the council of ministers and which consisted of 47 articles. As the Vatican let him know that the Constitution was an insurmountable obstacle to signing a concordat, Pita Romero presented in August a shorter project for a modus vivendi. But no progress was made in the negotiation because the Vatican, with the support of the Spanish Church, headed by the fundamentalist Isidro Gomá, demanded the substantial revision of the "anti-religious legislation" that had caused "serious damage" to the Church in Spain. After the defeat of the Revolution of October 1934, the Vatican's and the Spanish ecclesiastical hierarchy's rejection of the modus vivendi intensified, making the agreement impossible. Everything was bet on the CEDA occupying the presidency of the government and changing the Constitution. The nuncio Federico Tedeschini communicated this on 22 July to Cardinal Francesc d'Assís Vidal i Barraquer, who had been the member of the Spanish ecclesiastical hierarchy who had worked hardest to reach some kind of understanding between the Republic and the Holy See.

==== The "social question": employer pressure and CNT and UGT offensive ====
Largo Caballero's socio-labour reforms were partially "rectified" under pressure from employers' organisations, but neither the Labour Contracts Law nor the Mixed Juries Law were repealed (although some changes were introduced, such as purging their presidencies and vice-presidencies of socialists, who were given a ten-day deadline to leave their posts, replaced, as requested by employers, by judicial career officials), which exasperated employers. The radical governments also did not backtrack on the issue of unemployment benefit, which they increased to ninety days per year worked.

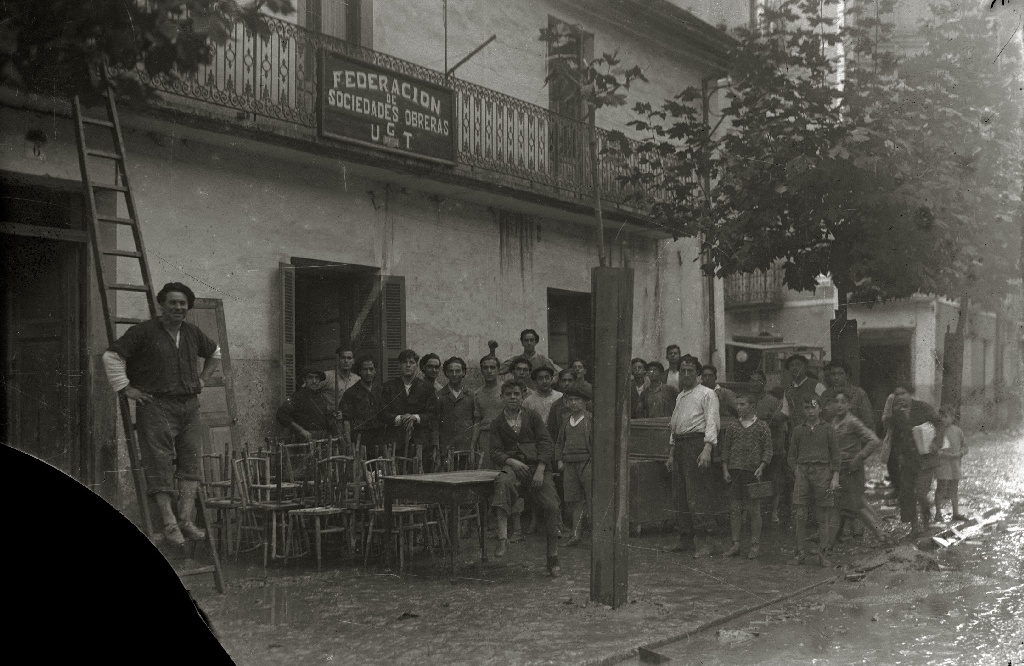
Headquarters of the Federation of Workers' Societies of the UGT (Gipuzkoa, 1933).

One of the reasons for not carrying out the "labour counter-reform" demanded by employers was that the unions still retained a great capacity for mobilisation, which translated into a growing wave of strikes throughout 1934 (the most significant were those in construction and metallurgy in Madrid, which managed to reduce the working week from 48 to 44 hours, following an award by the Mixed Jury ratified by an Order of the Minister of Labour José Estadella; the tram and port strikes in Barcelona and, above all, the thirty-six day general strike that paralysed Zaragoza), which for the first time since the proclamation of the Republic were called by joint committees of the UGT and CNT. This was what forced the government to maintain the Mixed Juries to try to end strikes with rulings that at least partially gave workers reason, which increased the discontent of employers with the Radical Party governments, whom they accused of weakness and of betraying those who had voted for them.

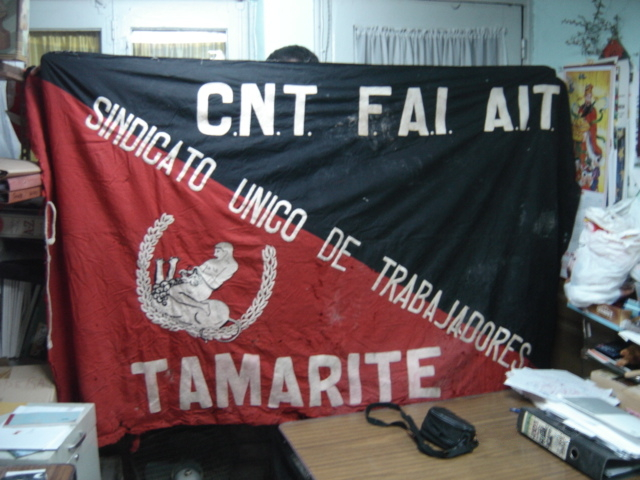
Flag of the Single Union of the CNT-FAI of Tamarite de Litera (Huesca).

Employers had interpreted the election result as an opportunity to revoke the labour legislation of the first biennium, but the governments of the Radical Republican Party were not meeting their expectations, to the point, as Nigel Townson has pointed out, that "the approach of the centrist governments to labour disputes in 1934 led them to lose the support of employers." An employer from the radical party lamented that the radical government had declared "war on employers". Rey Reguillo agrees with Townson when he states that:

...there were important labour conflicts in which the radical authorities leaned openly in favour of the unions. A clear example was the coal mining strike declared in the Puertollano basin during April and early May 1934... [which] ended with the unequivocal victory of the unions thanks to the pressure exerted by government authorities on the company.

— Fernando del Rey Reguillo (2012).

In relation to the "social question", Nigel Townson has highlighted as one of the main achievements of the radical governments, which "has gone almost completely unnoticed", the Health Coordination Law of June 1934, which, according to this British Hispanist, "meant an unequivocal step forward in the creation of a national health system". It was "the first national health law approved by the Cortes since 1855!", Townson notes. However, González Calleja and other historians have pointed out that it "left healthcare basically in the hands of municipal treasuries" and that:

...the law eventually foundered like others, a victim of the heterogeneity and ups and downs of the second biennium, as neither was an independent Ministry of Health created, nor did Chapaprieta's budget cuts in 1935 allow it, nor did the CEDA seem very interested in a state takeover of health.

— Eduardo González Calleja and others (2015).

==== The "agrarian question": general peasant strike ====
Cirilo del Río Rodríguez, who was in the three radical cabinets at the head of the Ministry of Agriculture, respected the planned pace of application of the Agrarian Reform Law, so in 1934 more peasants were settled than during the entire previous biennium, and four times as many properties were expropriated, although the Amnesty Law approved in April 1934 returned to the "grandee of Spain" nobility part of the lands that Azaña's government had confiscated from them due to the involvement of some of its members in the Sanjurjada. "It is true that the reform progressed at a snail's pace."

But the main objective of Cirilo del Río's policy was to dismantle the "socialist power" in the countryside, for which he annulled or substantially modified the agrarian decrees of the Provisional Government signed by Largo Caballero. As José Manuel Macarro Vera has pointed out, "according to the government, most of the conflicts arising in the countryside were the result of an abusive interpretation of legislation by the Mixed Juries and the local commissions of the towns." According to this same historian, "the Municipal Boundaries Law had been another disaster by confining in their towns the labourers who had always left them during the harvests." The Municipal Boundaries Law was repealed and the presidency of the Mixed Juries would no longer be held by a person appointed discretionally by the Minister of Labour (Largo Caballero had almost always appointed a UGT member, so owners complained that the Juries systematically ruled in favour of the labourers), but by a judicial career official appointed by the minister following a public competition. A ten-day deadline was given for the socialist presidents or vice-presidents of the Mixed Juries to leave them. It was also prevented from applying the strict rotation to be able to work in the field, which therefore could no longer be controlled by the unions.

The policy of "uprooting socialist power" in the countryside obeyed, according to Santos Juliá, the offensive of rural landowners who had interpreted the victory of the right and centre-right in the November elections as a triumph over labourers and tenants. Some of them used the expression "eat Republic!" when labourers asked them for work or when they evicted tenants. González Calleja and other historians agree with Juliá when they state that after sealing the parliamentary pact between the radicals and the CEDA, the "employers' front set out to achieve the repeal of the main laws and decrees that had led, during the first biennium, to the control exercised by socialist or anarchist agricultural unions over labour markets and wage setting." However, according to Macarro Vera, the policy of "uprooting socialist power" responded to what the Radical Party "had promised in the electoral campaign": to amend socialist legislation.

There is no agreement among historians on the impact of the changes introduced by the radical governments. According to Julio Gil Pecharromán, the modification of the legislation of the first biennium allowed owners to again enjoy almost complete freedom to hire the labourers they needed. As a consequence of all this, according to Santos Juliá, agricultural wages, which had increased during the first biennium, fell, although, according to José Manuel Macarro Vera, the data disprove that "starvation wages" returned. In contrast, Rey Reguillo in his study of the province of Ciudad Real states that:

...it is true that many employers pressured to lower wages and violate social legislation, as much as they could, but the [civil] governors tried to neutralise this tendency, even going so far as to fine owners who did so. For their part, in labour disputes the Mixed Juries tried to act impartially, with much more impartiality than in the first biennium, given that the responsibility of arbitration was now left to judicial career officials, unlike the previous period, when the presidents were hand-picked by the Minister of Labour (who, remember, was a prominent leader of the UGT, the socialist trade union).

— Fernando del Rey Reguillo (2012).

Del Rey Reguillo's conclusions on the province of Ciudad Real contrast with what González Calleja and other historians affirm about Spain as a whole. According to them, the radical governments "in general, turned a blind eye to the massive violations of labour laws in rural areas, where the traditional hiring order, arbitrary and hostile to unionisation, was rapidly being re-established." They point out "the systematic obstructionism practiced against the provisions on hiring issued by left-wing mayors"; "the non-payment of wages established in the "generous" Work Bases signed during 1933, reaping countless complaints"; the non-compliance with "the provisions of the Rural Police Commissions regarding forced labour"; the repeated boycott of "the municipal employment offices, marginalising in the hiring of labourers and agricultural wage earners most closely linked to the trade union organisations of the socialist left or anarchist." According to these historians:

From a number of localities impossible to specify, given their vast extent, complaints constantly arrived throughout the first months of 1934, denouncing how social laws were "a dead letter", or how the ordinary functioning of the Mixed Juries languished irremediably, many of them seeing themselves virtually paralysed by the boycott declared by the employers' representatives. In the midst of such an adverse situation, by mid-1934 most of the Mixed Rural Labour Juries had succumbed to the bureaucratic malaise generated by the accumulation of innumerable files of employer indictment for non-payment of wages, whose resolution was delayed ad infinitum. From almost all the Andalusian provinces, as well as those of Extremadura, some Castilian-Leonese, Levantine and Castilian-Manchegan ones, equally endless complaints came from the local unions of the FNTT evidencing the starvation wages —between 2 and 2.5 pesetas— and the sun-up to sun-down working days widely practiced.

— Eduardo González Calleja and others (2015).

On the other hand, in February 1934 the Crop Intensification Decree was not renewed, so about twenty-eight thousand families were evicted from the plots they cultivated on farms that kept land uncultivated. The government argued that land had been unjustifiably occupied to distribute plots that could not feed a family. Likewise, facilities for evicting tenants who did not meet the payment deadlines established in contracts were increased.

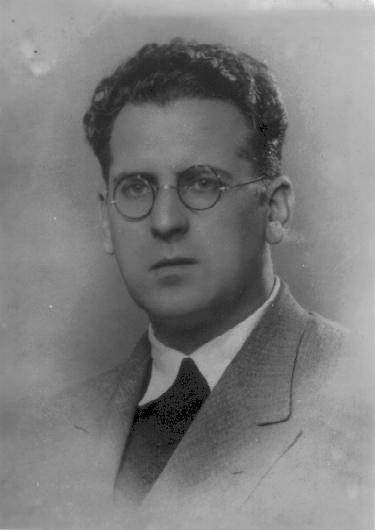
Ricardo Zabalza, general secretary of the National Federation of Land Workers (FNTT-UGT) who organised the failed general peasant strike of June 1934.

The union response was not long in coming. At the end of February 1934, the National Committee of the FNTT, against the opinion of the trade union organisation to which it belonged (UGT), announced a general strike for June, the beginning of the harvest season. At that time, agricultural unemployment was increasing (there were more than four hundred thousand unemployed, 63% of the total, which was around seven hundred thousand, representing 18% of the active population).

To prepare the strike, the FNTT began a very aggressive propaganda campaign with references to the Soviet Union ("Thus they triumph in Russia, thus we will triumph") and with calls for peasants to take power ("Armed insurrection, revolution!"). However, the signing of work bases for the provinces of Córdoba and Seville, two of the large latifundia provinces, which extended what had been agreed the previous year, with which the socialists had agreed, brought down the strategy of the FNTT leadership, headed by its new general secretary Ricardo Zabalza, but the strike was not called off. On 14 May, Zabalza met with the Minister of Labour José Estadella Arnó, who together with the Minister of Agriculture Cirilo del Río and the Prime Minister Ricardo Samper himself tried the negotiation route to avoid the strike, but failed.

On the reason for the failure of the negotiation, historians' interpretations differ. According to Casanova and Ángel Luis López Villaverde, the failure to reach an agreement was due to the intransigent attitude of the Minister of the Interior Rafael Salazar Alonso, convinced that the strike was only the beginning of a revolutionary movement, so he ordered civil governors to "suspend and prohibit all kinds of meetings" and impose prior censorship in the press on everything referring to the peasant strike. According to José Manuel Macarro Vera, the responsibility for the failure of the negotiation must be attributed to the leadership of the FNTT which:

...as the strike began to make no sense, changed its demands. Now what it demanded was that work be done by compulsory rotation. A rotation that the State could not supervise due to lack of officials. So who had to do it was the socialist union. That is, the socialists again demanded that they be given back the powers to control the labour market, turning the UGT into the sole representative of the State... As is logical, the government opposed such a claim.

— José Manuel Macarro Vera (2012)

Rey Reguillo agrees with Macarro Vera:

The general peasant strike of June 1934 could have been avoided if the socialist FNTT had been willing to compromise on some demands, which would not have substantially altered the work bases they demanded. At bottom, apart from the specific disagreements in the negotiation of those bases, what was at stake was the control of local power. The socialists of the rural world were not willing to retreat from any of the positions conquered —often by unorthodox methods— during the first biennium.

— Fernando del Rey Reguillo (2012).

The FNTT maintained the call, even without the approval of the UGT national executive (which was preparing a general revolutionary strike of national scope), and the peasant strike began on 5 June 1934, at the time the harvest was about to start, hoping that urban workers would support them. They did not join. The strike affected more than five hundred municipalities in Andalusia, Extremadura and La Mancha, and about two hundred more in other provinces. It lasted from five to fifteen days, depending on the degree of socialist implantation in each place. "It was the largest agrarian strike in [Spanish] history," Casanova has stated.

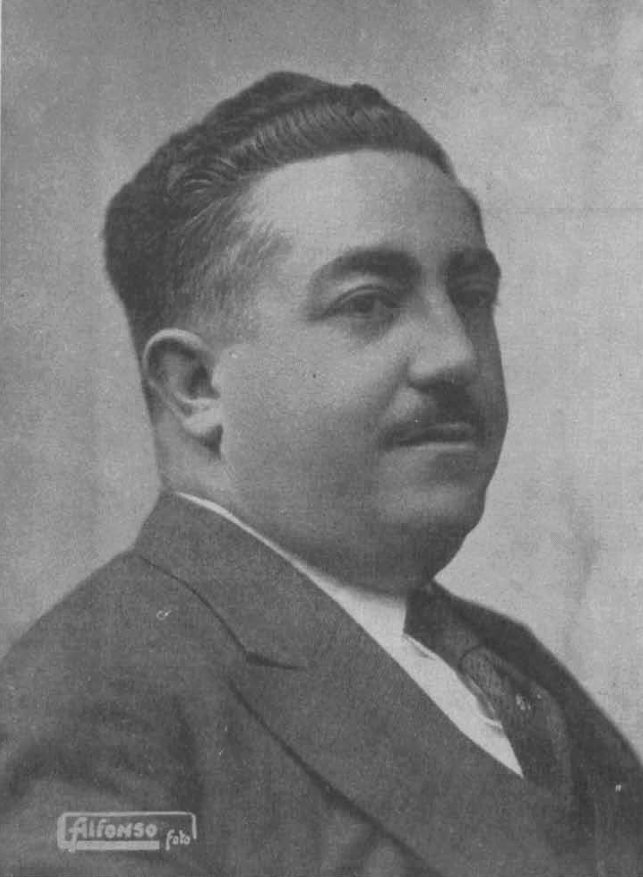
Rafael Salazar Alonso, Minister of the Interior who harshly repressed the peasant strike of June 1934.

The government ended up supporting the hard line of the Minister of the Interior Salazar Alonso, who considered the strike a "revolutionary movement" and declared the harvest of "national interest", giving instructions to prevent the action of peasant organisations. Thus, "the largest agrarian strike in history" gave rise to unprecedented repression in the Republic. There were more than ten thousand arrests and about two hundred left-wing councils were dismissed and replaced by right-wing managers appointed by the government (mostly from the Radical Party). Clashes between strikers and public order forces (and with strike-breakers) caused thirteen deaths and several dozen injuries.

As a result of Salazar Alonso's harsh actions, agrarian trade unionism was practically dismantled, further weakening the capacity of agricultural labourers to resist landowners. The following month, the National Committee of the UGT met, in which a heated debate took place between a delegate from the Federation of Education Workers and General Secretary Largo Caballero, in which the former criticised that the union had not declared a general strike in support of the peasant movement, as Lenin would have done, to which Largo Caballero replied that the UGT did not follow Lenin's slogans and that leading workers against the State at that time would have been madness.

==== The "regional question": paralysis of the Basque Statute and conflict with the Generalitat of Catalonia ====
The first three governments of the Radical Republican Party neutralised the statutory impulse typical of the integral State defined in the Constitution of 1931 (which according to the CEDA posed a danger of "disintegration of the fatherland"), causing serious tensions where autonomy processes were already underway. In the case of Galicia, as the Galicianist Party was left without parliamentary representation after the November elections, the statutory process was frozen throughout the biennium (the Galician Statute would not be approved in a referendum until 28 June 1936, but never came into force due to the triumph in Galicia of the July 1936 coup d'état).

Paralysis of the Basque Statute and conflict over the economic agreement

In February 1934, the process of approving the statute of autonomy of the Basque Country was paralysed when a deputy of the Traditionalist Communion —supported by the CEDA, the agrarians and the monarchists— proposed the exclusion of Álava from Basque autonomy, alleging that the necessary majority (50%) had not been reached there in the referendum held on 3 November 1933 (a fact that had occurred precisely because of the opposition of the Traditionalists to the Basque Statute). On 12 June, the deputies of the PNV —which had achieved great success in the November elections, obtaining 13 of the 17 deputies at stake in the Basque Country— withdrew from the Cortes in protest at the paralysis of the processing of their Statute and in solidarity with Republican Left of Catalonia, which had also withdrawn its deputies after the Court of Constitutional Guarantees annulled the Cultivation Contracts Law approved by the Catalan parliament.

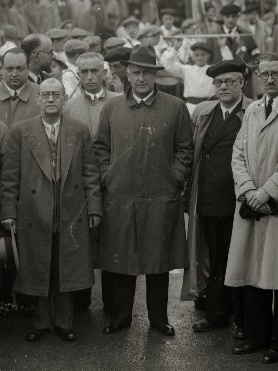
The mayor of San Sebastián Fernando Sasiain (centre) leading a demonstration in Hernani in 1935. He led the protest in defence of the Economic Agreement of the Basque Country.

In the summer of 1934, a conflict arose around the Economic Agreement (the central government had approved that Spanish wine be tax-free throughout the territory, which meant modifying the specific tax regime for wine trade in the Basque Country) which provoked an institutional rebellion of the municipalities. The initiative was led by the republican-socialist majority council of Bilbao and the movement was led by the mayor of San Sebastián, the republican Fernando Sasiain (who in August 1930 had presided over the meeting of the Pact of San Sebastián held at the headquarters of his party), and was supported by the rest of the Basque municipalities, many of them governed by the PNV. The key point of the conflict was the calling by the municipalities of the three Basque provinces (without the approval of the Cortes) of indirect elections (councillors voted) for 12 August in order to appoint a Commission to negotiate the defence of the Economic Agreement, which the government tried to prevent by all means (it arrested and prosecuted more than a thousand mayors and councillors and replaced numerous councils with government management commissions).

The moment of greatest tension was reached during the first fortnight of September. On the 2nd, the Basque parliamentarians, both socialists and from the PNV, presided over by Indalecio Prieto, socialist deputy for Bilbao, held an Assembly in Zumárraga in solidarity with the municipalities, also attended by some deputies of Republican Left of Catalonia (however, the PNV did not want to subscribe to the proposal that political parties form commissions to assume the direction of the movement of the municipalities, because that would give it a "political" slant linking it to the "revolution" that the socialists were preparing; in fact, on 28 September the PNV parliamentarians agreed to return to parliament and a party spokesman stated that the PNV would not support or contribute to the "rumoured movement" announced as a "revolutionary general strike"). On 7 September, the Basque councils resigned en masse and on 10 September, the mayor and thirty-one councillors of the Bilbao City Council were arrested (and shortly after taken to the prison of Burgos) accused of the crime of sedition for having been the initiators of the "rebellion". On the previous day, 9 September, the owner of a hotel and known Falangist Manuel Carrión Damborenea was murdered in San Sebastián, and the following day, the leader of Republican Action Manuel Andrés Casaus, who had been Director General of Security in the last Azaña government, was also murdered in San Sebastián (the funeral of Manuel Andrés Casaus, led by Manuel Azaña and Indalecio Prieto, constituted the largest mass act held in San Sebastián up to that time). Finally, on 15 September, the Bilbao businessman Horacio Echevarrieta, at one time a close friend of Indalecio Prieto, was arrested on suspicion of being involved in the Turquesa arms shipment discovered days earlier in Asturias. With this arrest, the government tried to give the public the impression that Echevarrieta had acquired the weapons for his old friend Prieto and the revolution the socialists had been announcing for some time.

Conflict with the Generalitat of Catalonia over the Cultivation Contracts Law

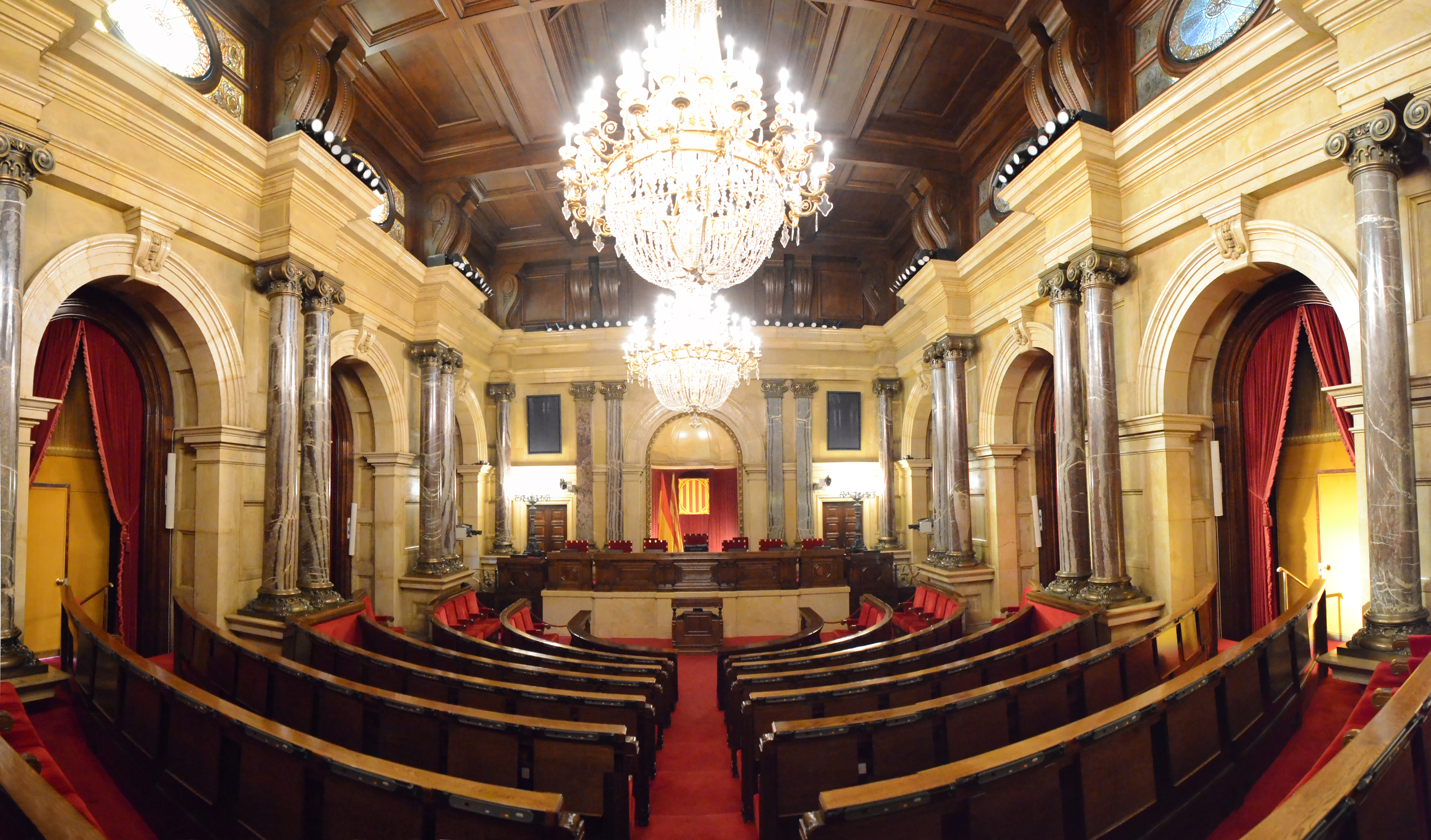
Plenary Hall of the Parliament of Catalonia.

The conflict with the Generalitat of Catalonia (presided over by Lluís Companys, who had replaced Francesc Macià who died at Christmas 1933) was about the promulgation on 14 April 1934 of the Cultivation Contracts Law approved by the Parliament of Catalonia (with the opposition of the Lliga, which withdrew before the vote), which gave facilities to tenants (especially of vineyards: the rabassaires) to purchase the plots they had cultivated for more than 15 years (if the parties did not agree, the price would be set by an Arbitration Board). The owners, grouped in the Catalan Agricultural Institute of Saint Isidore, protested —on 29 April a large demonstration took place in Barcelona bringing together about two hundred thousand people— and managed, with the support of the Lliga (for which the norm meant "the sovietisation of the Catalan countryside"), to get Samper's government to take the law before the Court of Constitutional Guarantees. On 8 June it declared it unconstitutional, by thirteen votes to ten (three of them radicals), arguing that the Catalan parliament had exceeded the powers attributed to it by the Statute of Autonomy of Catalonia of 1932.

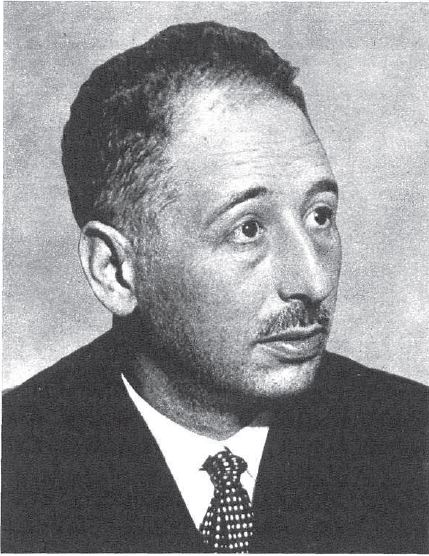
Lluís Companys, president of the Generalitat of Catalonia from December 1933.

The response of the Generalitat of Catalonia was to withdraw from the Cortes Generales the eighteen deputies of Republican Left of Catalonia (one of them stated that "Catalonia, under the protection of the Constitution, will continue its work for its own liberties and for Spanish liberties"), accompanied by the twelve from the PNV, and to propose to the Parliament of Catalonia an identical law that was approved amid shouts in favour of the freedom of Catalonia on 12 June, which constituted a serious challenge to the government and the Court of Constitutional Guarantees. The socialists and left republicans supported the Generalitat. Indalecio Prieto stated in the Cortes that the socialists would never leave Catalonia alone, "because with it will be all of the Spanish proletariat". For his part, Manuel Azaña referred to the "Catalan people wounded in their intimate feelings of nationality, land and language" by the ruling and proclaimed that Catalonia was "the last bastion left to the Republic" and the Generalitat "the last republican power left standing in Spain". President Macià in October 1933, two months before his death, had already warned that "if the Republic falls there, the Republic will be maintained here", which was reinforced by his successor Lluís Companys: "If somewhere the Republic were to fail, Catalonia would be the strongest bulwark of the Republic."

From that moment on, Samper's government tried to negotiate with that of the Generalitat throughout the summer, reaching a compromise solution (in which President Alcalá-Zamora discreetly acted as intermediary), but the CEDA, with the support of the Catalan Institute of Saint Isidore (which organised a large rally in Madrid on 8 September, which was answered with the declaration of a general strike), accused him of lack of energy in the "rabbassaire question" and ended up withdrawing its support, which would open the crisis of October 1934. A sign that a certain détente had been reached between the Madrid government and the Catalan Generalitat was that the PNV deputies returned to the Cortes on 28 September after the meeting held in Barcelona days before between the PNV leader José Antonio Aguirre and Companys in which the latter confirmed that the conflict over the Cultivation Contracts Law was being resolved.

== Revolution of October 1934 ==
According to González Calleja and other historians, "October 1934" was "the largest workers' insurrection in the history of Spain" and marked "a before and after" in "the socio-political dynamics of the Republic". As Casanova has pointed out, "nothing would be the same after October 1934." For Gabriele Ranzato, with the Revolution of October 1934 "the fragile Spanish democracy suffered a very hard blow. And the most indicative aspect of its fragility is that those who attacked it, putting it in serious danger, were largely the same political forces that had contributed to laying its foundations by founding the Second Republic and providing it with a Constitution that, despite some limitations, could represent a guarantee of democratic coexistence." "The main protagonists of that attack on democracy were the socialists," adds Ranzato. Ángel Luis López Villaverde agrees with Ranzato: "It caused a brutal wearing down of the Republic and the credibility of the democratic system, because it was its own architects, who had governed shortly before, who violated it." According to Álvarez Tardío and Villa García, "the October revolution poisoned political life and added an even greater dose of uncertainty about the viability of the regime. Just the opposite of what an incipient democracy needed to consolidate." In the same vein, Nigel Townson has pointed out that "the revolutionary strike declared throughout the nation, the proclamation by the Generalitat of a Catalan State within the 'Spanish Federal Republic' and the workers' uprising in Asturias changed the republican regime forever." Starting from his study of what happened in the province of Ciudad Real, Rey Reguillo also warns that "October was a point of no return in rural communities, implying the definitive rupture of coexistence, already very battered for quite some time in numerous localities."

On the other hand:

...the events that followed the "October revolution" deprived a posteriori of any justification not only the methods used to defend the Republic, but also the exalted conviction that it was in extreme danger. Because not only the Constitution, but also the institutions and democratic praxis remained essentially unaltered. To the point of offering, within a much shorter period than a state of emergency —more than possible in view of what had happened— would have allowed, the opportunity to the forces defeated in that circumstance to return to power through the electoral route.

— Gabriele Ranzato.

An assessment shared by Álvarez Tardío and Villa García. And also Nigel Townson, although he qualifies that in some aspects "the repression was excessive."

Shortly after the failure of the "October Revolution" and the repression that followed, the Catalan journalist Agustí Calvet, Gaziel, wrote in the Barcelona daily La Vanguardia:

If the right are to be absent from the Republic, when the left are in power, and then, when the right are the ones governing, the left are to go mad and launch into revolution, there will be no, there has not yet been, true democracy in Spain. Like so many other things, democracy is just a name with classical roots and foreign content.

=== Triggering factor: entry of the CEDA into the government ===
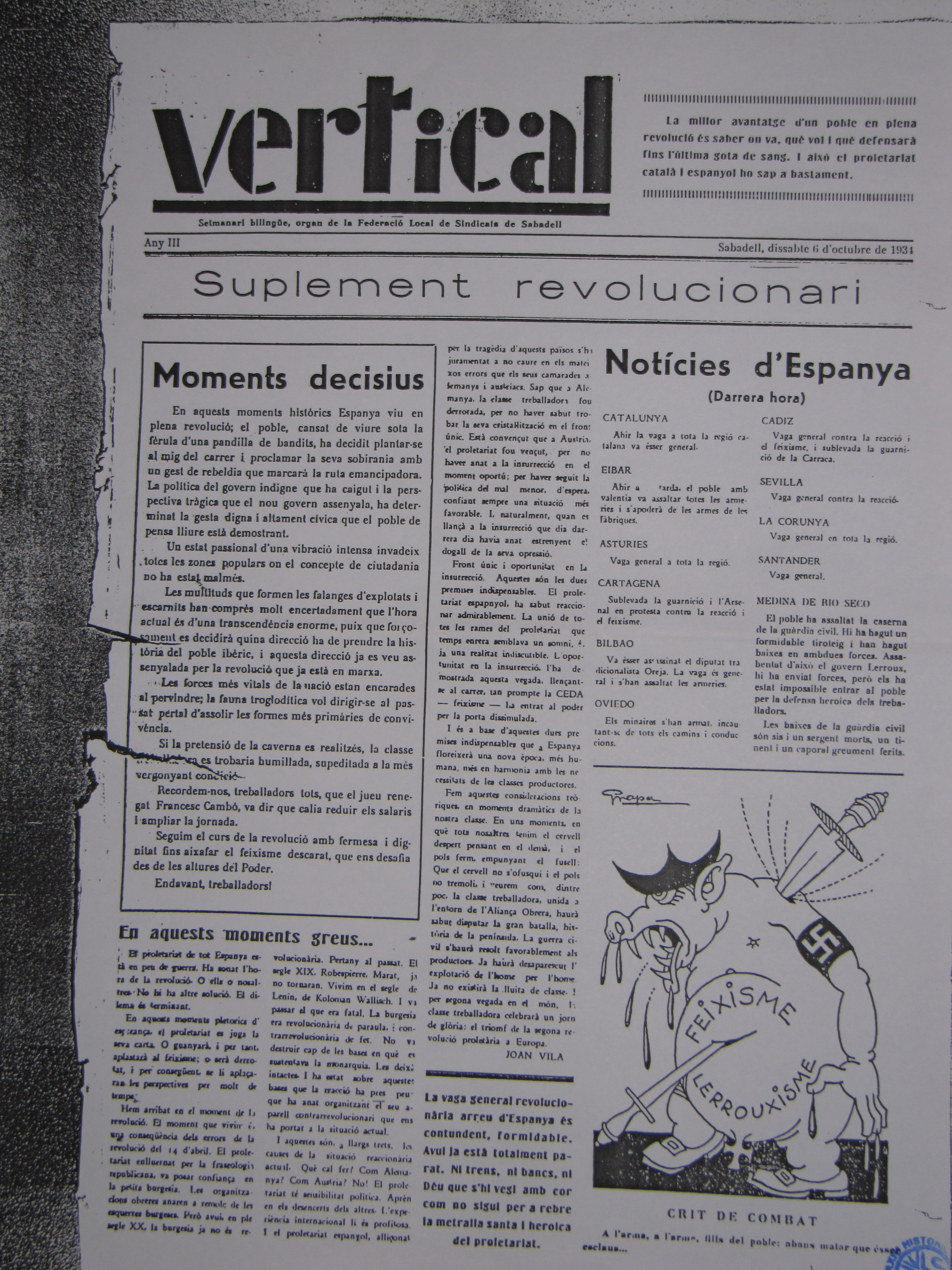
Front page of the "Revolutionary Supplement" of the Sabadell newspaper Vertical published on Saturday, 6 October 1934, the day after the entry into the Government presided over by Alejandro Lerroux of three ministers from the CEDA. In the lower right appears a caricature of a pig wearing a priest's biretta and a bracelet with the Nazi swastika and a shield with the words "Fascism" and "Lerrouxism". It is being knocked down by two swords. The caption reads (in Catalan): "To arms, to arms, children of the people, better to kill than to be slaves...".

Upon the return from the parliamentary summer recess of 1934, and before the Cortes met, the CEDA announced that it was withdrawing its support from Ricardo Samper's government and demanded entry into it. In the opening session on 1 October, Samper tried to defend his management (he announced that he had reached a preliminary agreement in the conflict over the Cultivation Contracts Law), but the CEDA did not support him, so he had to resign. Then the president of the Republic was faced with a serious political problem, as the left republicans (Republican Union of Martínez Barrio and Republican Left of Manuel Azaña) pressured him to dissolve the Cortes, call new elections and not consummate the "betrayal" that meant "the monstrous fact of handing over the government of the Republic to its enemies", in Azaña's words. Also the conservative republican Miguel Maura protested against "handing over the regime to the hands of those who represent the negation of the postulates and principles of 14 April". But Alcalá Zamora, although hostile to the CEDA leader Gil Robles, adhered to the rules of democratic systems and proposed to Alejandro Lerroux again as president of a government that would include three ministers from the CEDA (Manuel Giménez Fernández in Agriculture, José Oriol Anguera de Sojo in Labour and Rafael Aizpún in Justice; three very significant ministries for the "social question", the first two, and for the "religious question", the third). The composition of the new government was made public on 4 October and the left-wing daily Heraldo de Madrid published that same day: "The Republic of 14 April has perhaps been lost forever. The one that begins its life today does not interest us." Rafael Guerra del Río, a historic radical and Minister of Public Works, demanded that a condition be set for the CEDA to enter the government that it proclaim its fidelity to the Republic, but he was not listened to (and was not reappointed). For their part, the socialists fulfilled their threat that they would unleash the "revolution" if the CEDA acceded to the government and called the "general revolutionary strike" that would begin at midnight on 5 October. "A revolutionary action whose consequences were disastrous," Gabriele Ranzato has stated.

As José Manuel Macarro Vera has pointed out:

...at the moment when three CEDA ministers became part of the government, the box of thunder was opened in the Second Republic. With the exception of the radicals, all the republicans broke with that disfigured Republic, from Azaña to Diego Martínez Barrio, including the conservatives Sánchez Román and Miguel Maura. The socialists took to the streets where they could and reaped a catastrophe.

— José Manuel Macarro Vera (2012).

=== Radicalisation of the socialists ===
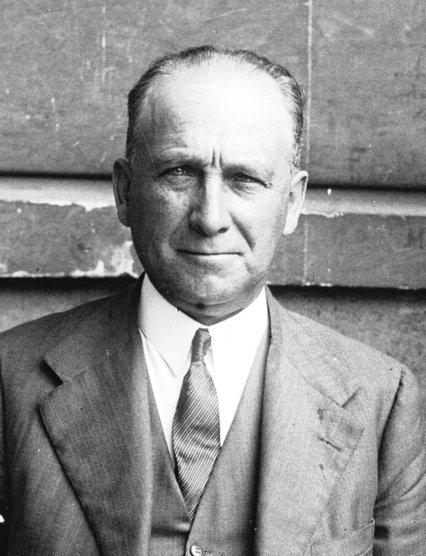
Francisco Largo Caballero

==== Abandonment of the "parliamentary path" to achieve socialism ====
The Spanish socialists, like the majority of social democracy in continental interwar Europe, believed that the day of the socialist society would come, and they called that process "revolution", a rhetorical and futuristic resource frequently used and not renounced, but which was seen as a long-term social change. That is why they did not dedicate themselves to preparing armed insurrections (nor to preparing their members for this eventuality), but rather to trying to seize power peacefully/electorally and to seek better laws, measures, wages and living and working conditions.

— Eduardo González Calleja and others (2015).

This strategy to achieve socialism, the "parliamentary path", was abandoned by the socialists after their exclusion from the government in September 1933 and their break with the republicans (although they had already begun to consider it with the formation of Azaña's last government in June, and in fact the first "rupturist" speeches by Largo Caballero were given in July), and was replaced by the insurrectionary path to seize power.

In that same month of September 1933, the National Committee of the PSOE approved a resolution committing itself to "defend the Republic against all reactionary aggression and [affirming] its conviction of the need to conquer political power as an indispensable means to establish socialism". The resolution obtained only three negative votes, one of them from Indalecio Prieto, but not because he was against preparing a possible armed insurrection, but because he disagreed with the final clause ("as an indispensable means to establish socialism").

Likewise, the socialists announced that they would not consent to the correction of the social laws approved when they were in government nor to jeopardise the control that the "working class" —in reality the UGT— had over the arbitration mechanisms, such as the Mixed Juries, precisely the measures that had raised an "anti-socialist tide" (in the words of historian José Manuel Macarro Vera) in rural areas (including the Municipal Boundaries Decree which the UGT itself had denounced because it had harmed the labourers who traditionally worked outside their locality at certain times of the year, especially during the harvest, but had not managed to get its promoter, Largo Caballero, to recognise his mistake and repeal it).

According to the new strategy, the PSOE decided to stand alone in the general elections of November, breaking its alliance with the left republicans, whom it partly blamed for the "ignominious expulsion" from the Government in September. During the electoral campaign, Largo Caballero, who had become the socialist leader embodying the new orientation, reiterated that "the Socialist Party is going to conquer power" and after the electoral defeat he said: "We went to a revolution and power fell into the hands of the republicans and today there is a republican Government in power and it is already destroying what we did." Largo Caballero was more explicit in a speech given in Madrid in January 1934:

I declare that it would be necessary to go to that [arming], and that the working class will not fulfil its duty if it does not prepare for it. [...] It must be engraved in the conscience of the working class that, to achieve triumph, it is necessary to fight in the streets with the bourgeoisie, without which power cannot be conquered.

On 1 May 1934, Luis Araquistáin, the main ideologue of socialist radicalisation, wrote in the magazine Leviatán that he himself directed:

The Republic is an accident... reformist socialism is failing... Let us not trust solely in parliamentary democracy, even if socialism once achieves a majority: if it does not use violence, capitalism will defeat it on other fronts with its formidable economic weapons.

But for the insurrectionary path to be legitimate, according to the socialists, there had to be a "reactionary provocation", which they soon linked to the entry of the CEDA into the government. The day after the elections, Indalecio Prieto had already said that if the CEDA entered the government, "publicly [the Socialist Party] undertakes the commitment to unleash... the revolution". Paradoxically, this change of orientation coincided with the closure of the CNT's insurrectionary cycle, after the failure of the anarchist insurrection of December 1933. "Just when the anarchists were exhausting the insurrectionary path and criticisms of these actions of "daring minority" appeared within the movement, the socialists announced revolution," Casanova has highlighted.

In an article published in El Socialista shortly after the formation of Lerroux's first government in December 1933, it was said:

We want Power for our Party. We want victory for Socialism. Before now we have warned that our duty lies in not tying ourselves to democracy and parliamentarism, a duty all the more pressing as democracy and parliamentarism block our way.

==== Internal debate: defeat of the "Besteirista" sector ====
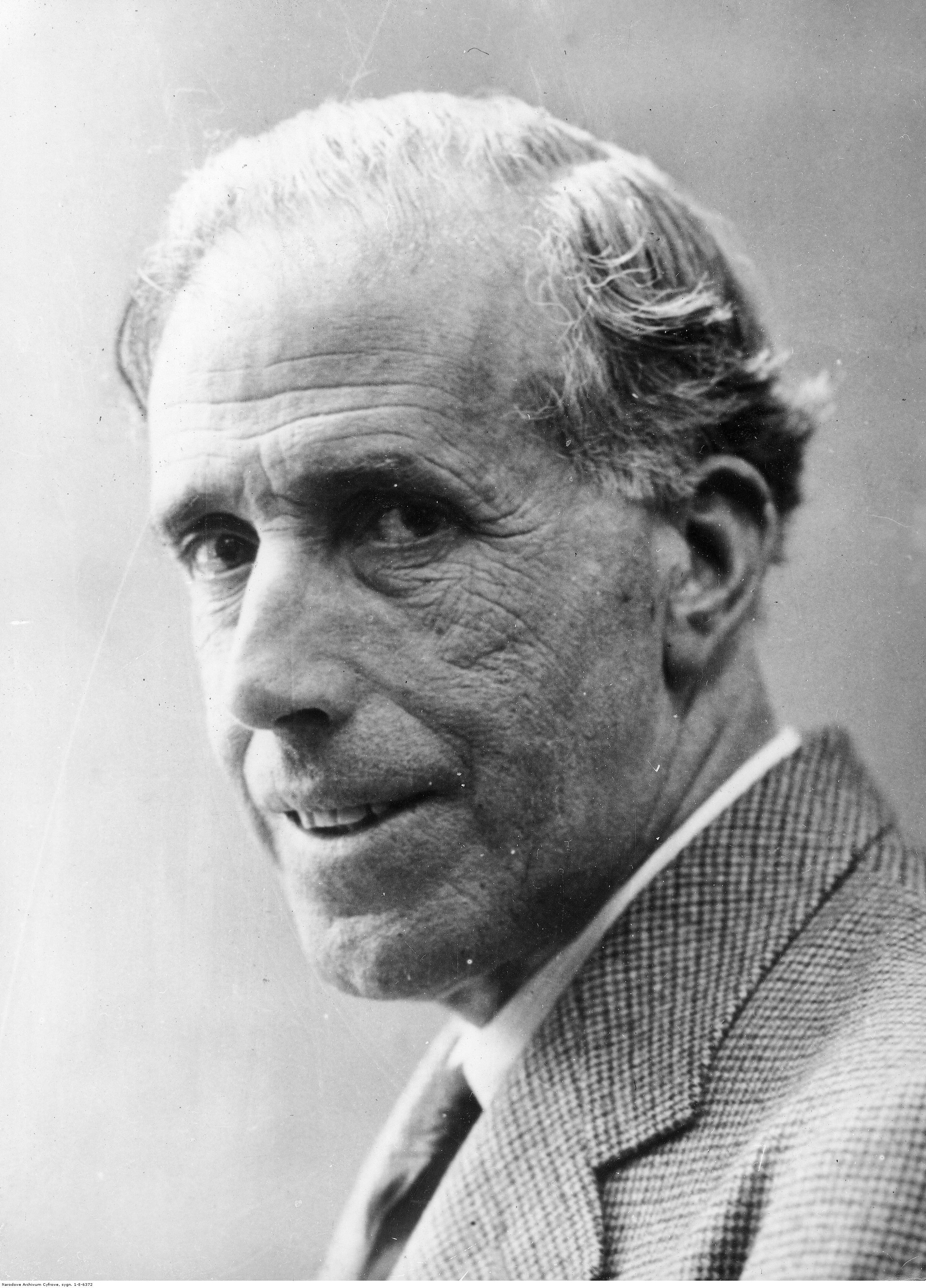
Julián Besteiro led the socialist sector opposed to the abandonment of the "parliamentary path". After being defeated in a vote of the UGT National Committee, he had to resign from his position as general secretary of the union.

The change in the political orientation of the socialists occurred after an intense internal debate that intensified as soon as the victory of the right in the elections became known. On 25 November, a joint meeting of the executives of the PSOE and the UGT took place in which the need to organise some action to prevent "a fascist-type thing" (in Largo Caballero's words) was raised. During the meeting, it became clear that there were two antagonistic positions: that held by Julián Besteiro, with the support of Trifón Gómez and Andrés Saborit, in favour of following the "parliamentary path" with the aim of "defending the Republic and democracy"; and that held by Francisco Largo Caballero, with the support of Indalecio Prieto who until then had held more moderate positions, in favour of the revolutionary turn. "Here began to be experienced a decisive moment in the life of socialism," José Manuel Macarro Vera has pointed out. At the joint meeting of the UGT National Committee and the PSOE Executive held on 13 December, Andrés Saborit stated that what had happened was that they had been taken by surprise "by the drive of the right and that intimidates us and darkens our minds, but from there to suppose that there is a preparation of fascism in Spain" is a mistake. What has happened in Spain is a "terrible electoral coalition against us, not against the Republic," he concluded. On 31 December, the UGT National Committee rejected, after a tumultuous debate and by 28 votes to 17, a motion presented by the "Caballerist" Amaro del Rosal regarding "the immediate and urgent organisation, in agreement with the Socialist Party, of a national revolutionary movement to conquer political power entirely for the working class".

With the purpose that Julián Besteiro and his followers, who controlled the UGT, would accept the abandonment of the "parliamentary path", the leadership of the PSOE presented a "Draft bases" with ten points drafted by Indalecio Prieto on behalf of the executive, to which Besteiro responded with the presentation of a "Proposal of bases". In the first document, revolutionary measures prevailed (such as the nationalisation of land or the dissolution of the army, as a preliminary step to its democratic reorganisation) over reformist measures (in administration, finance and industry, which would not be socialised, although workers would have some degree of control over companies, along with "measures aimed at their moral and material improvement"), while the second document advocated the continuity of the reforms of the first biennium. Furthermore, to apply the "Draft bases", the "Caballeristas" (as the supporters of abandoning the "parliamentary path" would be called) presented for discussion five "concrete points of action to be developed", the first of which set out the will to organise "a frankly revolutionary movement with the greatest possible intensity and using all available means". During the debates, Besteiro, addressing Prieto, told him:

The programme you described yesterday [an immediate action plan to seize power] seems to me so reckless that if the proletariat manages to seize power under those conditions..., if it can hold onto power it will have to do such things that I do not think the country can withstand. That for me constitutes a real nightmare and seems to me an obsession in others, truly fatal for the UGT, for the Socialist Party and for our entire movement.

— Julian Besteiro (1933).

When on 27 January 1934 the UGT National Committee overwhelmingly voted in favour of the "Draft bases", Besteiro had no choice but to resign from his position as general secretary of the UGT, being replaced by Largo Caballero, who thus accumulated the presidency of the party and the general secretary of the union (young leaders who had stood out for their radical attacks on the Besteiristas joined the new executive, such as Amaro del Rosal, a former communist; Carlos Hernández Zancajo, who in April would occupy the presidency of the Socialist Youth; and Ricardo Zabalza, who would immediately go on to lead the powerful National Federation of Land Workers, FNTT). It was the first step of the new revolutionary strategy. Largo Caballero himself interpreted it thus:

The die is cast, the Party and the General Union are now agreed to organise a revolutionary movement with a concrete programme in order to come out in front of reactionary manoeuvres.

However, in the following months Largo Caballero will practically ignore the "Draft bases" and focus on what he would call the "succinct programme" of the revolutionary movement:

With political power in our hands we will annul capitalist privileges and before any other the right that gives them to exploit the workers. Does anyone want a more succinct programme?

==== Factors of socialist radicalisation ====
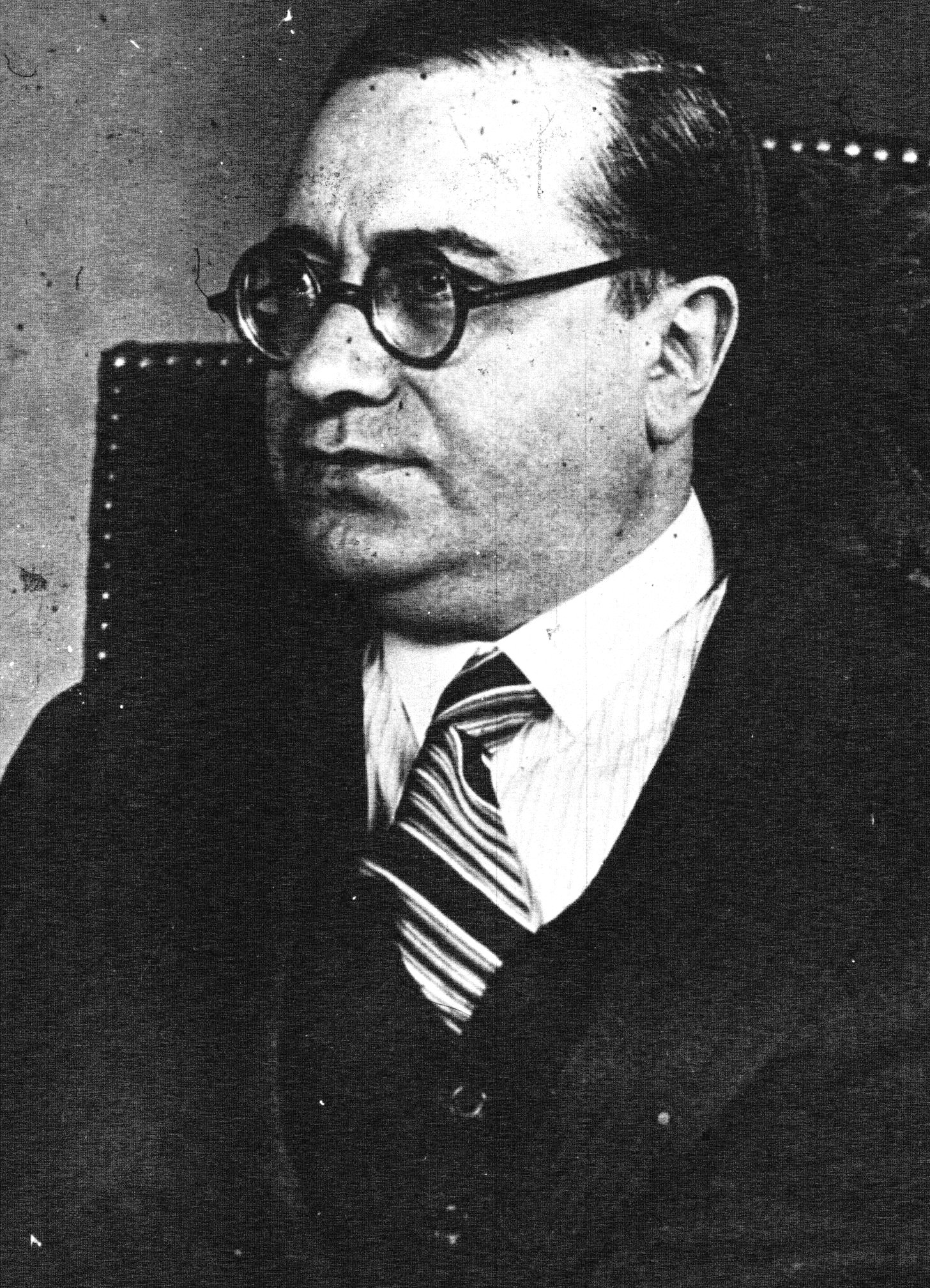
Luis Araquistain was one of the main ideologues of socialist radicalisation. He was Spain's ambassador to Germany when the Nazis took power on 30 January 1933.

According to José Luis Martín Ramos, the change of strategy was fundamentally due to the fact that among the socialist bases a "growing unease" had taken hold "due to the non-compliance, or delay, of the reformist legislation [of the first biennium], and also due to the rise of the anti-reformist tide" (therefore, according to this historian, "the radicalisation of the PSOE and the UGT was neither gratuitous, nor did it come from top to bottom"). González Calleja and other historians share this explanation —the radicalisation of the socialists "cannot be understood without the pressure of the working masses," they have stated— but add that what happened a few months earlier in Germany also influenced, where the SPD (the reference socialist party in Europe and main standard-bearer of the "parliamentary path to socialism"), had been suppressed after the Nazis took power in January 1933 (of which Luis Araquistáin, then Spanish ambassador to Germany, and future ideologue of the radicalisation of the PSOE, had been a direct witness), as well as what happened in Austria, where in March the Christian Social Chancellor Dollfuss had closed Parliament (in which the Social Democratic Party SDAPÖ was the parliamentary group with the most deputies) and announced that from then on he would govern by decree, which meant a coup d'état from within the government.

To what happened in Germany and Austria in 1933, Casanova adds as a factor that influenced socialist radicalisation, internal events such as the appearance of fascist violence of Falange (in January 1934 there was an assault on the premises in Madrid of the left-wing University School Federation (FUE), in which several students were attacked, by a Falangist militia commanded by Matías Montero, who would be murdered on 9 February; the murder of the socialist Juanita Rico in July by Falangist gunmen), and the verbal aggressiveness of Gil Robles with continuous declarations against democracy and in favour of the "totalitarian concept of the State", in addition to the "fascist" demonstrations of the CEDA youth (the Popular Action Youth, JAP). Gabriele Ranzato also agrees with this, highlighting the role played by the figure of Gil Robles in the socialists' decision to prepare a revolutionary insurrection. During the electoral campaign he had made it clear: "democracy is not an end for us, but a means to go to the conquest of a new State. When the time comes, either Parliament submits or we make it disappear." Shortly before, after attending as an observer the Nuremberg Rally of the Nazi Party held in September 1933, Gil Robles had stated that there were common elements between that party and the CEDA such as "its eminently popular roots and action; its exaltation of patriotic values; its clear anti-Marxist significance; its enmity with liberal and parliamentary democracy" —although he rejected "Nazi statolatry"—.

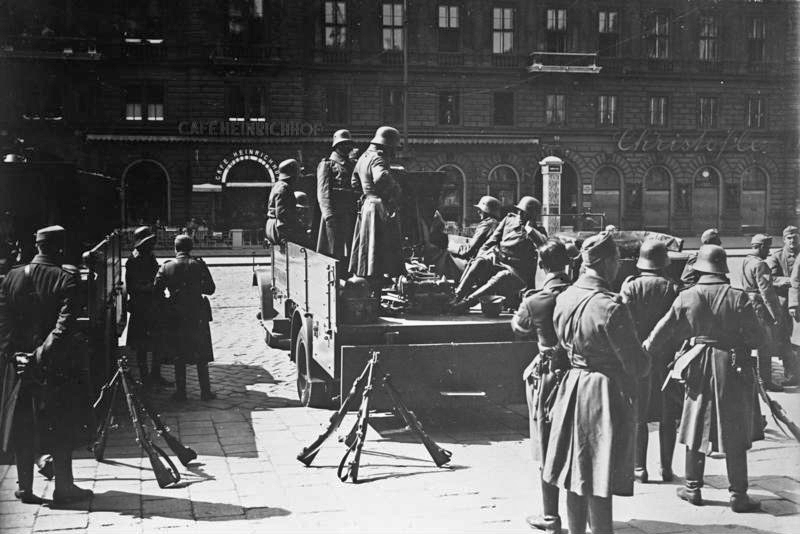
Troops of the Austrian Federal Army deployed in Vienna in February 1934 to suppress the rebellion of the socialists against the dictatorship of the Christian Social Dollfuss. For some historians, what happened in Austria would be one of the factors explaining the radicalisation of the Spanish socialists.

The events of February 1934 in Austria confirmed the fears of the Spanish socialists (also, although to a lesser extent, the attempted assault on the French National Assembly on 6 February by the far-right Leagues). In order not to suffer the same fate as the German SPD, the Austrian socialists revolted in Vienna, whose municipal government they had held since 1919 (hence it was known as Roten Wien, 'Red Vienna'), but they were crushed by the Christian Social dictator Dollfuss. The socialist press published photos of the executions of the Viennese insurgents and numerous articles linking these events with "indigenous (Spanish) fascism". El Socialista wrote on 14 February: "The fascist front has been formed in Austria against the proletariat under the direction of Jesuitical clericalism, exactly as it is being formed in Spain with the participation of Gil Robles and for identical purposes." The events in Austria (like those in Germany a year earlier), according to Santos Juliá, "were interpreted by the Spanish socialists as a warning of what could await them if the CEDA came to power." From then on, the slogan of the Spanish socialists was to be "Vienna before Berlin". Largo Caballero explained it thus:

We cannot forget the example of Germany and how the most conscious, best prepared and capable part of the European proletariat has been destroyed. That the CEDA is going to follow the same tactical procedure as the German right is evident. And we must anticipate events... We have no other path than that of revolution, and our duty is to prepare it quickly, without loss of time, lest events overtake us and we have to regret for the rest of our lives a passivity like that of Otto Bauer.

Faced with this type of explanation of the causes of the radicalisation of the socialists, which Rey Reguillo calls "exogenous" to the socialist movement (which would have reacted to situations "external" to it), this same historian leans towards "endogenous" explanations within the movement itself. "From this approach, the change of strategy was a fully conscious option, noticeable even before their departure from the Government, when the socialists sensed that their presence in it was beginning to be threatened. The resistance at all costs to the eventuality of losing power would be, therefore, the essential explanatory key to understanding the abrupt leap towards anti-democratic positions." Del Rey Reguillo agrees with José Manuel Macarro Vera who had already highlighted that after their departure from the government "the socialists saw their social legislation threatened" and the "monopoly they had enjoyed in the labour arbitration institutions, along with the arbitrary control of many town councils", therefore the Republic "was no longer a transit station towards socialism, but an impediment to achieving it." Thus, according to Del Rey Reguillo, in the change of stance of the socialists:

The rise of fascism in Europe and its potential mimetic effects on the national political reality played a secondary role... In reality, international politics had rather little influence on the ruling elite of the Republic. And as for the alleged threat of native fascism, everything points to the fact that what the workers' left actually did was forge a mobilising myth when it was displaced from the Government.

— Fernando del Rey Reguillo (2011).

=== Road to insurrection ===
As soon as the defeat of the moderate "Besteiristas" occurred, a Mixed Commission (or "liaison commission") was formed, presided over by Largo Caballero and made up of two representatives of the PSOE, two of the UGT and two of the Socialist Youth, whose mission was to organise the revolutionary general strike and the armed insurrectionary movement that would be led by socialist militias and would count on the complicity of some military commanders.

Immediately, the Mixed Commission summoned delegations from the provinces to Madrid, which received instructions to form "revolutionary committees" at the local level coordinated by the "Provincial Boards", and which were told that "the triumph of the revolution will rest on the extent it reaches and the violence with which it occurs." Likewise, in addition to groups for sabotaging services such as electricity, gas or telephones, militias should be formed, made up of "the most determined individuals" and which would receive military instruction from the "chiefs" whom they should obey. Weapons would be obtained by seizing military depots. However, the organisation and control of the conspiratorial process was not carried out by the "liaison commission", which was limited to being a coordinating body, but rather "remained in the hands of local organisations and certain individual cadres."

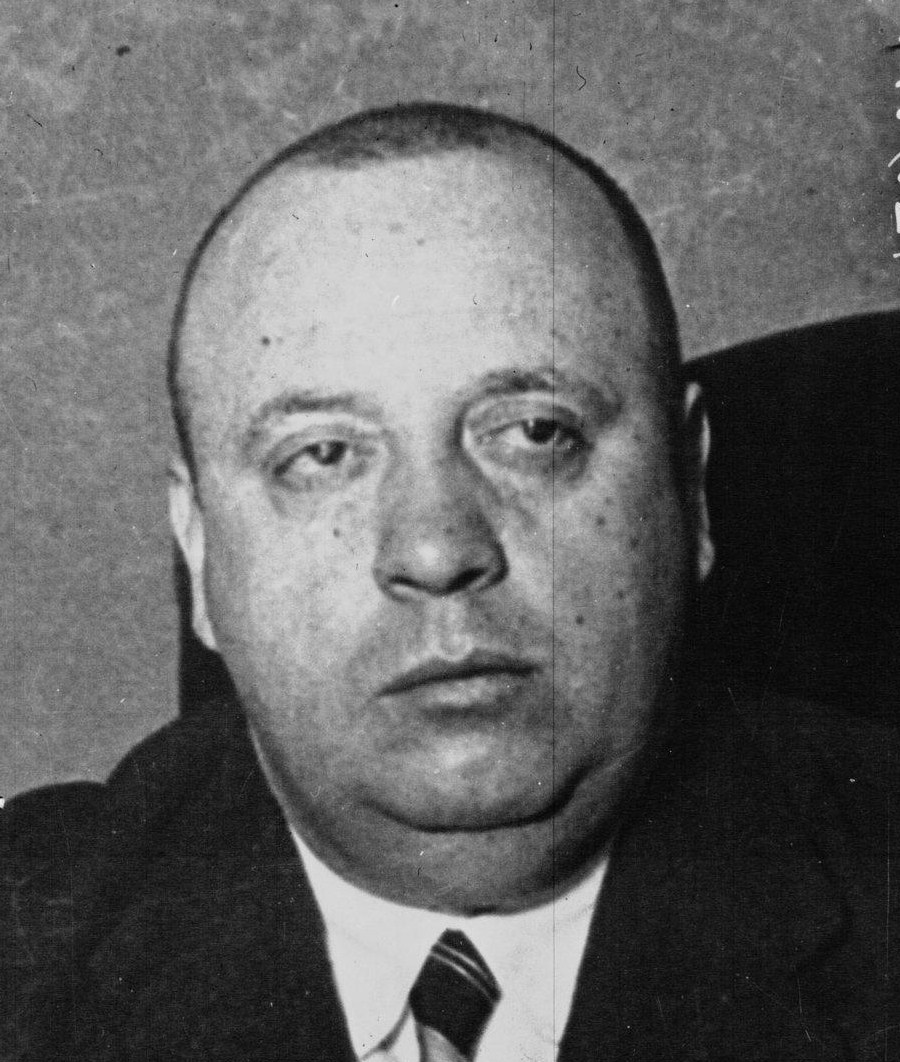
Indalecio Prieto was in charge of the military preparation of the socialist insurrection.

The Mixed Commission entrusted Indalecio Prieto with the military preparation of the movement, with the supply of weapons and the recruitment of officers in the barracks as main tasks. "The recognised capacity for work and, especially, the dense network of personal relationships that his multifaceted activity —journalist, deputy, minister— had allowed Indalecio Prieto to weave, gave him some initial success in capturing financial resources and in acquiring weapons. The former, through the decisive collaboration of radicalised young banking unionists; the latter, with the help of old personal loyalties of bourgeois origin and liberal trajectory." But Prieto's activity finally ended in a resounding failure, as he neither managed to attract army officers to the insurrection, nor did he manage to get the acquired weapons to the "revolutionary committees". According to José Luis Martín Ramos, "the preparation of the uprising accumulated one blunder after another" and in its military aspect:

...turned out to be a bad farce, with repeated seizures by the police of the few batches of weapons that were obtained, anecdotes of amateurs, falling into the traps of swindlers and the major episode of the Turquesa incident on the beaches of Asturias. The landing of the cargo of that ship —a adapted fishing trawler— with its five hundred Mauser rifles and 24 machine guns, plus abundant ammunition, was interrupted by the Carabineros, preventing almost three-quarters of the arsenal from reaching Madrid.

— José Luis Martín Ramos (2015).

Nor was the political and strategic preparation of the uprising any better, as demonstrated by the fact that the FNTT led by Ricardo Zabalza called a peasant strike in June 1934, despite the opposition of Largo Caballero himself, who could not get Zabalza to desist. It served for the Minister of the Interior Salazar Alonso to unleash a strong repression "that dismantled peasant socialist trade unionism", so "the countryside would not be alongside the city at the time of the revolutionary movement [and] the public order forces would have one less front to attend to," José Luis Martín Ramos has pointed out. A similar situation was repeated three months later when on 8 September the Madrid federation of the UGT, again without the authorisation of the national leadership, called a general strike in protest at the rally to be held that day by the Catalan agrarian owners grouped in the Catalan Agricultural Institute of Saint Isidore and opposed to the Cultivation Contracts Law approved by the Parliament of Catalonia, and which the workers' organisations of the capital considered a "fascist provocation". As the strike was clearly illegal and without prior notice, Ricardo Samper's government closed the Casa del Pueblo and arrested several workers' leaders, including the entire UGT Executive, except for Largo Caballero, due to his parliamentary immunity. Three days later, during a search of the Casa del Pueblo, the police found an important weapons depot, which led to more arrests of UGT members. According to González Calleja and other historians, "the abbreviated balance of the strike was simply calamitous: a real nonsense that harmed the movement that was being organised... it managed to dismantle the UGT in Madrid even before October."

On the other hand, there were disagreements on some important issues. At the joint meeting of the Executives of the PSOE and the UGT held on 2 July, Indalecio Prieto and Fernando de los Ríos voted against the majority that approved that after the revolutionary movement a Government "exclusively of the Socialist Party" would be formed. Nor was there agreement on what the socialist deputies should do when the insurrection began, whether they should stay in the Cortes or leave them, and finally nothing was decided. According to González Calleja and other historians, these disagreements would respond:

...to the coexistence of two divergent and hardly reconcilable strategies: the one that understood the rebellion as a means of pressure and negotiation on the Government and the Head of State to avoid the authoritarian retreat of the Republic, and the one that admitted the possibility of a violent rupture of an openly revolutionary tone". The first would be the one defended by Indalecio Prieto, the second the one embodied by Francisco Largo Caballero.

— Eduardo González Calleja and others (2015).

Regarding the search for alliances, the only step Largo Caballero took was to support the Worker Alliances promoted by small proletarian organisations, such as Communist Left or the Workers and Peasants' Bloc (BOC), which understood them as "anti-fascist alliances" —in fact, in February 1934 Largo Caballero met in Barcelona with Joaquín Maurín, leader of the BOC—. However, he never contemplated them "as backbone platforms of the revolutionary movement, but simply as instances of relationship between organisations that could facilitate support for the socialist initiative," José Luis Martín Ramos has pointed out. On the other hand, Largo Caballero never sought the support of the left republicans. The "Caballerist" Amaro del Rosal went so far as to state that "the republicans already produced aversion."

The occasion for the uprising arose upon the return from the parliamentary recess that ended on 1 October 1934, when the CEDA made known that it was withdrawing its support from Samper's centre-right government and demanded to be part of the government. Alcalá Zamora entrusted the resolution of the crisis to the leader of the Radical Party, Alejandro Lerroux, who acceded to the Cedist demand and formed the new government on 4 October with the inclusion of three ministers from the CEDA. That same day, the socialist revolutionary committee called the general revolutionary strike that would begin at 0:00 hours on 5 October. The CNT abstained from supporting the call, except in Asturias.

The entry of the CEDA into the government, according to Ranzato:

...was not a pretext, but the main cause of the ill-advised attempt at revolution that, otherwise, it is not certain that at any time would have actually been carried out. They [the socialists] were preparing it and announcing it, but they did not think they would have to carry it out immediately. And, as would be seen, they were far from being able to achieve it successfully. Outside of an emotionally overwhelming circumstance, such as the fear of a Gil Robles/Dollfuss coming to power, it is unlikely that they would have launched themselves into such an adventure, especially with such inadequate means to achieve their objectives. [...] They had limited themselves to threatening to make the revolution if the CEDA entered the government, with the idea that this would be enough to prevent it. Many testimonies indicate that such was the conviction of the main leaders of the PSOE. They were thus trapped in their own threat and were forced to act when their adversaries, put on alert, were already prepared to crush their attempts.

— Gabriel Ranzato (2014).

Thus, the socialists would present the revolutionary movement as a form of "defence of the republican legitimacy against the legality held by the Radical-Cedist Cabinet [when it was formed], as a defensive insurrection aimed both at protecting the working masses from fascism and at correcting the course of the bourgeois Republic towards the revolutionary orientation that the Spanish workers' movement had never renounced," Julio Gil Pecharromán has noted. Indeed, as Santos Juliá has also pointed out, "the socialists did not intend with their announcements of revolution to defend republican legality against an attack by the CEDA, but to respond to an alleged provocation in order to advance towards socialism. Partly for that reason and partly because they never believed that the president of the Republic and the Radical Party itself would allow the CEDA to accede to the government, they solemnly committed themselves, from the Cortes and from the press, to the fact that if this occurred, they would unleash a revolution." In this way, "the socialists demonstrated identical repudiation of the representative institutional system that the anarchists had practiced in previous years," Casanova has pointed out. However, González Calleja and other historians have qualified that:

...the argument that an armed insurrection violated the current republican democratic legality (an argument as powerful then as it is now) was strongly counterbalanced by what the international reality of the 1930s offered, for that argument ignored what was very evident in continental Europe at the time: it was through republican democratic legality that the regimes of Hitler and Dollfuss had been created, and very particularly the latter, and it was through that legality that socialism had been finished off in those countries and not only it.

— Eduardo González Calleja and others (2015).

=== Insurrectionary strike ===
The announced "general revolutionary strike" began on 5 October and was followed practically in almost all cities (but not in the countryside, which had just emerged from its own strike), but the armed insurrection was reduced, except in Asturias, to some shootings and no important town remained in the power of the revolutionaries, fundamentally due to inadequate preparation. And because the insurrection failed completely in Madrid.

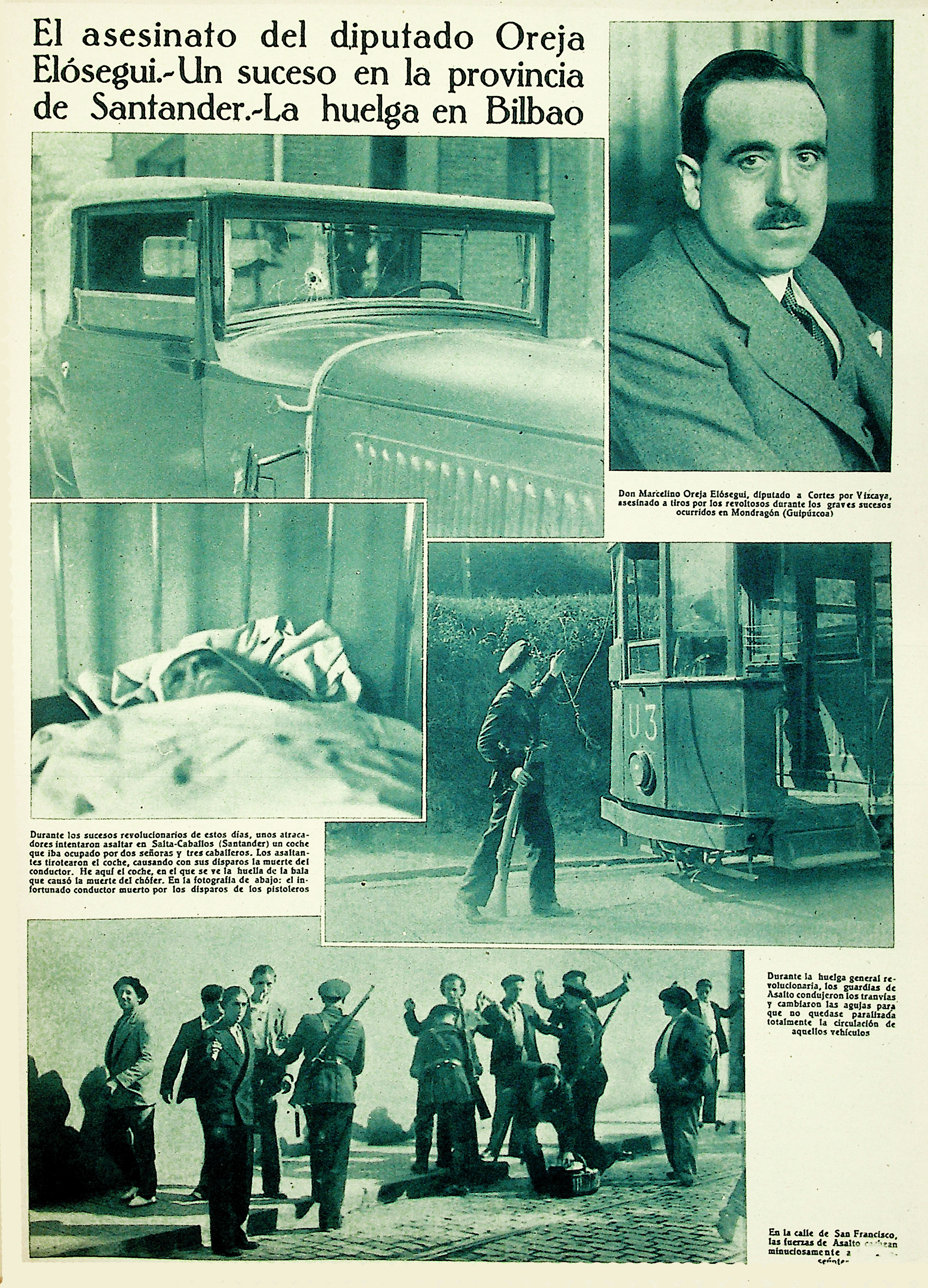
Page of the magazine Mundo Gráfico of 17 October 1934 with various photographs of what happened during the insurrection. Top right the Traditionalist leader and deputy Marcelino Oreja, one of the victims of the Revolution of 1934 in the Basque Country.

In Madrid, where the general strike was widely followed, five groups of not too numerous insurgent militiamen, one of them commanded by Fernando de Rosa Lenccini (an Italian anti-fascist, close collaborator of Largo Caballero), tried to occupy the Ministry of the Interior and some military installations, but did not succeed, although shootings, some of some intensity, continued until 8 October, when almost all members of the socialist revolutionary committee were arrested. One of the purposes of the rebels was to arrest the President of the Republic Niceto Alcalá Zamora, a mission entrusted to Fernando de Rosa.

In the Basque Country, where the Basque nationalists did not second the uprising, the strike continued in some places until 12 October. The fiercest armed clashes occurred in the mining area of Biscay where the Army and the Civil Guard had to fight the insurgents. At least forty people died, mostly strikers shot by the guards. In Eibar and Mondragón, the violent actions of the insurgents caused several victims, including the prominent Traditionalist leader and deputy Marcelino Oreja.

Everywhere, except in Asturias, the insurrection failed because the committed socialist militants waited for the barracks doors to open and the soldiers to join the "revolutionary people", but that never happened. On the contrary, the Army, by proclaiming the government's "state of war", was the one that led the restoration of order. In reality, the insurrection lacked genuine planning, political and military. The revolution also failed because it did not have the support of the CNT, except in Asturias, and because it could not count on the rural labourers, "exhausted and disorganised after the disastrous mobilisations of the spring," Julio Gil Pecharromán has pointed out.

=== Proclamation of the Catalan State within the Spanish Federal Republic ===
Around 8 p.m. on Saturday, 6 October, the day after the start of the revolutionary general strike in Catalonia called by the Worker Alliance, the government of the Generalitat presided over by Lluís Companys announced that it was breaking all relations with "the falsified institutions" of the Republic (as all left republican parties had already done upon learning of the CEDA's entry into the government) and then proclaimed, as on 14 April 1931, "the Catalan State within the Spanish Federal Republic" as a measure against "the monarchical and fascist forces... that had seized power". Companys then invited the "leaders of the general protest against fascism" to "establish the Provisional Government of the Republic in Catalonia". However, this breach of legality had no connection with the workers' revolution underway, as proven by the fact that the Generalitat refused to arm the revolutionaries and even acted against them.

But the lack of planning (despite the fact that the conseller de Governació, Josep Dencàs, mobilised the escamots, the militias of Esquerra, and the Mozos de Escuadra) and the passivity with which the main workers' force in Catalonia, the CNT, responded, meant that the Catalan rebellion quickly ended on 7 October by the intervention of the Army led by General Domingo Batet, whose moderate action prevented many more casualties (eight soldiers and thirty-eight civilians died).

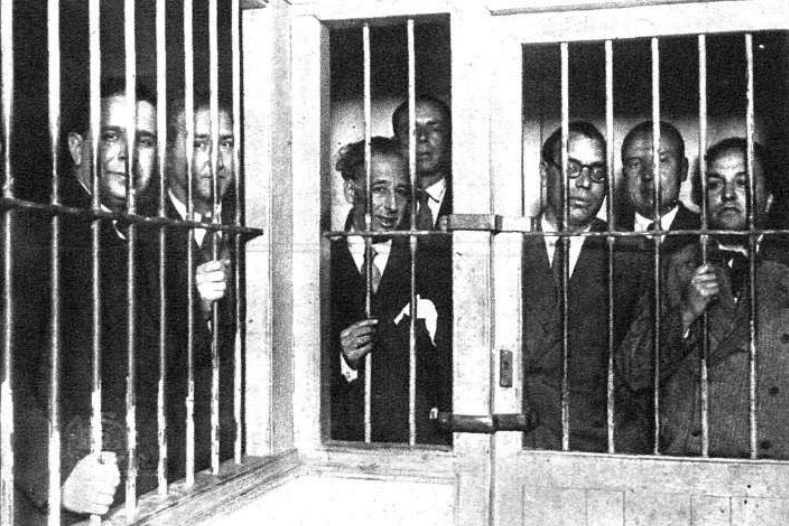
The president of the Generalitat of Catalonia Lluís Companys (centre) and the consellers of his government imprisoned.

The president and the consellers of the Generalitat were imprisoned (except Dencàs who managed to escape). Also arrested was Manuel Azaña, who happened to be in Barcelona and had nothing to do with the events (but was not released until almost three months later). Subsequently, the Statute of Autonomy of Catalonia of 1932 was suspended and all organs of the autonomous administration were suspended and temporarily replaced by a military governor, Colonel Francisco Jiménez Arenas, "an act considered a humiliation by Catalanists", according to Luis Palacios Bañuelos. In addition, Public Order powers returned to the central Government, as well as other transferred services in labour, health and welfare, "for the duration of the serious abnormality and disturbance produced in the autonomous region." Finally, the Cortes approved a law on 2 January 1935 that agreed to the indefinite suspension of the Statute (the monarchist right demanded its definitive repeal), so Catalonia came under the authority of a governor general appointed by the central government: the first was the liberal Manuel Portela Valladares, followed, from 23 April, by the radical Juan Pich y Pon. Francesc Cambó, leader of the Lliga, allied with the government, complained that the suspension of the Statute was "a punishment for an entire people".

=== Revolution of Asturias ===
In Asturias, unlike the rest of Spain where the insurrectionary movement failed, a genuine attempt at social revolution did occur: the "Red October". The reasons for the "Asturian exception" must be sought in the fact that there the CNT did join the Worker Alliance together with the hegemonic workers' organisation, the UGT (the Communist Party of Spain joined very late after having fought the Alliance for months), and, above all, in the fact that the insurrection was meticulously prepared, with calls for previous general strikes, and the supply of weapons and dynamite obtained through small thefts in factories and mines, as well as the training of militia groups. A proof that the Worker Alliance was very mature in Asturias was the general strike called in the Principality on 8 and 9 September on the occasion of the large concentration in Covadonga of the Popular Action Youth. During it, the leader of the CEDA, José María Gil Robles, gave "a speech full of threats," according to Ángeles Barrio Alonso.

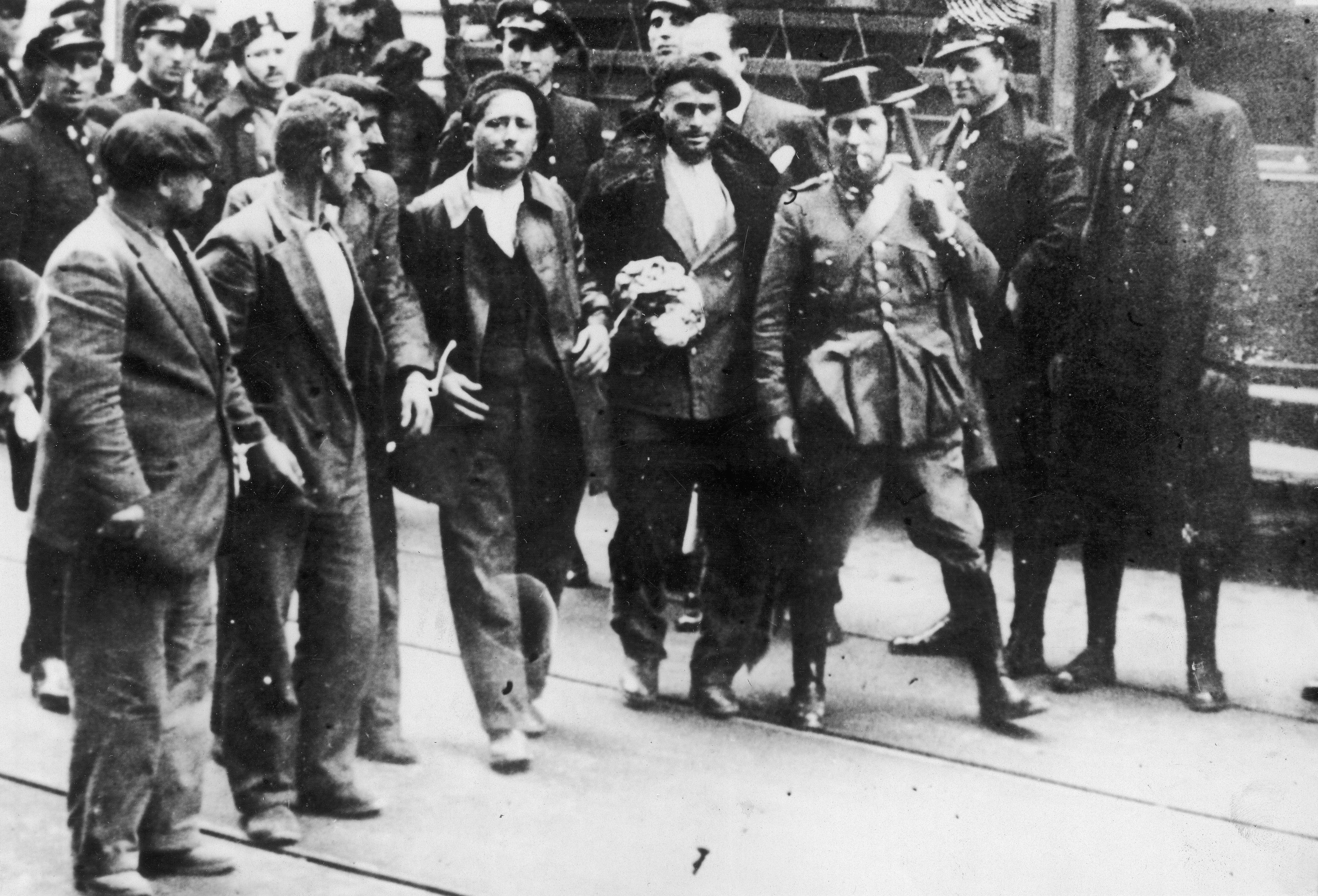
Workers arrested by Civil Guards and Assault Guards during the Revolution of Asturias.

The insurrection began on the night of 5 to 6 October when the workers' militias, made up of some twenty thousand workers, mostly miners, quickly took control of the Nalón and Caudal basins and then seized Gijón and Avilés and entered the capital Oviedo, although they could not completely occupy it (violent fighting between order forces and revolutionaries took place in the city centre). A "revolutionary committee", led by the socialist deputy Ramón González Peña, coordinated the local committees that emerged in all the towns and tried to maintain the "revolutionary order" (in some places money was even abolished), although it could not prevent the wave of violence unleashed against property owners, right-wingers and religious figures. Of the latter, thirty-four were murdered (something that had not happened in Spain since 1834–1835), in addition to fifty-eight churches and convents being burned, the episcopal palace, the Seminary and the Holy Chamber of the Cathedral of Oviedo, which was dynamited. Also murdered were thirty Civil Guard agents immediately after being taken prisoner in Sama de Langreo.

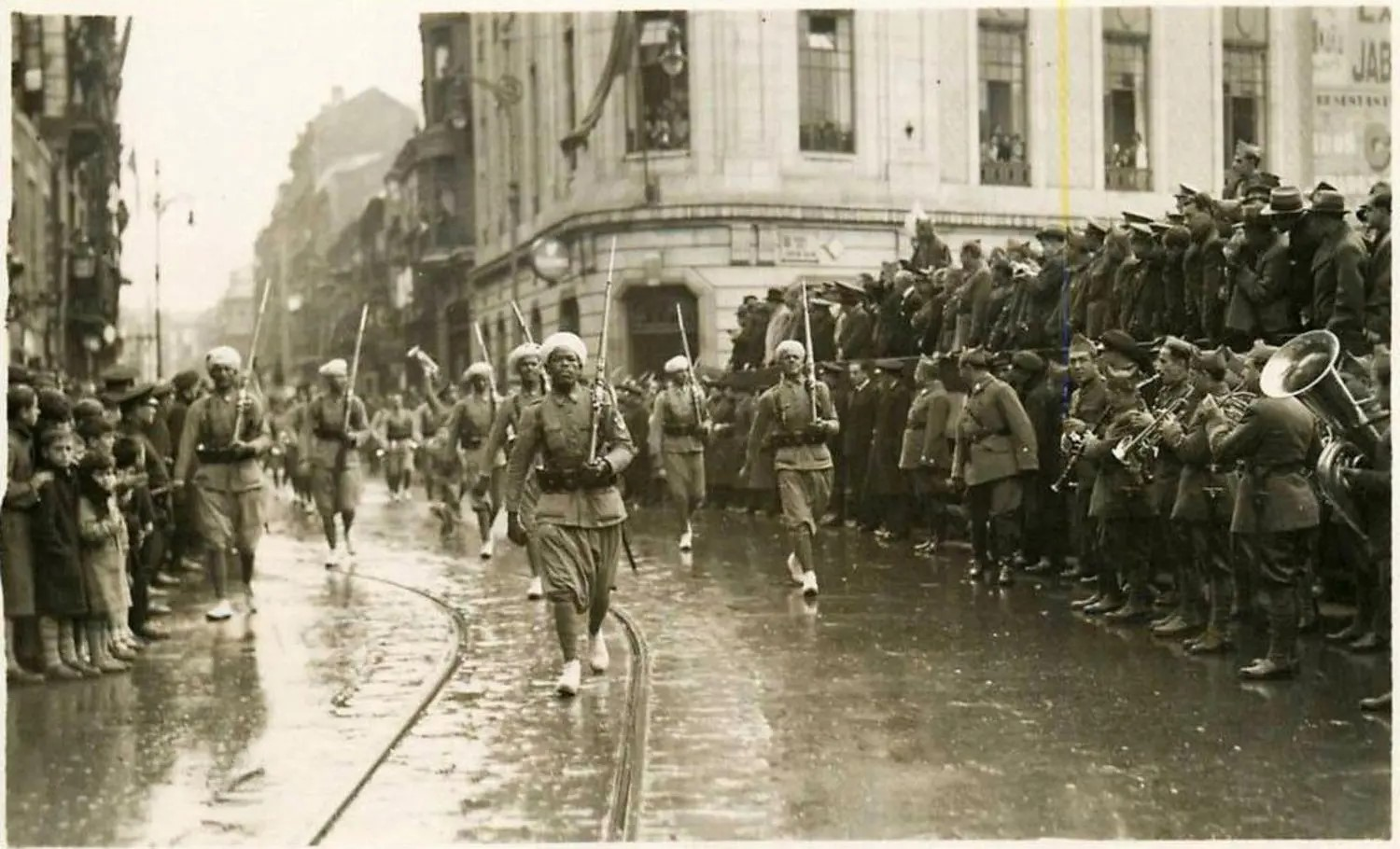
Colonial troops entering Gijón.

On 10 October, colonial troops (two battalions of legionaries and two of regulares from Africa, under the command of Colonel Yagüe) landed in Gijón, while a column under the command of General Eduardo López Ochoa reached Oviedo from Galicia. The entire operation was being directed from Madrid by General Franco, at the express request of the Minister of War Diego Hidalgo. On the 14th, faced with the advance of government troops, Ramón González Peña ordered a retreat into the mountains, although some groups of militiamen refused to obey and continued fighting in the streets of Oviedo. On 18 October, the insurgents surrendered, following negotiations between the new leader of the rebellion, Belarmino Tomás, and General López Ochoa. The casualty count was eleven hundred dead and two thousand wounded among the insurgents, and about three hundred dead among the security forces and the army. "The fight had been fierce, merciless, and the repressive action carried out by the military and the Civil Guard often took on vengeful characteristics, with harsh mistreatment, torture and expeditious executions of prisoners," Gabriele Ranzato has stated.

As Ranzato has highlighted, in the history of insurrectionary movements in Spain "nothing comparable had ever happened." "On both sides, violence was exercised against defenceless men and deaths were caused outside of combat. And the greater gravity of such conduct on the part of those who should have represented law and order is evident. The fact, moreover, that the government and a large part of the country's ruling class reacted to the revolutionary aggression immediately after the events with more spirit of vengeance and reprisal than with severe justice, brought the most disastrous consequences. The conflicts, instead of dying down, would flare up again in an increasingly acute form until they led to the Civil War." The American historian Gabriel Jackson also characterized the Revolution of Asturias as the "tragic prologue to the civil war", which does not imply that, as the propaganda of the Francoist dictatorship did a posteriori to justify the military uprising against the Republic, the "Revolution of 1934" constituted "the first act of the Civil War". As Alberto Reig Tapia already pointed out in 1999, cited by González Calleja and other historians:

...no matter how great the supposed political bipolarisation, if the State is not questioned by a faction of rebel soldiers, there is no civil war. There may be riots, revolts, terrorism, more or less lasting urban or rural insurgency, greater or lesser numbers of dead..., but not civil war.

— Eduardo González Calleja and others (2015).

=== Interpretations of the "October Revolution" by the right and left ===
The essential element around which the right-wing interpretation of the "October Revolution" revolved was considering it as the work of the "Anti-Spain", of the "Anti-Fatherland", in a "mythical-symbolic" vision in which the Fatherland, Spain, was identified with the values and ideas of the right. Conservative newspapers (such as ABC, the mouthpiece of the anti-republican and anti-democratic right of Spanish Renovation, or El Debate, linked to the Catholic "accidentalist" right of the CEDA), described the revolutionaries as "beasts", as non-human beings whose only instinct was only to kill and destroy, so their final destiny was to be dead or imprisoned. Honorio Maura Gamazo in the daily ABC of 16 October described the Asturian insurgents as "repugnant jackals who do not deserve to be either Spaniards or human beings."

This idea of Spain of the right was embodied in the relationship of the Fatherland with the Army, as expressed by José Calvo Sotelo, leader of the far-right monarchists, in a famous speech in which he defined the Army as the "vertebral column of the Fatherland, [which] if it breaks, if it bends, if it creaks, Spain breaks, bends or creaks with it." Honorio Maura wrote in ABC: "Nowadays, all of Spain is in uniform." And Ramiro de Maeztu also in ABC: "The Army is civilisation... the Army is Spain." In contrast, the repressive action of the troops that crushed the uprising is barely mentioned. The destruction in "Asturias, the martyr", and above all in "Oviedo, the martyr", was attributed exclusively to the revolutionaries.

Finally, the anti-republican right took advantage of the insurrection to incite a "true and saving revolution for Spain". For it, the "red-separatist" revolution of October, as they called it, was proof that the "anti-Spanish revolution" was underway and that it could only be defeated by force. Already on 8 October, Calvo Sotelo wrote in La Época: "The country demands the scalpel, pruning, implacable surgery... And Spain demands harsh punishment so that for a long time these poisonous and fratricidal plants that have already caused so much bloodshed do not resound on our soil." A month later, Calvo Sotelo specified his proposal in a speech in the Cortes. He proposed the "disappearance of the democratic system, replaced by a civil-military dictatorship." That same month of November, the Manifesto of the National Bloc, led by Calvo Sotelo himself, was made public, beginning with the words: "The October Revolution has shaken our most sensitive fibres with the lash of its barbarism."

In conclusion, as historian Julio Gil Pecharromán has pointed out, "October reaffirmed in the right, and especially in the monarchists, the conviction that if the State had reacted this time in time, it had not been due to the efficiency of the [republican democratic] political institutions, but to the determination of the Armed Forces to act quickly and forcefully. The Army thus constituted the last guarantee, the reserve of traditional forces against revolutionary change, which the parliamentary regime seemed incapable of conjuring."

That lightning-fast experiment in revolution, brief but extraordinarily bloody, continued to obsess, with all its images of atrocities, true or invented, all those who, by economic and social position, political convictions and religious feelings, could fear being victims of its replica.

— Gabriele Ranzato.

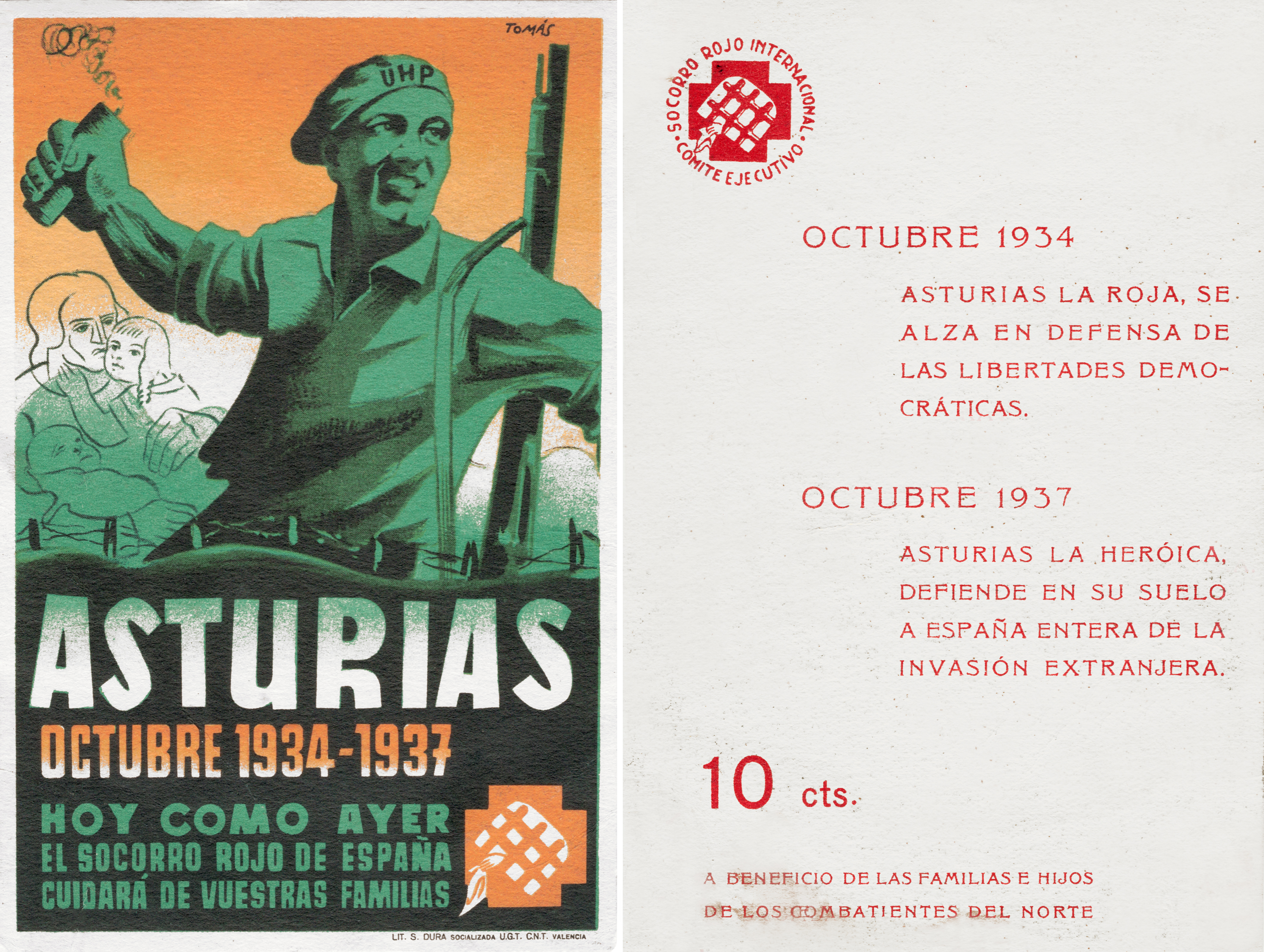
1937 postcard of International Red Aid to raise funds for the Republican side during the Spanish Civil War appealing to the "myth of Asturias" of 1934 ("Red Asturias") revived in 1937 ("Heroic Asturias") ready to halt the advance towards the Principality of the Francoist side.

For their part, the left did not condemn the insurrection, but justified it on the grounds that the entry of "the enemies of the Republic" into the Government had been allowed. It had not been a mistake (or a failure), but an act of legitimate defence. "October" was considered a "heroic" enterprise turned into a myth "thanks to the sacrificial appendix of the harsh and long repression," which "would continue to fuel hopes of redemption and spirit of vengeance," Ranzato has pointed out.

Except for Julián Besteiro and his followers, the leaders and cadres of the PSOE spoke of "October" in terms of justification and glorification, as a feat that had shown the vitality of the Spanish proletariat in the fight against its "class" enemies... Certainly "October" ended up becoming a myth that reinforced victimhood and justified the high price paid by the organisation and its cadres. Hence it continued to be fuelled by propaganda that highlighted the ferocity of the "repression" practiced under military jurisdiction and the urgent civil courts.

— Manuel Álvarez Tardío and Roberto Villa García (2017).

These historians have also highlighted the gravity of the fact that "the republican left did not unequivocally condemn that insurrection" because:

...that decision gave the socialists' action a moral backing that was fundamental in the medium term and served to delegitimise in the eyes of the centre-left electorate the option that the Lerrouxists had proposed: centring the Republic and attracting a part of the Catholic right to the system, laying the foundations for a subsequent revision of the 1931 Republic.

— Manuel Álvarez Tardío and Roberto Villa García (2017).

After the civil war, already in exile, Indalecio Prieto himself acknowledged that the revolution had only served to "deepen the political abyss that divided Spain." And in a speech given in Mexico City in 1942, he declared himself "guilty before my conscience, before the Socialist Party and before all of Spain, of my participation in that revolutionary movement. I declare it as guilt, as sin; not as glory."

=== Government repression ===
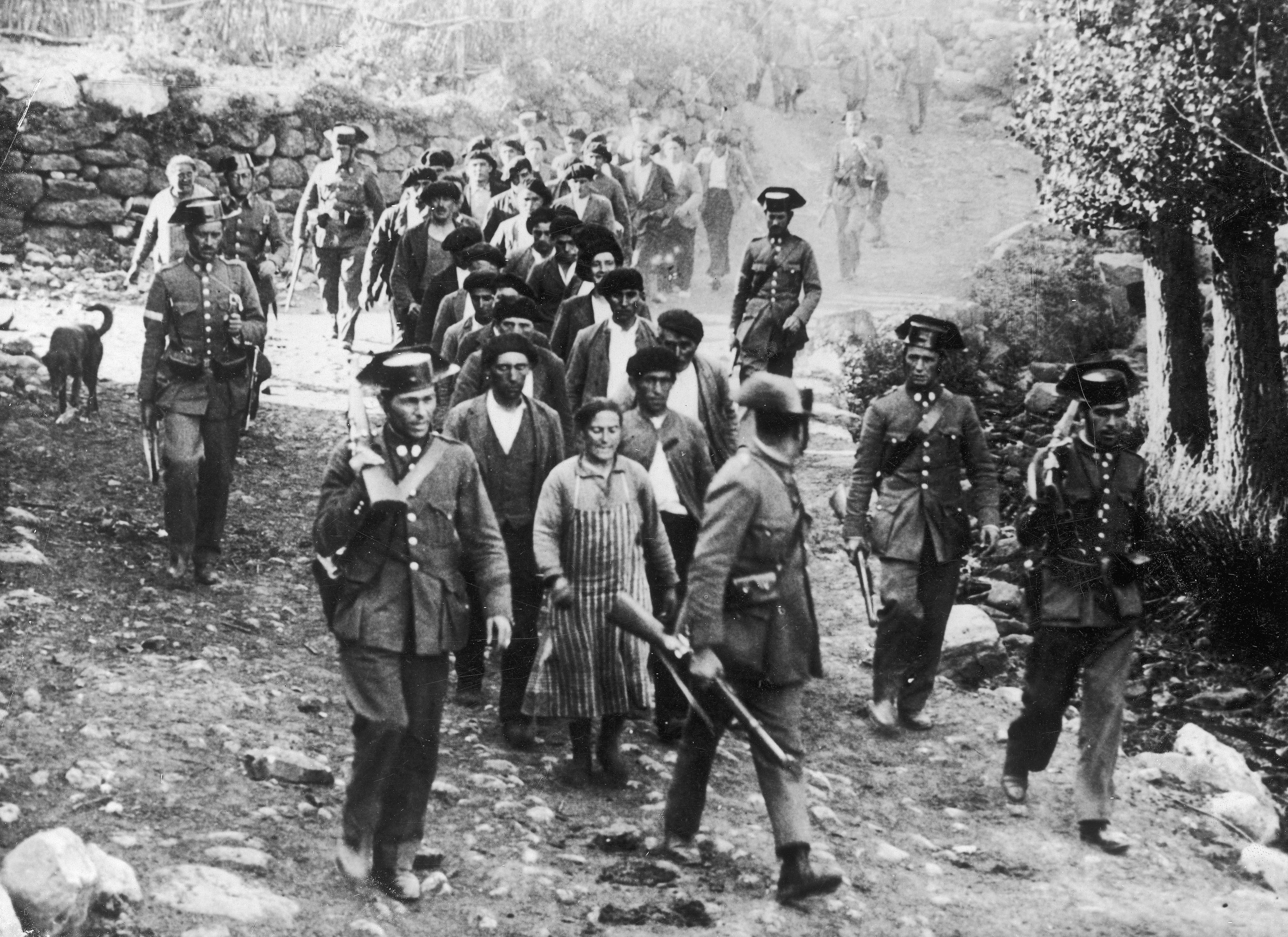
Column of detainees guarded by the Civil Guard in Brañosera, north of the province of Palencia.

Some thirty thousand prisoners were taken throughout Spain, and a year later about eight thousand remained in prison (although the left would maintain the figure of "the 30,000" as a slogan in the February 1936 elections). The Asturian mining basins were subjected to extremely harsh repression by the Army (there were summary executions of alleged insurgents) and the Civil Guard, the latter led by Commander Lisardo Doval. There was torture of detainees, from which several of them died. The harsh repression was encouraged by an intense campaign in the right-wing press, especially the anti-republican daily ABC and the Catholic "accidentalist" El Debate, demanding reprisals especially for the murder by the insurgents of thirty-four religious figures (including the martyrs of Turón) and several civil guards and civilians of conservative ideology. Likewise, numerous left-wing leaders were arrested, including the socialist revolutionary committee led by Francisco Largo Caballero, and the military courts handed down twenty death sentences, although only two were carried out, thanks to the President of the Republic Niceto Alcalá Zamora commuting them to life imprisonment, resisting pressure from the CEDA and Spanish Renovation who demanded much harsher repression. The centre-right leader Melquiades Álvarez went so far as to ask for the policy of Adolphe Thiers in the repression of the Paris Commune during which thousands of communards were shot. The far-right leader José Calvo Sotelo did the same, stating in a speech in the Cortes that "the 40,000 executions of the Commune ensured sixty years of social peace." (Currently, historian Stanley G. Payne has again wielded the same "argument" as Calvo Sotelo, after qualifying as "weak" the repression of the October Revolution: "Terrible as the repression of the Paris communards in 1871 was, for example, it may have contributed to the early stabilisation of the French Republic of the middle classes during the seventies and eighties (from the 19th century)".)

The first to be tried by military courts were Commander Enrique Pérez Farrás and Captains Frederic Escofet and Ricart, who had been in command of the Mozos de Escuadra involved in the Catalan insurrection. They were sentenced to death and the government ratified the sentence on 17 October, but the President of the Republic Niceto Alcalá-Zamora managed to get Prime Minister Lerroux, after reminding him that those involved in the Sanjurjada had been amnestied, to endorse on 31 October the commutation of the death sentences (a measure of grace extended to another twenty sentenced to the ultimate penalty), despite strong opposition from the CEDA (Gil Robles went so far as to sound out the possibility of a "solution of force" by the army to restore the "legality violated by the president" of the Republic) and the party of Melquiades Álvarez. The next to be prosecuted were the President of the Catalan Generalitat Lluís Companys and the rest of the consellers, who were each sentenced to 30 years in prison for "military rebellion". Regarding the Asturian revolutionaries, 17 death sentences were handed down, of which only two were carried out (an army sergeant who had gone over to the side of the insurgents and a worker accused of several murders). Precisely, the commutation of the death sentence for two of the socialist leaders of the "Revolution of Asturias", Ramón González Peña and Teodomiro Menéndez on 29 March 1935 caused a serious crisis within the government as the three CEDA ministers, the agrarian and the liberal-democrat voted against, and resigned.

Luis Palacios Bañuelos has pointed out that the reaction of the right "had nothing to do with what the left had predicted: neither was the Socialist Party legally suspended, as had happened in Austria, nor was the Statute of Catalonia abolished, although it was temporarily suspended. In short, the much-vaunted and feared fascism that had been the justification for the revolutionary movement was not waiting around the corner." Indeed, neither the PSOE nor the UGT were outlawed (nor was Republican Left of Catalonia, Companys's party), but, as Álvarez Tardío and Villa García have pointed out, "the socialist organisation itself was dismantled. A good portion of its mayors and provincial deputies were dismissed for their involvement in the events. Not a few of its political headquarters, the Casas del Pueblo, were closed and its press silenced for months. Part of its national leaders and its political and trade union cadres were imprisoned awaiting trial; others avoided the courts by fleeing abroad. The UGT lost members and saw its presence in mixed juries or union actions notably diminish." For his part, Nigel Townson has pointed out that "left-wing sympathisers were indiscriminately persecuted and demonised throughout Spain," which Rey Reguillo has confirmed in his study on the province of Ciudad Real. Certainly, Rey Reguillo states, "as far as is known, the repression does not seem to have been either bloody or brutal in this province" (hundreds of socialists were imprisoned, councillors and mayors of this political sign were dismissed, and about seventy trials were held in which the majority of those convicted received light sentences), but if we look at the "repressive intrahistory", it is observed that:

...in the months following the failed insurrection, the socialists had a very hard time in many towns (reprisals against the most prominent militants, lack of work due to the siege raised against them by the employers, beatings at the hands of the municipal police or the Civil Guard...). The security forces dependent on the town councils, duly purged, became a kind of local "political police" under the dictates of the conservative management commissions constituted after the insurrection.

— Fernando del Rey Reguillo (2012).

On the other hand, the government never considered amnestying the thousands of imprisoned, many of whom had been convicted for the mere fact of having seconded the strike, but without having participated in the armed insurrection. Many intellectuals, such as Miguel de Unamuno, denounced the violence and torture suffered by the prisoners, achieving wide repercussion in the international press. The French socialist Vincent Auriol handed Lerroux thousands of signatures collected in France requesting amnesty, and the writer Albert Camus wrote the drama Révolte dans les Asturies. Although "perhaps what most impacted public opinion was the persecution to which Azaña was subjected," Gabriele Ranzato has stated. "An attempt was made to involve him in a trial where it was eventually proven that he had not intervened, and with that, his popularity only increased," Luis Palacios Bañuelos has pointed out, agreeing with Ranzato.

==== Trial of Manuel Azaña ====
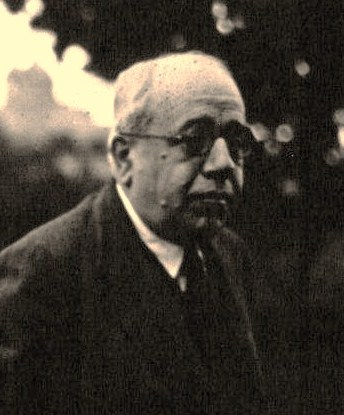
Former Prime Minister Manuel Azaña was arrested in Barcelona for his alleged involvement in the revolution. He was in prison for three months until 24 December, when the Supreme Court ordered his release for lack of evidence.

On Tuesday, 9 October, while in Madrid the right was acclaiming Lerroux's government in the Cortes with shouts of "Long live Spain!", the police arrested former Prime Minister Manuel Azaña in Barcelona, who the following day was interned on the prison ship "Ciudad de Cádiz" anchored in the port of Barcelona. There he made his first statement to General Sebastián Pozas, who became convinced that Azaña had not participated in the rebellion of the Generalitat of Catalonia. Despite this, Prime Minister Lerroux, euphoric, stated that same day 10 to the press that "a very extensive and interesting documentation" had been seized from Azaña, "the documentation of a political man who is going to carry out an enterprise as important as the one that took Azaña to Barcelona" (which turned out to be completely false). On 13 October, the Attorney General of the Republic filed a complaint for the crime of rebellion before the Supreme Court, which was the competent body to judge a deputy like Azaña, and requested that a waiver of immunity be requested from the Cortes to be able to try him. On 31 October, Azaña was transferred first to the warships "Alcalá Galiano" and then to the "Sánchez Barcáiztegui", where he was treated with greater consideration. There he received hundreds of letters and telegrams of solidarity and support every day.

While he was a prisoner, an important group of intellectuals addressed an open letter to the Government on 14 November denouncing the "persecution" of Azaña, but censorship prevented the letter from appearing in the newspapers. It was the first time that the action against Azaña was publicly described as "persecution". The letter "To the public opinion" was signed, among others, by Azorín, Luis Bagaría, José Bergamín, Alejandro Casona, Américo Castro, Antonio Espina, Óscar Esplá, León Felipe, García Mercadal, Juan Ramón Jiménez, Gregorio Marañón, Isabel de Palencia, Valle-Inclán and Luis de Zulueta. The Catholic "accidentalist" daily El Debate defined the signatories as "that false intellectuals without Spanish content".

On 28 November, the Cortes granted the waiver of immunity by 172 votes (radicals, Cedists, agrarians and monarchists) against 20 (with the socialists and the republican left absent). But a month later, on 24 December, the Supreme Court dismissed the complaint for lack of evidence and ordered the immediate release of Azaña. On 28 December, Azaña regained his freedom, after a dubiously legal detention that had lasted ninety days. "Azaña, persecuted, rose to become a symbolic figure of the oppressed, acquiring a popularity he had never had until then."

=== Reasons for the failure of the October Revolution ===
The historian Santos Juliá summarised the reasons for the failure of the October Revolution thus:

A revolution on a fixed date, pending a provocation that the adversary could administer at will and disconnected from the previous workers' and peasants' mobilisation, based on a deplorable armed organisation, without precise political objectives, with the abstention of a numerous sector of the unionised working class, projected as a mixture of conspiracy by supposedly loyal soldiers and a general strike on the great day, faced with a State that kept its response capacity intact, had no possibility of prospering.

This assessment is shared by various historians. José Luis Martín Ramos agrees in pointing out as causes of failure "the absence of a central political direction, the deficiencies in political and military preparation, the lack of an explicit insurrectionary plan —which could not be confused with readings of manuals on insurrectionary techniques—, the publicity given to the insurrectionary decision, the very little discretion with which it was carried out [and] the organisational sloppiness." Martín Ramos points to Largo Caballero himself as the main responsible for leaving "the greatest burden of responsibility to local organisations", for "his inexperience combined with the desire to control everything, without being able to", for "his confusion between leadership and directive function" and for the "reductionism of the insurrectionary movement to the mobilisation of one's own organisations". According to Martín Ramos, Largo Caballero's actions are ultimately explained because he was caught in the "oxymoron he had formulated, that of a 'defensive revolution', without really being convinced that neither the socialists nor the workers' movement were yet capable of an 'offensive revolution'."

For his part, Ranzato highlights that the socialists had threatened:

...to make the revolution if the CEDA entered the government, with the idea that this would be enough to prevent it. Many testimonies indicate that such was the conviction of the main leaders of the PSOE. They were thus trapped in their own threat and were forced to act when their adversaries, put on alert, were already prepared to crush their attempts. Their ruinous failure was, then, inevitable...

— Gabriele Ranzato (2014).

For Ángel Luis López Villaverde, the insurrection:

...had little preparation and lacked peasant and anarchist support. The socialist preparations were as limited as the members of the order forces supporting them were few and the governmental action quick, as it was prepared for the announced revolution. There was, therefore, no collapse or division of the mechanisms of coercion and defence of the State, so necessary for the triumph of a revolution.

— Ángel Luis López Villaverde (2017).

According to José Manuel Macarro Vera, the insurrection was the culmination of a "foolish path" product of "the political schizophrenia into which the socialists had entered, who union-wise wanted to continue with their usual evolutionary tactics, but accompanying them with a revolutionary discourse that denied them."

If the Spanish proletariat was as Largo Caballero said, if it was defenceless, if they had recently recognised that they were not a majority in any region of Spain and also warned the government publicly that they could rebel, everything led them to absurdity. A nonsense confirmed upon receiving reports from the provinces on the preparation of the future revolutionary movement: apart from a couple of them, in the others there was nothing.

— José Manuel Macarro Vera (2012).

After highlighting that "all testimonies agree that Largo Caballero maintained until the last moment his conviction that Alcalá-Zamora would not allow the CEDA to enter the Government, and therefore it would not be necessary to issue the orders for a general revolutionary strike", González Calleja and other historians point out that the socialists, "tied to their traditional discourse of maintaining acquired positions, lacked the instrumental resources (material and organisational), the subversive theory and the revolutionary political strategy that could catapult them to power alone through an armed insurrection." Furthermore, "the multiple threats uttered since the autumn of 1933... alerted the outgoing Samper Government, especially when the insurrection was announced with great fanfare as an automatic response to the foreseeable entry of the CEDA into the Cabinet."

== Radical-Cedist governments (October 1934 – September 1935) ==
Despite the fact that the socialists emerged from the "October Revolution" split and greatly weakened, "October" increased the right's fear that in a next attempt the "Bolshevik revolution" would end up triumphing. The leader of the monarchists, José Calvo Sotelo, directly proposed as an alternative the "disappearance of the democratic system, replaced by a civil-military dictatorship" that would give way to "the establishment of the neo-traditionalist monarchy and the totalitarian New State". But the leader of the CEDA, José María Gil Robles, did not second this proposal and maintained the "parliamentary path" he had undertaken after his triumph in the November 1933 elections, although accentuating pressure on his government partner, the Radical Republican Party, to carry out a more decidedly "anti-reformist" ("counter-revolutionary") policy, which did not fail to produce growing tensions between them and call into question the radicals' attempt to pursue a centrist policy. According to Santos Juliá, the defeat of the "October Revolution" had shown Gil Robles the way: it was enough to provoke continuous government crises to advance positions. An assessment shared by Ángeles Barrio Alonso:

The CEDA, which had initiated a process whose ultimate goal was to replace Lerroux with Gil Robles, systematically confronted the least submissive ministers to its programme until provoking their dismissal, a wearing down of their government partners, in short, to prepare their rise to power.

— Ángeles Barrio Alonso (2004).

"Unlike what happened in the period of the radical governments with the external support of the CEDA", during this second stage of the biennium of the radical-cedist governments, according to Gabriele Ranzato, there did occur:

...a substantial dismantling of the reforms of the first biennium. In accordance with this purpose, a large part of the municipal administrations —about two thousand— controlled by the socialists or the republican left began to be dismissed throughout the country to be replaced by management commissions largely led by radical representatives, who thus strengthened their clientelist networks. In fact, the instruments of worker protection ceased to function, especially in rural areas: employers mass-fired all those known to adhere to the left, the mixed juries were no longer convened or fell into the hands of employer representatives, wages were notably reduced. Lerroux's government also promulgated a decree limiting the right to strike, and in many industrial sectors it reintroduced the forty-eight hour week. But above all, the measures of the first biennium in favour of poor peasants were sabotaged. [...] On the other hand, although the capital sentences for those responsible for "October" had been commuted, the prisons remained full of detainees, many of whom had been convicted as authors of the insurrectionary attempt only for having participated in the general strike.

— Gabriele Ranzato.

An assessment shared by José Manuel Macarro Vera: the "catastrophe" of the socialists "now, yes, affected working conditions, and not due to the explicit action of the Executive, but because employers, especially in the countryside, began to roam freely, even irritating the social-Christian sector of the CEDA." Also shared by González Calleja and other historians: "institutional policy as a whole became even more right-wing, with the complete annulment of all opposition" and the "total loss of political and ideological initiative [of the radicals] in the face of the CEDA", although they "obstructed and caused the failure of CEDA projects in areas as varied as the reform of the Constitution —which proved unviable—, a new Associations Law promoted by Anguera de Sojo, a Press Law or electoral reform." "The star theme of the counter-reforms of 1935 was agrarian," these historians add.

=== Tensions between the Radical Party and the CEDA: entry of Gil Robles into the government ===
The first moment of tension between radicals and Cedists came immediately after the "October Revolution" when the republican centre-right parties refused to adopt the measures of implacable repression of the "October revolutionaries" demanded by the CEDA, and even so they were very harsh. On 7 November, the CEDA forced Lerroux, under threat of withdrawing its support from the government, to dismiss the Minister of War Diego Hidalgo and the Minister of State Ricardo Samper, whom the right held responsible for what happened, for not having known how to stop the Revolution. Lerroux himself took over the War portfolio. In December, it was the turn of the Minister of Education, the liberal democrat Filiberto Villalobos, who from the beginning had tried to maintain spending on education to continue with the construction of public schools and who had tried to implement some educational reforms connected with those proposed in the first biennium. He had to resign because, according to the CEDA, his ministry was still dominated by "a Marxist and revolutionary policy."

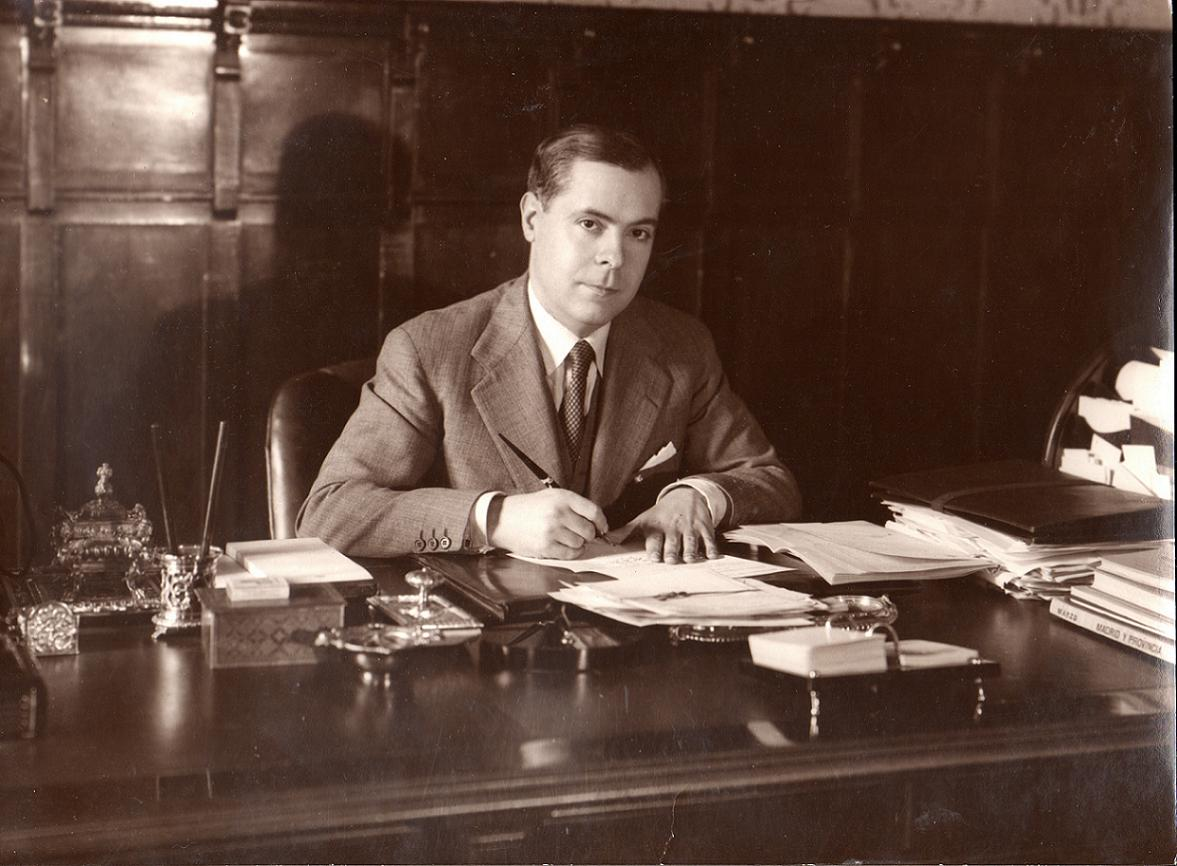
Federico Salmón in his office as the new Minister of Labour. He was one of the five CEDA ministers who entered the government of Alejandro Lerroux in early May 1935 following the crisis caused by the commutation of the death sentence for two socialist leaders of the Revolution of Asturias.

The most serious crisis provoked by the CEDA, following its strategy of eroding the radicals to accede to the presidency of the government, occurred in early April 1935, when its three ministers refused to approve the commutation of the death sentence to life imprisonment for two of the socialist leaders of the "Revolution of Asturias" (the deputies Ramón González Peña and Teodomiro Menéndez) and resigned at the indication of Gil Robles, joined by the ministers of the Agrarian Party and the Liberal Democrat (at a time when "the international repercussion of the Asturian October had become a problem for the government, due to the spread of testimonies and news of the repression"). Lerroux sought a way out by forming a government that left out the CEDA thanks to the confidence given to him by the Presidency of the Republic, which, in use of its prerogatives, suspended the sessions of the Cortes for a month. But this "domestic" government, formed exclusively by radicals and liberal-democrats (and two military men, which happened for the first time in the history of the Republic: General Carlos Masquelet in War and Vice Admiral Francisco Javier de Salas González in the Navy), as soon as the Cortes reopened in May, did not obtain the necessary parliamentary support to govern due to the opposition of the CEDA (and the Agrarian Party), so this ephemeral cabinet of Lerroux would be known as the "Government of the Thirty Days" (although it had time to end the state of war and to restore the Generalitat of Catalonia with a government controlled by the radicals and the Lliga). So the radical leader was forced to finally accept the demands of the right: the CEDA would go from three to five ministers, one of them the leader of the CEDA himself, José María Gil Robles, who demanded for himself the Ministry of War. The other four CEDA ministers, selected by Gil Robles and not by Lerroux, occupied the portfolios of Justice (Cándido Casanueva y Gorjón), Labour (Federico Salmón), Communications (Luis Lucia Lucia) and Industry and Commerce (Rafael Aizpún).

Perhaps the old radical leader [by allowing five CEDA ministers into the government] had the conviction of being able to "domesticate" the Catholic right thus, making it definitively accept the Republic and democratic alternation. But evidently Gil Robles's intention was different. His main objective was to completely change the Constitution in an authoritarian sense, not settling, therefore, for the more limited corrections proposed by Lerroux, which foresaw the pruning of its anti-clerical articles.

— Gabriele Ranzato (2014).

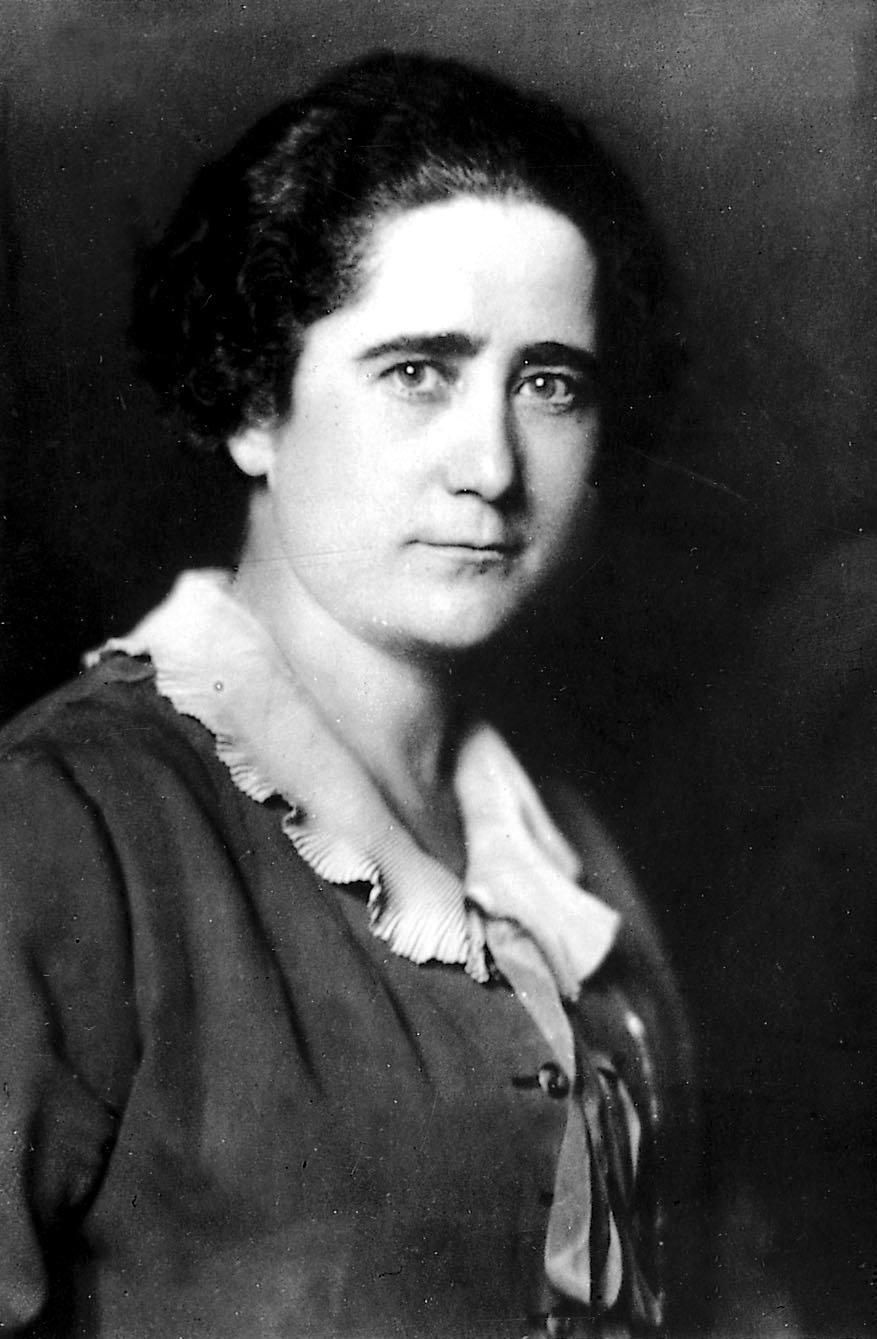
Clara Campoamor, main architect of the recognition of women's suffrage in the Constitution of 1931, left the Radical Republican Party in disagreement with the "right-wing" drift of the party.

Thus, in the new Lerroux government formed on 6 May 1935, the majority was no longer held by the republican centre-right, but by the non-republican "accidentalist" right of the CEDA (at a meeting of its National Council it had been agreed that in the event that "the party had to rejoin the Government, it had to do so obtaining the preponderance to which its parliamentary numerical strength entitled it, but, in addition, with qualitative preponderance, that is, with portfolios of notorious influence within the Ministry"), which was soon reflected in its policy being even more conservative than that of the previous radical-cedist government. Another proof of the "right-wing shift" of the new government was the replacement of the Cedist Manuel Giménez Fernández, who at the head of the Ministry of Agriculture had developed a moderate reformist policy, by Nicasio Velayos Velayos (of the Agrarian Party), who immediately set in motion a programme of agrarian "counter-reform" (the second point of the CEDA's "minimum programme"). Thus, with the new government of non-republican majority, which happened for the first time, "then the 'rectification' of the Republic really began, with the radicals, who had broken all possible bridges with the left republicans and the socialists, subjected to the will of the CEDA and the revanchist demands of employers and landowners." A symbolic fact was the decision of Clara Campoamor, the deputy who had fought hardest to achieve women's suffrage, to leave the Radical Republican Party, due to her disagreement with the increasingly right-wing policy of her party. For its part, the blasquista PURA threatened to separate from the Radical Party.

=== Agrarian policy of Giménez Fernández and "counter-reform" of Nicasio Velayos ===
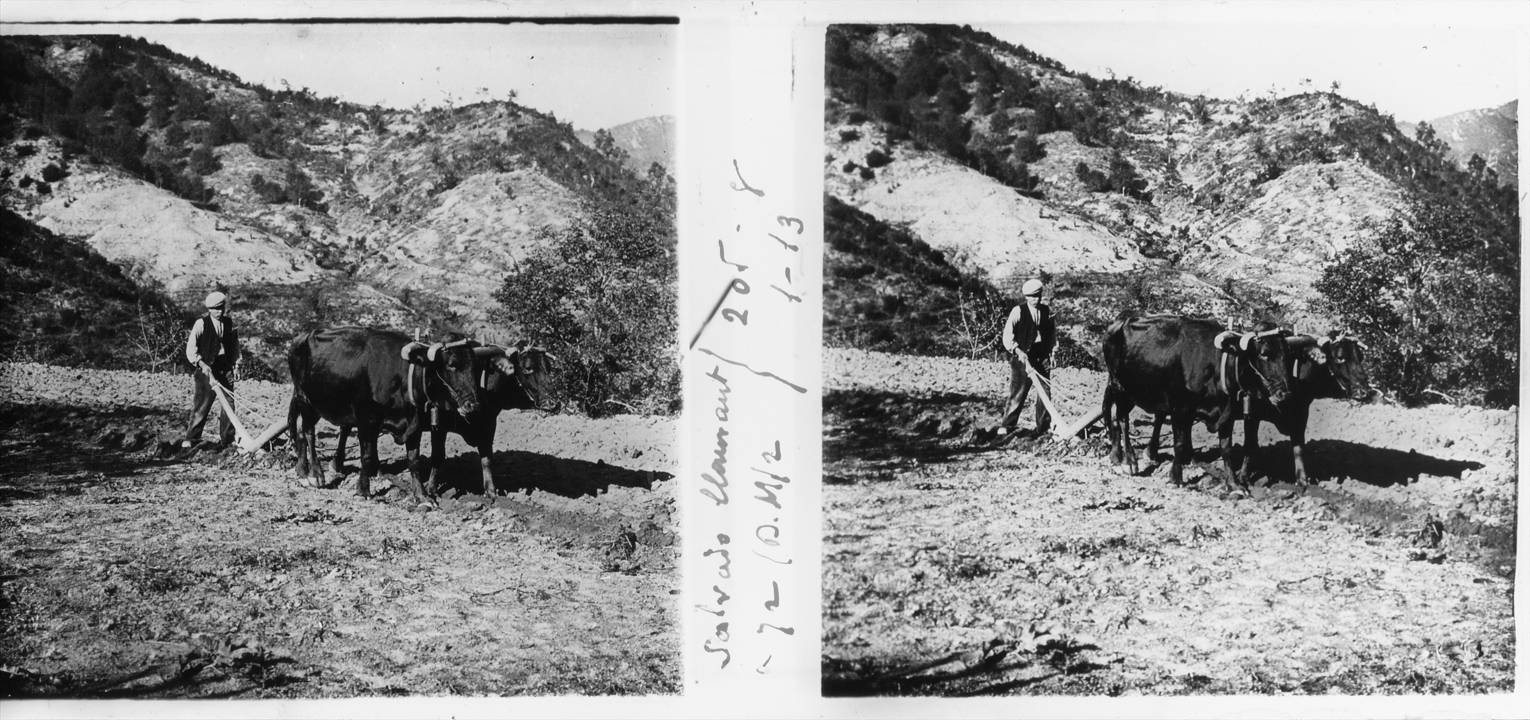
Yoke of oxen ploughing (1911).

Between October 1934 and April 1935, it was the moderate Cedist Manuel Giménez Fernández, who defended social Catholicism, who occupied the Ministry of Agriculture, from which (although he temporarily suspended the expropriations established by the Agrarian Reform Law of 1932) he extended reformist legislation with the Yunteros Law of 21 December 1934, which extended the occupation of land by Extremaduran peasants, thus putting back into force, albeit only partially, the Crop Intensification Decree that his predecessor Cirilo del Río had repealed, and ending the threat hanging over them of being evicted from the land by the owners. But the approval of the Yunteros Law was delayed for two months due to the parliamentary obstruction it encountered, so it arrived late for the cereal sowing and could only be applied for resowing or sowing on stubble, where it was not uneconomical to do so. When the agricultural year expired in July 1935, with Giménez Fernández already out of the ministry, the law was not renewed, so:

...the Extremaduran yunteros, who were landless peasants who only owned a yoke with a pair of oxen, but who were not ordinary labourers either, were massively expelled. The fortunate ones who could stay did so paying higher rents.

— Eduardo González Calleja and others (2015).

A second, even more ambitious project of Giménez Fernández was the Rural Leases Law, which sought to protect the rights of tenants, guaranteeing them the purchase of land after twelve years of exploitation at a reasonable price. But the Cortes, when approving the law on 15 March 1935, emptied it of its social content by establishing total freedom of contracting leases, repealing previous legislation on sublease, collective leases, evictions and rent revision. A third law, on increasing small-scale cultivation, which would have allowed the parcelling out of part of the large Extremaduran estates (the Extremaduran yunteros were allowed to occupy up to 25% of farms larger than 330 hectares for two years) did not prosper.

All these initiatives earned Giménez Fernández the nickname "disguised Marxist" or "white Bolshevik" from the owners' organisations that pressured, along with an important sector of his own party, the CEDA, for him to be left out of the government. A deputy told him: "Yes, you are lawyers for the right and you are at the service of the left, we all know it." Regarding the projected reform of the Agrarian Reform Law of 1932, Giménez Fernández had stated in the Cortes that he would try to focus it "so that through a formula, whatever it may be, land is taken where necessary, with full respect for the owner's right to receive rent; but also with strict submission of rural property, like all property in Spain, to the common good of all Spaniards." González Calleja and other historians comment: "The right of the chamber was already warned, so Giménez Fernández would never make such a reform."

Indeed, in the new cabinet of 6 May, Giménez Fernández was replaced by the member of the Agrarian Party and great landowner Nicasio Velayos Velayos, who immediately initiated a clearly "counter-reformist" policy. The first thing he did upon taking over the ministry was not to renew the Yunteros Law and then he presented the Law for the Reform of the Agrarian Reform, whose processing was done in less than a month (unlike what happened with Giménez Fernández's projects) and was approved on 1 August 1935. It meant the definitive freezing of the reform initiated in the first biennium. Among other things, the new law, which only formally left the 1932 one in force, suppressed expropriation without compensation (so the IRA was forced to pay for the lands confiscated from the nobility for their involvement in the Sanjurjada), and also gave the owners of expropriable farms the power to intervene in the official valuation of their properties, negotiating each case with the IRA, and could also appeal to the Courts (which in practice meant increasing the money the owners would receive as compensation). On the other hand, the IRA's funds for compensation were further limited, so only two thousand peasants could be settled per year, and the preparation of the Register of Expropriable Property was also stopped. However, the law introduced a novelty (thanks to an amendment proposed by the radical deputy José María Álvarez Mendizábal): the possibility of carrying out expropriations for reasons of "social utility", an article that would be widely used by the governments of the Popular Front in the first months of 1936.

The socialist organisations of labourers were completely dismantled, the mixed juries in the countryside ceased to function, and more than two thousand socialist and left republican councils, 20% of the total, were replaced by management commissions appointed by the government from among members of the Radical Republican Party and the CEDA. All this translated into a notable deterioration in the living conditions of the labourers, who had to accept lower wages if they wanted work.

=== Socio-labour "counter-reform" ===
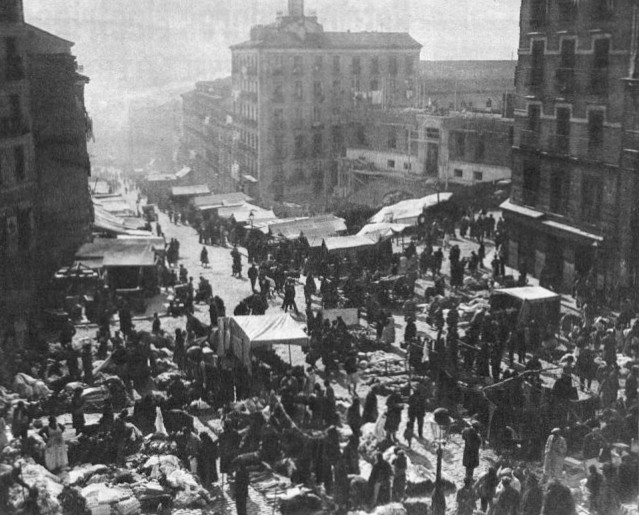
Photograph from Mundo Gráfico of El Rastro in Madrid (July 1935).

After the "October Revolution" and the harsh repression that followed, the plenary sessions of the Mixed Juries were suspended, although their definitive reform did not take place until July 1935. They were stripped of their universal character as the law established that they would be authorised "on an exceptional basis" "for certain industries" and for companies with more than five hundred workers, and only if there was a prior request from employers and workers. Despite everything, the reform did not satisfy the employers, who wanted the Mixed Juries to be only instances of conciliation and arbitration, but voluntary and without inspection and judicial powers and without the capacity to enter into the work bases that would be agreed between the interested parties. But the certain fact was that there were no elections to renew the members of the Mixed Juries, so practically throughout 1935 they ceased to function. The plenary sessions were not restored until as late as 22 January 1936, by the centrist government of Manuel Portela Valladares and when the general elections for February had already been called.

As for the workers, as Ángeles Barrio Alonso has pointed out, the dismantling of "the arbitration and negotiation structure created by Largo Caballero [Minister of Labour during the first biennium], including the Mixed Juries," pushed the situation of the unions to the limit "due to the persecution that the employers initiated against them." "Employers, especially in the countryside, began to roam freely," José Manuel Macarro Vera has stressed. The offensive against the unions was completed with the approval on 1 December 1934 of a Decree declaring "abusive strikes" illegal (those that were not strictly labour-related or did not have government authorisation). In January 1935, the Minister of Labour, the Cedist José Oriol Anguera de Sojo, presented a bill limiting the action of unions, although it would not finally be approved due to the rejection of the radicals, his government partners. In any case, his policy of not admitting negotiation in labour conflicts gave "wings to employers for layoffs." Indeed, thousands of workers lost their jobs on the pretext of having participated in the strikes of the "October Revolution" or simply for belonging to a union. Later, employers refused to reinstate them despite the numerous requests they received.

The consequences of the "socio-labour counter-reform" were the freezing of wages, and even their reduction in certain sectors, and the increase in the working day in others (for example, Anguera de Sojo re-established the 48-hour week in the metal sector of Madrid, when the previous year they had been reduced to 44 after a strike). If to this is added the increase in unemployment as a result of the economic depression (the "work crisis", as employers called it to justify layoffs), the difficult situation experienced by the working classes can be understood. By the end of 1935, the number of unemployed reached seven hundred and eighty thousand.

Regarding unemployment, the government tried to implement some measures of very limited scope, but they crashed against the restrictive budgetary policy adopted, making impossible, for example, the "Small Public Works Plan" that the Cedist Luis Lucia tried to implement to create employment.

=== Military policy of Gil Robles ===
After the "October Revolution", "the way was opened to a true regression in military policy," González Calleja and other historians have stated, also pointing out that "the [October] events represented a discredit of the Republic for the great neutral mass of soldiers, supporters of order, but eager not to get involved in politics," which "reactivated the right-wing manoeuvres to win over military wills" (it was then that the leader of the monarchist right José Calvo Sotelo said that the Army was "the vertebral column of the fatherland"). The Minister of War Diego Hidalgo was forced to resign due to pressure from the CEDA, and his portfolio was taken over by the Prime Minister Alejandro Lerroux himself, who immediately approved an order granting reinstatement to the Army to prominent monarchist generals. Among them was General Severiano Martínez Anido, former minister of the Dictatorship of Primo de Rivera.

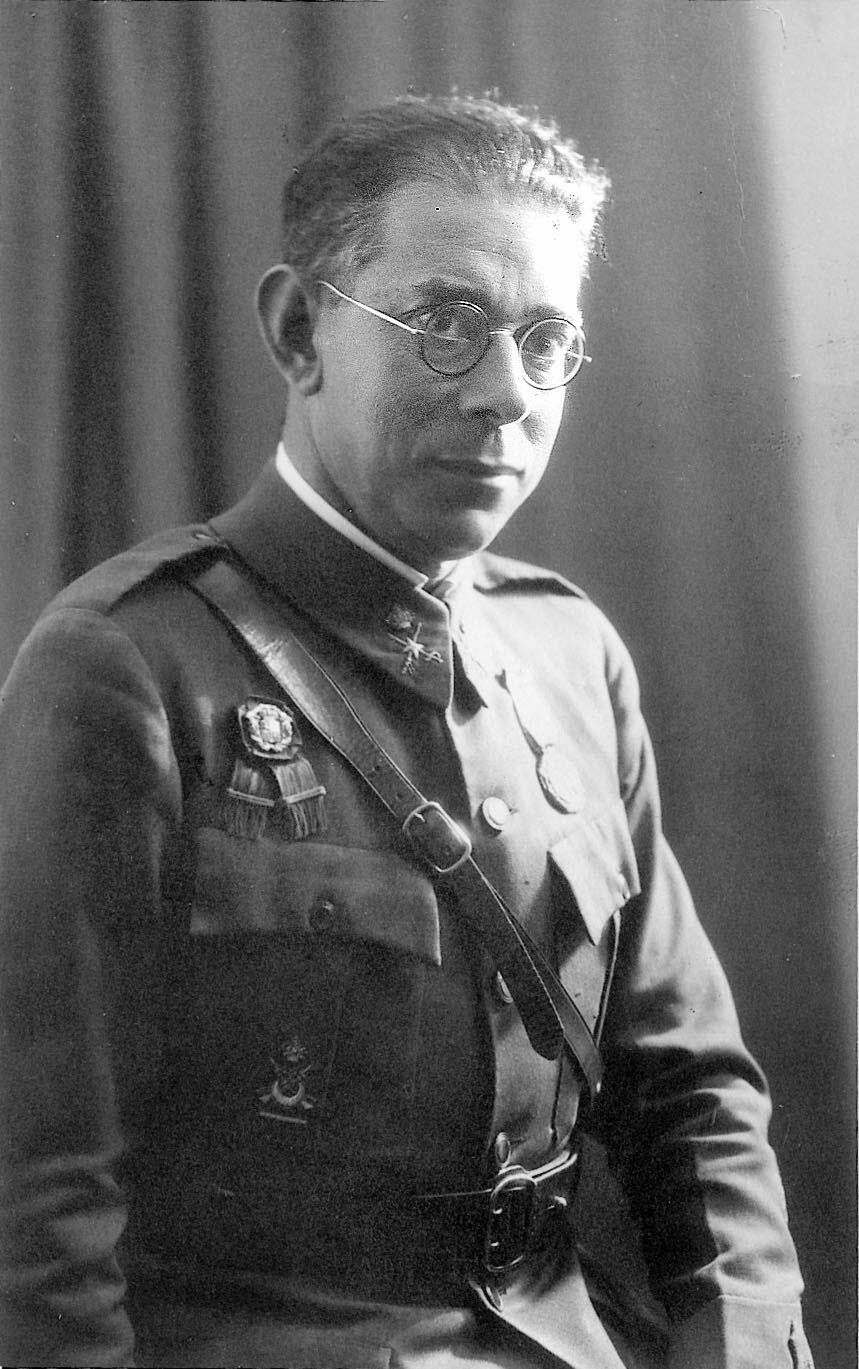
General Emilio Mola, who had been Director General of Security under the Monarchy, was appointed by Gil Robles, against the opinion of Alcalá-Zamora, as head of the Army of the Spanish Protectorate of Morocco.

The involutionary process culminated on 6 May 1935 with the accession of the leader of the CEDA José María Gil Robles to the Ministry of War. From that position, Gil Robles reinforced the role of soldiers of dubious loyalty to the Republic, despite the oath they had all taken. Thus, the most prominent occupied key positions in the military high command. General Fanjul, a known monarchist, founder of the semi-clandestine and anti-republican Spanish Military Union (UME), took over the Undersecretary of the Ministry; General Franco became Chief of the Central General Staff (despite the opposition of the President of the Republic, who commented: "the young generals are aspiring coup leaders"; and where the two officers who directed the UME, Lieutenant Colonel Valentín Galarza, involved in the "Sanjurjada", and Captain Bartolomé Barba Hernández, were stationed); General Emilio Mola took over the leadership of the Army of Morocco (also against the express opinion of Alcalá-Zamora); General Goded, the General Directorate of Aeronautics. All these generals would be the ones who would lead the July 1936 uprising that started the Spanish Civil War. In contrast, the soldiers most loyal to the Republic, such as General Riquelme, General Romerales or General Eduardo López Ochoa, were dismissed from their posts and officers considered "leftist" suffered professional reprisals. This was the case of General Miaja, who lost command of his Brigade, falsely accused of embezzlement, or Lieutenant Colonel Julio Mangada, who was dismissed and marginalised. According to González Calleja and other historians:

Gil Robles tried to politicise the Army in a markedly right-wing sense, carrying out a genuine purge of republican chiefs and officers that he himself acknowledged in his memoirs: "I ordered the availability of numerous chiefs and officers, I deprived many who did not deserve it of command and I purged, consequently, of clearly undesirable elements a large part of the Army." [...] With this he completely amended Azaña's project of a neutral and apolitical Army.

— Eduardo González Calleja and others (2015).

When he left office in December 1935, the Army's staff had grown by 25%.

Gil Robles also appointed many UME soldiers to relevant positions, such as Captain Luis López Varela who was in charge of the Internal Service of the Corps (a military secret service created by General Franco to combat "communist infiltration"). In a secret memorandum delivered to Mussolini by the leader of Spanish Renovation Antonio Goicoechea at their meeting in Rome on 11 October 1935, in whose drafting the UME had intervened, it was recognised that since the arrival of Gil Robles at the Ministry of War, "the placement of personnel from the organisation in commands, positions and destinations of importance and even capital for action" had been facilitated.

In the central administration it can be said that it is all under control. On the initiative of the Organisation, commands of real importance have been removed, replacing them with loyal personnel, and work continues on this task... The difficulty of changing the commands of the divisions, as a large part of the generals are disaffected to the organisation and affiliated to Freemasonry, since they were largely reinstated by the Republic, encountered great difficulties as there was no personnel willing to replace them. It has been necessary to cut to the quick through bills that lower the ages. In this way, eight division generals will go into the reserve and will be replaced by loyalists, since the unfreezing of those promoted for war merits facilitated their promotions. [...] The starting position has been strengthened more and more and today it can already be considered sufficiently firm to act if necessary. Not a step backwards in what has been conquered is the slogan... If politics forced a retreat, the organisation would detach itself from it and act on its own.

— Ángel Viñas (2019).

The memorandum made clear the commitment and willingness of the UME to end the Republic if the left returned to power, and about the leader of the CEDA it said:

Due to his populist tendency, it is certain that Gil Robles will not dare to lead a movement of this type from the Ministry of War, but the U.M.E. will do so the moment he leaves the Ministry due to the indicated political change.

— Ángel Viñas (2019).

General Franco himself acknowledged years later "that in this period the commands were granted that one day would be the pawns of the crusade of liberation and weapons were redistributed in a way that could respond to an emergency."

== End of the second biennium (September 1935 – February 1936) ==
=== Failure of constitutional reform and collapse of the radicals ===
One of the agreements pacted between the four parties that formed Lerroux's government of May 1935 (CEDA, Agrarian Party, Liberal Democratic Republican Party and Radical Republican Party) was to present a project for the "revision" of the Constitution (which was the most important point of the CEDA's "minimum programme" with which it presented itself to the elections). Although the republican centre-right and the CEDA disagreed on the scope of the constitutional reform, at the beginning of July 1935 they reached a preliminary agreement and Lerroux presented a draft bill in the Cortes proposing the change or suppression of 41 articles: the scope of autonomy of the "regions" was reduced with increased control by the central government; the way was opened for the suppression of divorce; the possibility of socialisation of private property was annulled; articles 26 and 27, which were the ones the Cedists insisted on most, were reformed, eliminating much of their "persecutory" content against the Catholic Church; and a Senate was established, as a second chamber of the Cortes. However, the debates dragged on forever because the draft bill did not fully satisfy any party.

On 1 September 1935, at a rally of the CEDA Youth (the JAP), Gil Robles declared that he aspired to the "total revision" of the Constitution and added that, if they did not approve it, "they are dead Cortes that must disappear," words that he always combined with declarations in which he submitted to legality, making a consciously confusing discourse.

The issue of the scope of the reform of the Constitution and that of the return to the Catalan Generalitat of some of the powers that had been suspended on the occasion of the "October Revolution" opened a crisis in the government. On 17 September, the Minister of the Navy, Antonio Royo Villanova, a fierce anti-Catalanist member of the Agrarian Party who demanded the repeal of the Statute of Autonomy of Catalonia, and his party colleague Nicasio Velayos Velayos resigned, and Lerroux dissolved his government.

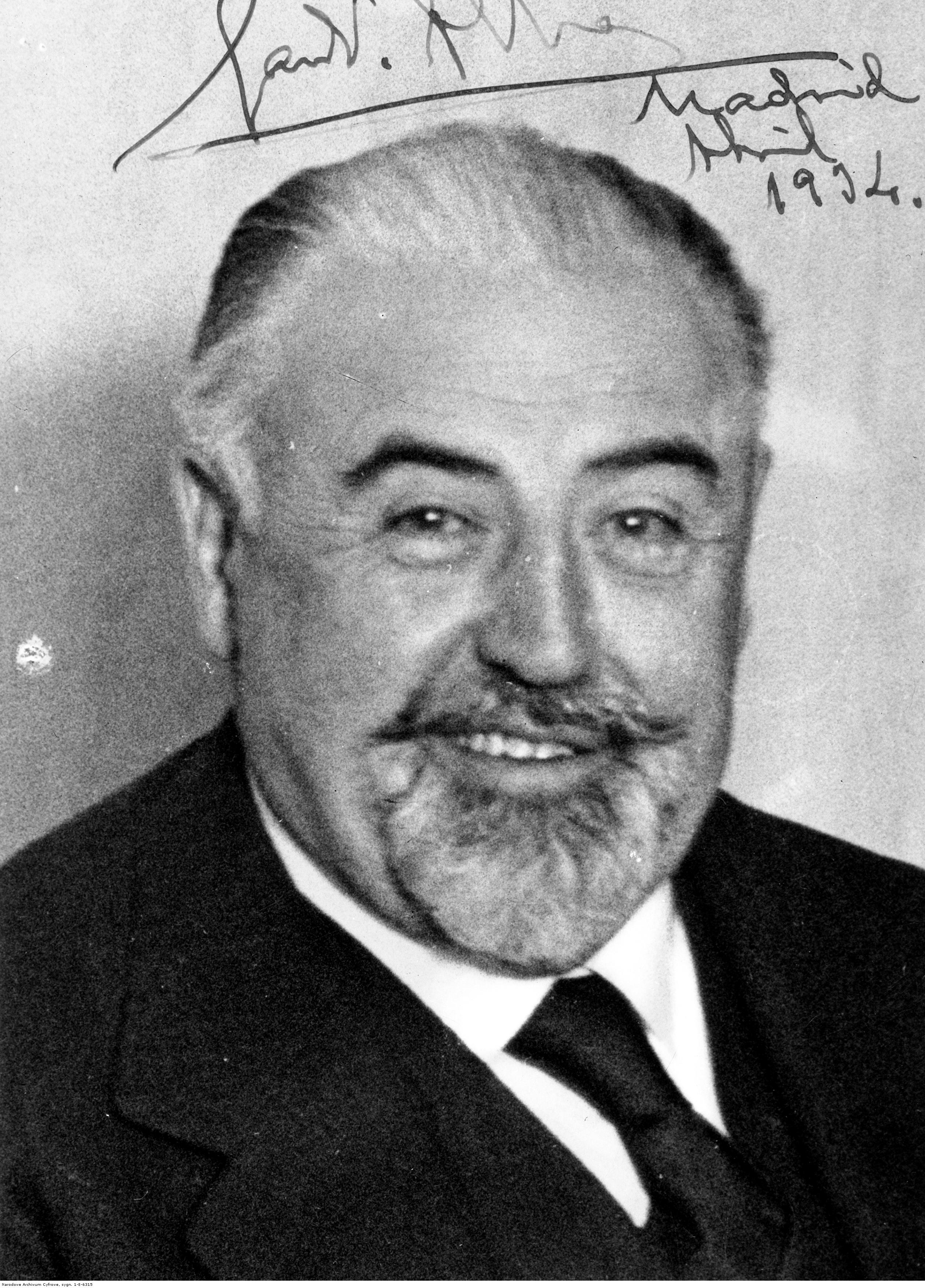
Santiago Alba Bonifaz, President of the Cortes during the second biennium. After the fall of Lerroux, Alcalá-Zamora offered him the presidency of the government, but Alba refused. The President of the Republic then appointed Joaquín Chapaprieta.

The President of the Republic Alcalá-Zamora took the opportunity to replace Lerroux with the Minister of Finance Joaquín Chapaprieta —an independent republican, a man of his confidence, who had been the promoter of a controversial Restrictions Law, approved on 1 August, which had meant a sharp cut in the personnel of the Administration by suppressing three ministries and twenty directorates general, all with the aim of wiping out the public deficit—, not before having offered the presidency of the government to the President of the Cortes Santiago Alba, who declined the invitation. As had happened on other occasions, Alcalá-Zamora accompanied the appointment with an explanatory note outlining the policy that the new government should follow. Chapaprieta maintained the radical-cedist alliance with Lerroux and Gil Robles in the government (the former held the State portfolio and the latter remained at the head of War), and included a minister from the Lliga Catalana, to broaden the parliamentary base of the government (which happened for the first time in the history of the Republic; it was Pere Rahola, Minister of the Navy). But this cabinet, formed on 25 September (with three fewer portfolios with the aim of "restricting" public spending: for this reason the CEDA went from five to three ministers), was affected by the outbreak of the Straperlo scandal, which caused the departure of Lerroux from the government on 29 October and of the rest of the radical ministers, and later by the Nombela affair which constituted the final blow for the Radical Republican Party, from which it would not recover.

In the fact that the Straperlo scandal —"in reality, it was only about shady deals of little significance," according to Nigel Townson— became the tomb of Lerroux and his party, a prominent role was played by the President of the Republic Niceto Alcalá Zamora himself —although there are historians who also attribute a relevant role to Manuel Azaña and Indalecio Prieto—. When Alcalá Zamora received the letter from the promoter of the Straperlo (a fraudulent electric roulette game, very different from the classic casino roulette) in which he stated that he had paid significant amounts of money to various radical politicians, among them Lerroux's adopted son, Aurelio Lerroux, to facilitate its legalisation without having achieved that objective, he saw the opportunity to occupy the republican political space of the centre that the fall of the radicals would leave vacant and presented the matter to the Council of Ministers. Gil Robles, who also wanted to finish off Lerroux, was the one who most insisted that the matter be brought to the Cortes (and be made known to public opinion through a press release). In Parliament, the deputies issued a vote of condemnation against those involved and Lerroux was forced to resign on 29 October. "He was, now hopelessly, politically finished, and also his party, which, having lost its cohesive agent, quickly disintegrated," states Gabriele Ranzato. "In reality, the scandals in question were, as far as the amount of money destined for bribery was concerned, very small" —"nothing to do with the Stavisky affair, which occurred in France shortly before"—, but they resulted in the disappearance of the Radical Republican Party, which among the major parties "was the most sincere and coherent defender" of the democratic system, adds Ranzato.

Payne goes further than Ranzato by attributing the maximum responsibility for Lerroux's fall to the President of the Republic:

Alcalá-Zamora sought the destruction of Lerroux, one of his two main rivals, and equally desired the elimination of the Radical Party. This truth is ironic and contradictory, since one of the president's basic objectives was to "centre the Republic" as a liberal democracy. But his vanity and ambition prevented him from accepting another politician as head of that republican centre, just as he did not accept a Catholic party like the CEDA that was not under his influence and that did not understand the Republic in his own terms. This envy and his resentment proved fatal for the fate of the Republic.

— Stanley G. Payne (2020).

=== Final offensive of the CEDA and attempted coup d'état ===
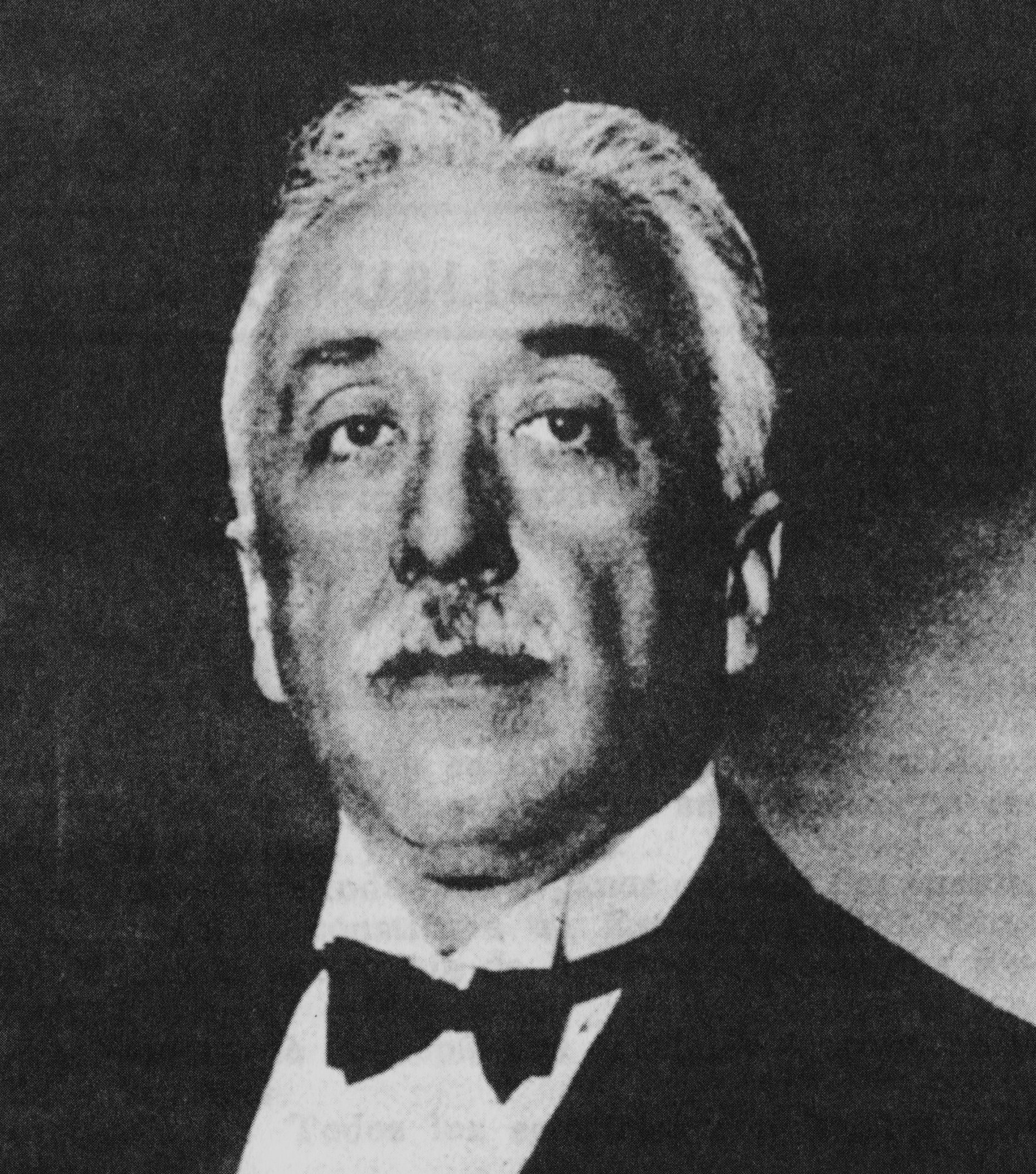
Niceto Alcalá-Zamora.

The collapse of the radicals as a result of the Straperlo scandal and the "Nombela affair" (this matter was discussed in the Cortes on the evening of 7 December and during the session there were moments of tension that showed the cracking of the Radical Party, although finally Lerroux, who did not attend the debate, was exonerated), convinced Gil Robles that the time had come to reach power and he withdrew support from the government of Joaquín Chapaprieta, citing his disagreement with the budget and tax reform project that the president had presented and which had indeed raised strong opposition in the Cortes (Gil Robles had already accused the Restrictions Law of 1 August 1935 promoted by Chapaprieta of having increased the unpopularity of the CEDA among the middle classes, because thousands of civil servants had been dismissed; now Chapaprieta, nicknamed Chapa-y-aprieta (roughly "Sheet-and-tighten"), proposed an increase in taxes to achieve budgetary equilibrium in 1936, which some deputies of the Radical Party and the CEDA described as "Marxist" or "confiscatory"). On 8 December, Chapaprieta resigned and the President of the Republic Alcalá-Zamora began the mandatory round of consultations to appoint a new prime minister. On 9 December 1935, the day on which four years of the Constitution of 1931 were completed (so from that moment on, the 2/3 majority of deputies was not necessary to modify the Constitution, but an absolute majority was sufficient), Gil Robles demanded the presidency of the government. "With the radicals —integrated into the other important governing party— divided, weakened and discredited, Gil Robles logically expected to become prime minister in a coalition led by the CEDA," Payne has pointed out. Gil Robles "hoped finally to reap the fruit of two hard years of harassment and overthrow of republican institutions, culminating his strategy of taking power through legality," González Calleja and other historians have specified.

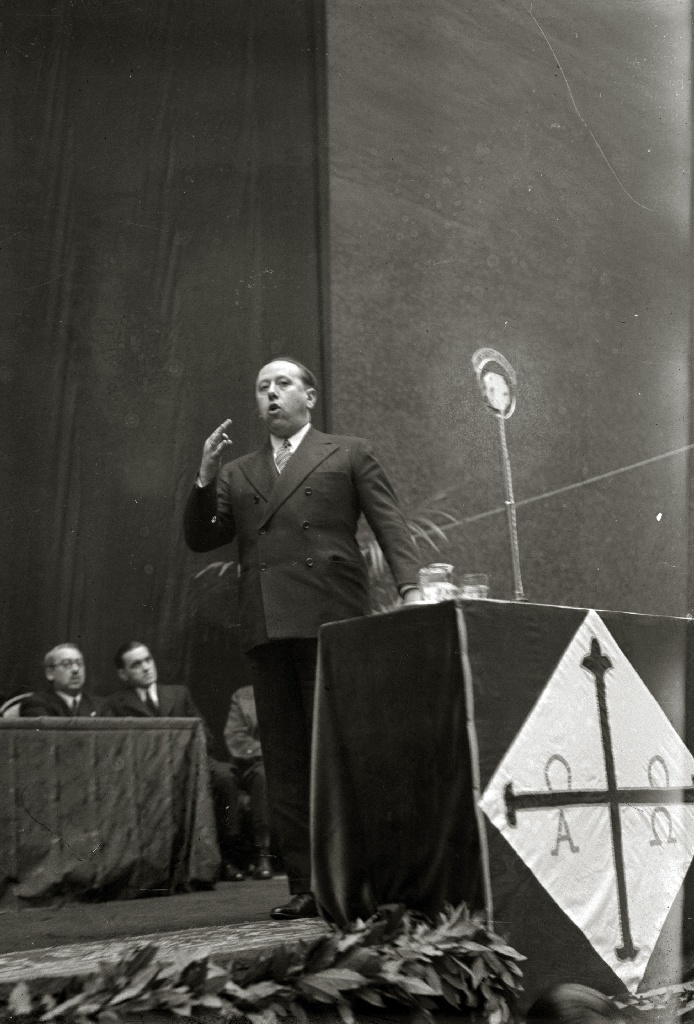
José María Gil Robles at a CEDA rally held at the Urumea fronton in San Sebastián on 25 November 1935.

But the President of the Republic Alcalá Zamora refused to give power to an "accidentalist" force that had not proclaimed its loyalty to the Republic. "He feared, with more or less foundation, that Gil-Robles sought to accede to the Government to transform the republican democratic system of 1931 into a conservative, Catholic, corporatist and authoritarian State," Ángel Luis López Villaverde has stated. "The president of the Republic was of the opinion that entrusting the government to Gil Robles was a danger to democracy," Gabriele Ranzato also notes. González Calleja and other historians consider that:

...the president's fear of handing over power to a minority CEDA Government was justified by the eventuality that, in the absence of any other alternative political formula, he would have to give the decree of dissolution of the Chamber to the Catholics, and that from the position of strength that control of the government apparatus gave, elections of a plebiscitary tone would be held that would act as a prelude to a constitutional reform that would empty the Republic of democratic content, or something worse, would be the prelude to a monarchical restoration. (Note: Something that had just happened in Greece with the return to the throne of George II.)

— Eduardo González Calleja and others (2015).

Alcalá Zamora himself explained in his Memoirs his decision not to give power to Gil Robles:

He [Gil Robles] had been elected in 1933 among the list of enemies of the Republic, allied with monarchists, and making his propaganda on the condemnation of 12 and 14 April 1931. Afterwards he had avoided making explicit declarations of full adherence to the [republican] regime, limiting himself to saying that this problem was not opportune to raise. [...] It was necessary, therefore, for the presidency [of the government] that he be re-elected without monarchical alliance and with unequivocal republican declarations, without any reservation. It was also advisable that he impose himself on the fascist nucleus of his party, the noisiest and the most pampered by him until then.

— Niceto Alcalá Zamora (1937).

In the tense conversation that Alcalá Zamora and Gil Robles had in the Palacio Nacional on the afternoon of 11 December, the leader of the CEDA warned the President of the Republic: "With the failure of my policy, only violent solutions can be attempted. Whether the right or the left triumphs at the polls, unfortunately, no other way out will remain than civil war." Gil Robles left the meeting convinced that Alcalá Zamora had decided to dissolve the Cortes and call new elections. In his memoirs written thirty years later, Gil Robles wrote: "I begged Mr. Alcalá-Zamora not to take such a step. The moment chosen for the dissolution, I told him, could not have been more inopportune. The Cortes were still capable of completing a fruitful work, after which the electoral consultation could be carried out without risks." Payne agrees with the assessment Gil Robles made:

On the one hand, a premature dissolution meant an undeserved opportunity for the left to reconstitute its power, while, on the other, it would give more strength to the argument of the extreme right that a normal parliamentary government could not function in Spain.

— Stanley G. Payne (2020).

When Gil Robles returned to the Ministry of War, General Fanjul, its undersecretary, made him the following offer: "I will go out this very night with the troops of the Madrid garrison. I know that Varela thinks like me, and others will surely second us." But Gil Robles, instead of arresting and dismissing him for his coup-mongering proposal, replied, as he wrote many years later when Gil Robles "wanted to present himself as a Christian democrat", that "my democratic convictions and my invincible repugnance to put the armed forces at the service of a political faction" prevented him from attempting "any pronunciamiento in my favour." "However, if the Army, grouped around its natural commanders, thinks that it should temporarily occupy power in order to save the spirit of the Constitution and avoid a gigantic fraud of a revolutionary nature, I will not constitute the slightest obstacle." In another version given by Gil Robles himself, he stated that he had replied to General Fanjul: "I will facilitate the process [of the eventual intervention of the Army] by decreeing the state of war and will transmit the orders from here. You have the necessary time to deliberate." In fact, a meeting of military officers was immediately convened, attended by Generals Fanjul, Goded, Varela, Franco, and Ángel Rodríguez del Barrio, during which Lieutenant Colonel Valentín Galarza conveyed a message to them from the Alfonsine monarchist leader José Calvo Sotelo inciting them to carry out a coup d'état that would include the kidnapping of the President of the Republic, and if they did not, "history would one day have to demand implacable responsibilities from them." They debated whether Gil Robles should be supported by force, but in the end the opinion of General Franco, Chief of Staff, prevailed not to carry it out given its slim chances of success due to the loyalty to the President of the Republic of many commanders, among them Generals Nicolás Molero and Gonzalo Queipo de Llano. Contrary to what other historians, such as González Calleja, affirm, Payne considers that "the Cedist leader did not propose a coup d'état, but a kind of 'legalitarian pronunciamiento'."

Finally, on 12 December, Gil Robles left the Ministry of War with "infinite bitterness", which Calvo Sotelo described as a "betrayal of the generals" —in fact, Calvo Sotelo made one last attempt at the end of December during a meal with General Franco at the home of the Marchioness of Argüelles—. General Franco, very emotional, bid farewell to Gil Robles with these words:

...the army had never felt so well directed. Honour, discipline, all the basic concepts of the army have been re-established and have been embodied by you. I can do nothing else at this moment when emotion prevents me from speaking, but to signify to what extent rectitude has been the sole norm of the Minister of War.

On 16 December, Gil Robles made public a "Manifesto to public opinion" in which he pointed out that "the crisis is nothing more than the last episode of the Revolution's struggle against the current Cortes", complaining next that the President of the Republic did not grant him the direction of the country "on the pretext of weakness of republican fervour, despite the fact that none of its elements [of the CEDA] figured in the front ranks of the parties of the Monarchy." He ended by saying:

We appeal to public opinion to ask it that, with the sanction of its votes, it give our party the strength it needs to sweep away all obstacles and dominate the revolution that, defeated in the street, has managed to entrench itself in our institutional framework.

— Gil Robles (1935).

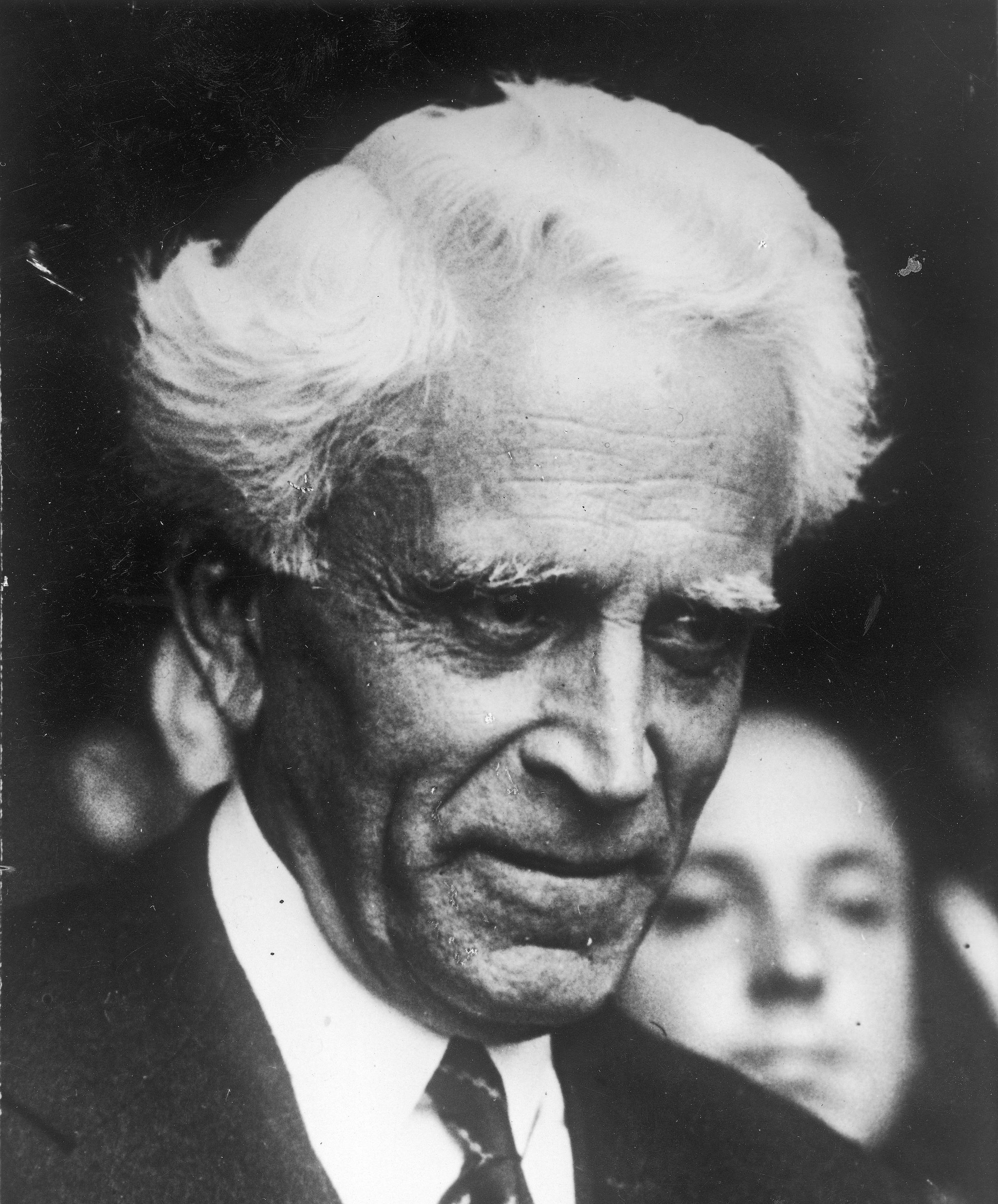
Manuel Portela Valladares in 1935. On 14 December he was appointed Prime Minister by President Niceto Alcalá-Zamora despite not being a deputy and lacking significant parliamentary support.

After proposing it to the conservative republican Miguel Maura and the agrarian José Martínez de Velasco, who declined the offer, the President of the Republic entrusted the formation of a government to an independent of his confidence who was not even a deputy and who lacked significant parliamentary support, Manuel Portela Valladares, who formed on 15 December a centre-right republican cabinet, in which the CEDA refused to participate (with two military men at the head of War and the Navy, General Nicolás Molero and Vice Admiral Francisco Javier de Salas González, respectively). Miguel Maura, who was present at the conversation between Alcalá-Zamora and Portela Valladares to appoint him the new head of the executive, stated that the new government had been built from "the old politics of the worst kind."

For the government to subsist, Alcalá-Zamora took advantage of the presidential prerogative to close the Cortes for thirty days, although he ran into the obstacle that the budgets would have to be extended for three months and for that the Cortes should meet. The parliamentary leaders, led by Gil Robles, protested the president's manoeuvres and the CEDA leader announced on 28 December that his political formation would not go in any joint candidacy with those who "cooperate from the Government in Mr. Portela's plans." So a crisis soon broke out within the government itself and Portela Valladares communicated to the President of the Republic that his cabinet had ceased to exist. Immediately, Alcalá Zamora authorised him to form a new government, which, according to Payne, "was an even more artificial sham than its predecessor, without the slightest pretence of being a representative parliamentary coalition. It consisted exclusively of personal friends and cronies of the president and the prime minister." It had only the support of the Progressive Republican Party of President Alcalá-Zamora, and the Liberal Democratic Republican Party of Melquiades Álvarez. Gil Robles branded it in his Memoirs as a "simple camarilla of office secretaries" and its president as a "mandatary of the Masonic lodges". Of all the ministers, six were not deputies, nor was Portela Valladares.

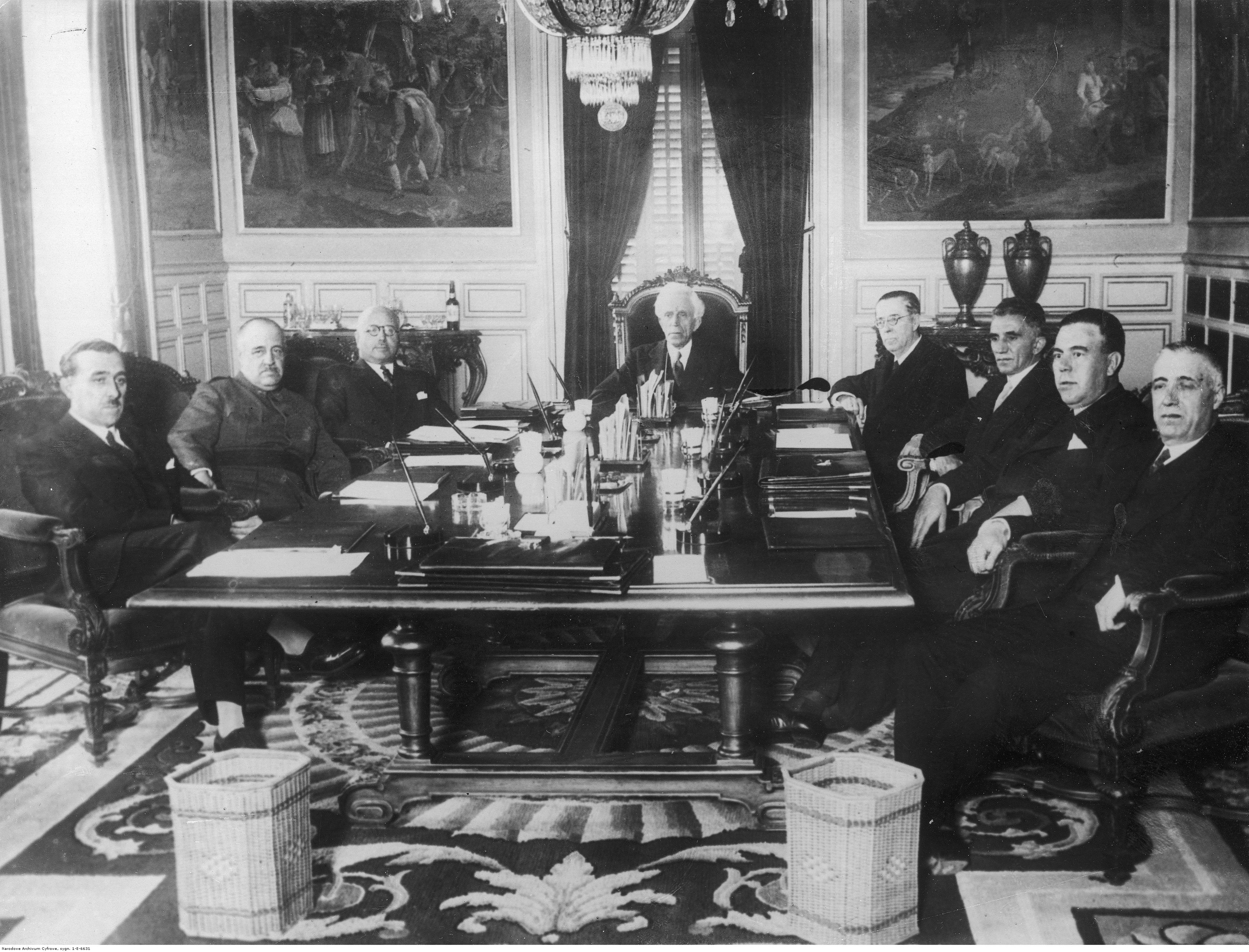
Second Government of Manuel Portela Valladares (at the head of the table), who received the task from Alcalá-Zamora to organise a centre republican party from power. On the left, dressed in uniform, the Minister of War, General Nicolás Molero.

Finally, Alcalá Zamora could no longer prolong the situation of interim (the right-wing deputies demanded on 2 January the meeting of the Permanent Deputation to debate a "petition for criminal responsibility" against the head of the Government and his ministers, for having extended the budget by decree and prolonged the suspension of the sessions of the Cortes until the end of January, which they described as "a true coup d'état") and dissolved Parliament on 7 January (the same day the Permanent Deputation was to meet). The elections would be held on 16 February 1936, the first round, and 1 March, the second.

At the same time, Alcalá Zamora commissioned Portela to form a centre republican party to stand in the elections with the aim of winning them and thus consolidating republican democracy. "The president [of the Republic] planned to give Portela several months to manipulate the creation of his new political group, but the deputies of the opposition had forced his hand... The president of the Council would have a minimum amount of time," Payne states. To fulfil the task given to him by Alcalá-Zamora to form a new party from power, Portela:

...manipulated the provincial governments in a frenetic way; in two months he appointed eighty-eight civil governors, proportionally a record... But all this served him little. Most of the "political space" was already occupied and public opinion was much more mobilised and vigilant, so the caciquil manoeuvres of yesteryear were very difficult.

— Stanley G. Payne (2020).

In fact, only in nine constituencies, out of the thirty-six in which Portela's Democratic Centre Party presented candidates, did it form its own lists. In the rest, it stood in coalition with the right.

The action of the President of the Republic Alcalá Zamora has been the subject of intense historiographical debate. According to Gabriele Ranzato, by refusing to appoint Gil Robles as Prime Minister, "Alcalá Zamora had the best intentions" as his aim was "to keep Spain within the democratic system of Western European countries" —coinciding with Ángel Luis López Villaverde—.

But the methods with which he tried to achieve that objective were inadequate and often counterproductive... He intrigued to bring about the downfall of Lerroux, without considering that the disappearance from the scene of the old republican patriarch would cause events to precipitate to the point of not allowing him to create in time a political force capable of forming a new point of attraction for radical votes.

— Gabriele Ranzato (2014).

Payne agrees with Ranzato on Alcalá Zamora's contribution to the "destruction of the main existing centre group —Lerroux and the radicals— in order to rebuild it into a new grouping indirectly subordinate to his own leadership. A pure egocentric delusion that in no way corresponded to political reality...". But Payne totally disagrees with Ranzato in his assessment of Alcalá Zamora's refusal to give power to the CEDA, as he considers that decision was "the height of irresponsibility" and "the greatest of his mistakes." "Alcalá Zamora refused to follow the logic of parliamentary democracy and allow the most voted party to form a government," although Payne recognises that "that might have meant the end of republican democracy" by establishing "a semi-corporate and more authoritarian system." This fact, Payne continues, "might have entailed resistance and some bloodshed, but to a much lesser degree than the horrors produced by the Civil War and the beginnings of the Franco regime." According to Payne, the ultimate reason for Alcalá Zamora's actions, who saw himself "as the last guarantor of the Liberal Republic", was that "he was a product of the 19th century, of an elitist and oligarchic political culture... Therefore he had difficulties overcoming his deep personalism and his egocentric obsession with his personal status and leadership." Furthermore, Alcalá Zamora refused to propose the leader of the CEDA as head of government because of the "great animosity he felt towards Gil Robles", whom in his memoirs Alcalá Zamora described as "epileptic" and "frenetic caudillo". Payne concludes that "it was the will and interference of a president that annulled Parliament, which still had two years of life and offered a viable majority."

Luis Palacios Bañuelos has also pointed out "the personal incompatibility that existed between Alcalá-Zamora and Gil Robles." And he provides the testimony of the former Cedist minister Manuel Giménez Fernández who wrote:

I became convinced that the personal incompatibility of Gil Robles with His Excellency [Alcalá-Zamora] had reached irreconcilable extremes, since the disparity of characters had been aggravated by many interested in there being no solution, namely: the monarchists; the aristocratoids; the conservatives of the CEDA, who in an anti-presidential reaction believe they see the triumph of their tendency; the leading youth of the JAP, who confuse effective dignity with untimely gallantry.

— Manuel Giménez Fernández.

=== Integration of the republican and socialist left around Manuel Azaña ===
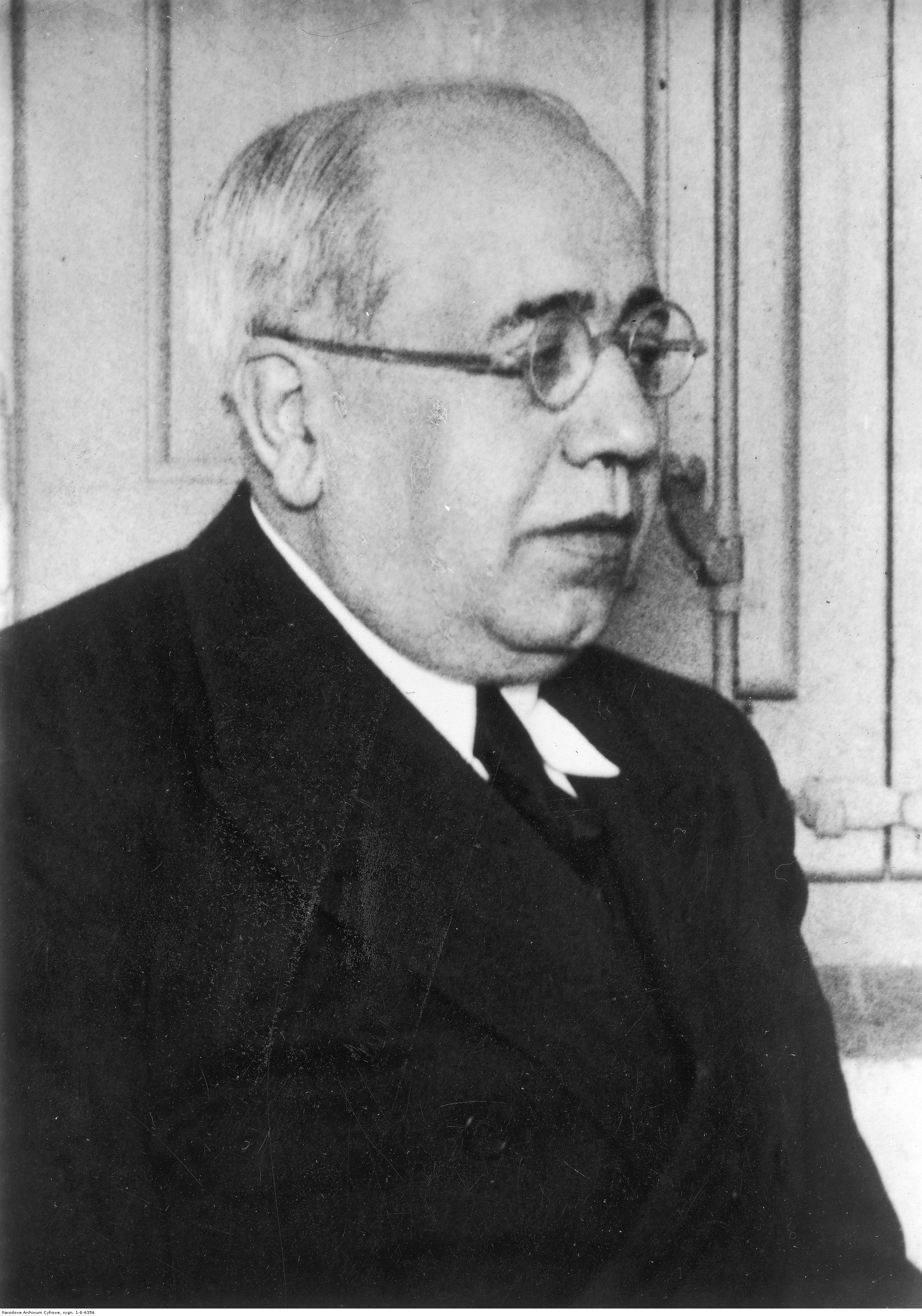
Manuel Azaña was the great driving force behind the union of the left that would culminate in the formation of the Popular Front that would win the general elections of February 1936.

The proposal to return to the republican-socialist alliance of the first biennium came from the initiative of the left republicans, and more specifically from their leader Manuel Azaña, who after his unjust detention for the October events had become a "political martyr" and a symbol for the left. After the entry into the government in May 1935 of more CEDA ministers (with their leader Gil Robles at the helm), Azaña toured the country giving three massive rallies: at the Mestalla Stadium (Valencia) on 26 May; at Barakaldo (Biscay) on 14 July; and at Comillas (Madrid) on 20 October, with the aim of achieving a "republican intelligence" that would restore the regime's 1931 values.

In April 1935, Azaña had reached a pact of "Republican Conjunction" between his own party (now called Republican Left after merging Republican Action the previous year with the "independent" Radical-Socialist Party of Marcelino Domingo and the ORGA of Santiago Casares Quiroga) and the Republican Union of Diego Martínez Barrio, which had split in 1934 from Lerroux's Radical Republican Party, and the National Republican Party of Felipe Sánchez Román. In mid-November 1935, Azaña offered the PSOE, which had emerged from the failed "October Revolution" notably divided, the formation of an electoral coalition based on the pact of the forces of the republican left.

While the "centrist" socialist sector headed by Indalecio Prieto, exiled in France, defended the agreement, the "leftist" sector headed by Francisco Largo Caballero, still in prison, was reticent to it and to reinforce the "workers'" part of the coalition he imposed the inclusion of the PCE in it, which led to the departure of Sánchez Román's party from the Republican Conjunction. The PCE, for its part, had changed its position regarding the socialists (whom it had hitherto considered "enemies" of the revolution and branded "social-fascists") after the 7th Congress of the Third International held in Moscow in the summer of 1935, in which Stalin had launched the new slogan of forming "anti-fascist fronts". The signing of the pact of the electoral coalition between the left republicans and the socialists took place on 15 January 1936. When the PSOE affixed its signature, it did so also in the name of the PCE and other workers' organisations (the Syndicalist Party of Ángel Pestaña and the POUM).

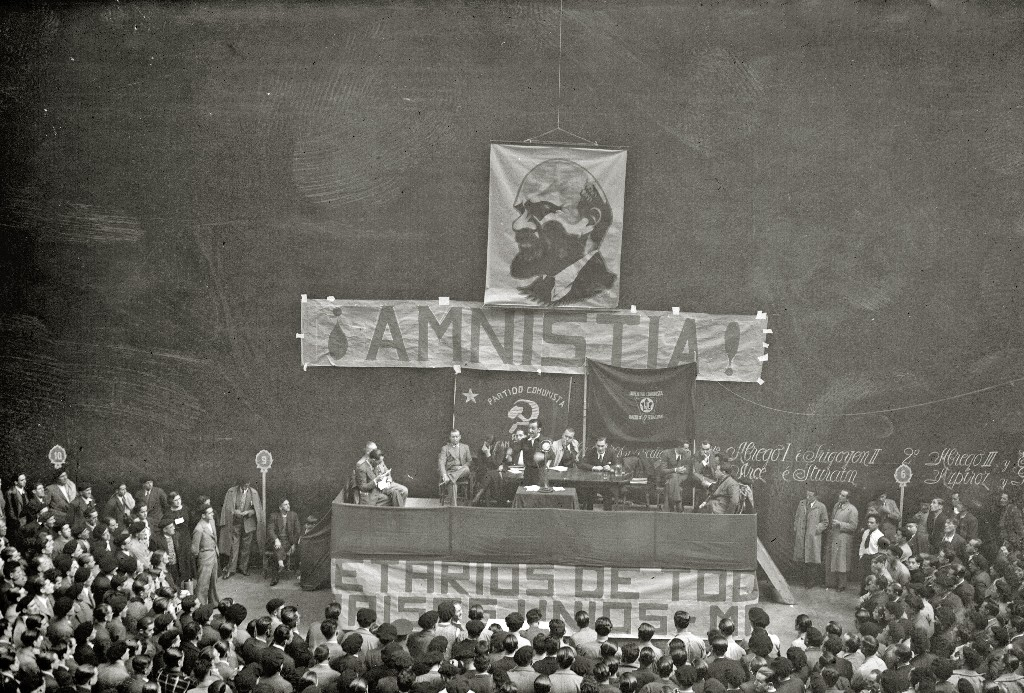
Rally of the Communist Party of Spain held in Gipuzkoa presided over by a large banner demanding amnesty for those imprisoned for the "Revolution of October 1934" and by a large portrait of Lenin.

The moderate programme of the coalition, which began to be called "Popular Front", although that term did not appear in the document signed on 15 January and was a name that Azaña never accepted, was that of the left republicans (and only the aspirations of the "workers'" forces with which the left republicans disagreed were mentioned). The programme included, firstly, amnesty for "political and social" crimes (the release of all those detained for the "October Revolution"), the continuity of the reformist legislation of the first biennium and the resumption of the autonomy processes of the "regions", which entailed the reform of the Court of Constitutional Guarantees. The government would be formed exclusively by left republicans and the socialists would give it their support from parliament. Thus, the 1936 alliance was circumstantial, limited to the elections, and therefore very different from that of 1931.

Various historians have highlighted that the agreement between the left republicans and the socialists was not conceived as a government pact, that is, in Spain, unlike in France, a true Popular Front was not constituted. This was understood by the "Caballeristas", who considered that "the [republican-socialist] entente would be purely electoral, conditioned by the demand for amnesty and, therefore, not subject to a subsequent parliamentary commitment," Álvarez Tardío and Villa García have pointed out. The latter fully agree with José Manuel Macarro Vera:

The socialist left cared little for the electoral programme that Prieto signed with the republicans... because, by demanding that the coalition be endorsed by the UGT, it imposed a condition: they would go to the elections together, but without a government pact between the republicans and the socialists, because, as that left never tired of repeating, the working class was not satisfied with recovering the conquests achieved in 1931–1933, but wanted to go much further. In principle, let the republicans govern, and when they were exhausted, power would fall into the hands of the left like ripe fruit.

— José Manuel Macarro Vera (2012).

== Elections of February 1936 ==
Faced with the electoral coalition of the left, finally known by the name "Popular Front" (which in Catalonia also included Republican Left of Catalonia and other Catalan nationalist parties and adopted the name "Front d'Esquerres"; against which the right formed a "Front Català d'Ordre" made up of the CEDA, the Lliga, the radicals and the Traditionalists), the right could not oppose as in 1933 a homogeneous front, because the CEDA, in its attempt to gain power and avoid the triumph of the left, allied in some constituencies with the anti-republican forces (Alfonsine monarchists, Carlists) and in others with the republican centre-right (radicals, democrat-liberals, progressive republicans), making it impossible to present a common programme. What Gil Robles aimed to form was an "Anti-Revolutionary National Front" or a "Counter-Revolution Front", based more on "anti-" slogans than on a concrete government programme, to add as many political forces as possible and prevent the triumph of the left ("Against the revolution and its accomplices", was one of his slogans; "For God and for Spain!" was another; and he presented the campaign as a battle between "Catholic Spain... and the appalling, barbaric, atrocious revolution"). The 1933 Union of the Right was not, therefore, reissued, as the monarchists demanded, so the Alfonsines of Spanish Renovation stood in several constituencies alone under the name National Bloc, whose leader was José Calvo Sotelo. A third "centrist" option also stood in the elections, headed by Prime Minister Portela Valladares and sponsored by the man who had appointed him, the President of the Republic Niceto Alcalá-Zamora, who sought to consolidate a republican centre that would overcome the bipolarisation arising from the October Revolution.

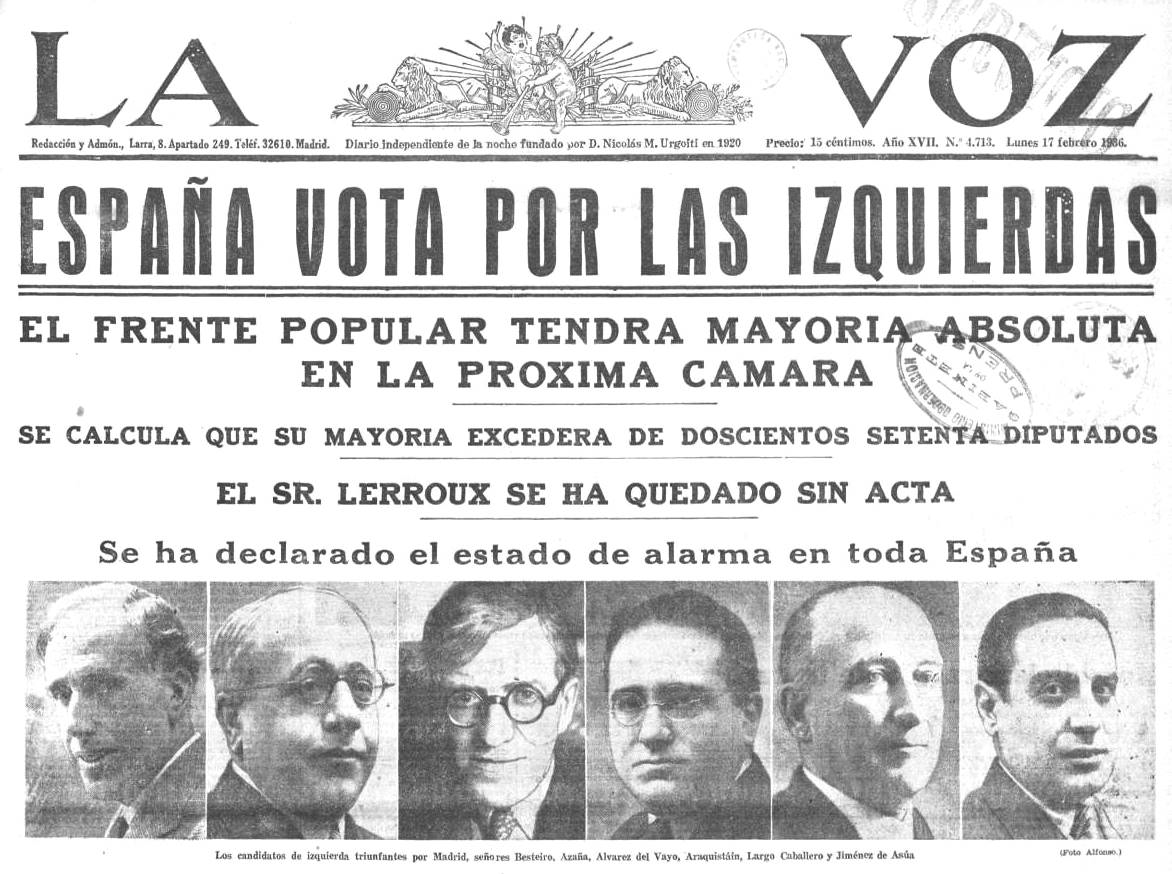
Cover of the daily La Voz of Monday 17 February announcing the victory of the Popular Front by absolute majority. Appearing are photographs of the candidates who were elected on the Madrid list (from left to right): Julián Besteiro, Manuel Azaña, Julio Álvarez del Vayo, Luis Araquistain, Francisco Largo Caballero and Luis Jiménez de Asúa. The newspaper also highlights on the front page that former Prime Minister Alejandro Lerroux was not elected. It also announces that the government of Manuel Portela Valladares has declared a state of alarm throughout Spain.

The elections registered the highest participation of the three general elections that took place during the Second Republic (72.9%), which was attributed to the workers' vote that did not follow the usual abstentionist slogans of the anarchists. According to the study carried out by the historian Javier Tusell on the elections, the result was a very balanced distribution of votes with a slight advantage for the left (47.1%) over the right (45.6%), while the centre was limited to 5.3%, but as the electoral system favoured the winners, this translated into a comfortable majority for the "Popular Front" coalition. In addition to the great novelty of the electoral disappearance of the Radical Party (which went from one hundred and four deputies in 1933 to only five in 1936; Lerroux did not retain his seat), the results showed the consolidation of three major political forces: the left republicans (with one hundred and twenty-five deputies: eighty-seven from Republican Left and thirty-eight from Republican Union), plus the CEDA on its right (went from one hundred and fifteen deputies in 1933 to eighty-eight, while the Agrarian Party went from thirty-six to eleven); and the PSOE on its left (from fifty-eight deputies to ninety-nine). The PCE entered parliament with seventeen deputies, also the Syndicalist Party and the POUM, with one deputy each. It was again a very fragmented parliament in which there were thirty-three parties represented, of which only eleven exceeded ten deputies.

In total, the "Popular Front" had 263 deputies, the right had 156 and the centre-right parties added up to 54 deputies. "The left returned to power but neither the Government nor the programme were radical. In Azaña's Executive, made up of lawyers and university professors, above all, there were only republicans."

== Bibliography ==
- Álvarez Tardío, Manuel (2012). "La CEDA: ¿Amenaza u oportunidad?". In Manuel Álvarez Tardío; Fernando del Rey Reguillo (eds.). El laberinto republicano. La democracia española y sus enemigos (1931-1936) [The Republican Labyrinth: Spanish Democracy and Its Enemies (1931–1936)] (PDF). Barcelona: RBA. pp. 100–134. ISBN 978-84-9006-357-6.
- Álvarez Tardío, Manuel; Villa García, Roberto (2017). 1936. Fraude y violencia en las elecciones del Frente Popular [1936. Fraud and violence in the Popular Front elections] (PDF). Barcelona: Espasa. ISBN 978-84-670-4946-6.
- Barrio Alonso, Ángeles (2004). La modernización de España (1917-1939). Política y sociedad [The Modernization of Spain (1917–1939). Politics and Society]. Col. Historia de España 3er. milenio, directed by Elena Hernández Sandoica, No. 30. Madrid: Síntesis. ISBN 84-9756-223-2.
- Calero, Antonio Mª (1985). "Octubre visto por la derecha". In Gabriel Jackson; others (eds.). Octubre 1934. Cincuenta años para la reflexión [October 1934. Fifty years for reflection]. Madrid: Siglo XXI. ISBN 84-323-0515-4.
- Casanova, Julián (2007). República y Guerra Civil. Vol. 8 de la Historia de España, dirigido por Josep Fontana y Ramón Villares [The Republic and the Civil War. Vol. 8 of the History of Spain, edited by Josep Fontana and Ramón Villares]. Barcelona: Crítica/Marcial Pons. ISBN 978-84-8432-878-0.
- Fusi Aizpurúa, Juan Pablo (1985). "Nacionalismo y revolución: Octubre de 1934 en el País Vasco". In Gabriel Jackson; others (eds.). Octubre 1934. Cincuenta años para la reflexión [October 1934. Fifty years for reflection]. Madrid: Siglo XXI. ISBN 84-323-0515-4.
- Gil Pecharromán, Julio (1997). La Segunda República. Esperanzas y frustraciones [The Second Republic: Hopes and Frustrations]. Madrid: Historia 16. ISBN 84-7679-319-7.
- González Calleja, Eduardo (2011). Contrarrevolucionarios. Radicalización violenta de las derechas durante la Segunda República. Madrid: Alianza Editorial. ISBN 978-84-206-6455-2.
- González Calleja, Eduardo; Cobo Romero, Francisco; Martínez Rus, Ana; Sánchez Pérez, Francisco (2015). La Segunda República Española [The Second Spanish Republic]. Barcelona: Pasado & Presente. ISBN 978-84-943139-7-4.
- Jackson, Gabriel (1976) [1965]. La República Española y la Guerra Civil, 1931-1939 [The Spanish Republic and the Civil War, 1931-1939] (2nd ed.). Barcelona: Crítica. ISBN 84-7423-006-3.
- Juliá, Santos (1999). Un siglo de España. Política y sociedad [A Century of Spain: Politics and Society]. Madrid: Marcial Pons. ISBN 84-9537903-1.
- — (1997). Los socialistas en la política española, 1879-1982 [Socialists in Spanish Politics, 1879–1982]. Madrid: Taurus. ISBN 84-306-0010-8.
- — (1990). Manuel Azaña, una biografía política. Del Ateneo al Palacio Nacional [Manuel Azaña: A Political Biography. From the Ateneo to the Nationa]. Madrid: Alianza Editorial. ISBN 84-206-9606-4.
- López Villaverde, Ángel Luis (2017). La Segunda República (1931-1936). Las claves para la primera democracia española del siglo XX [The Second Republic (1931–1936). Key aspects of Spain’s first democracy of the 20th century]. Foreword by Ángel Viñas. Madrid: Sílex. ISBN 978-84-7737-527-2.
- Macarro Vera, José Manuel (2000). Socialismo, República y revolución en Andalucía (1931-1936) [Socialism, the Republic, and Revolution in Andalusia (1931–1936)]. Sevilla: Secretariado de Publicaciones de la Universidad de Sevilla. ISBN 84-472-0599-1.
- — (2012). "Los socialistas y la revolución". In Manuel Álvarez Tardío; Fernando del Rey Reguillo (eds.). El laberinto republicano. La democracia española y sus enemigos (1931-1936) [The Republican Labyrinth: Spanish Democracy and Its Enemies (1931–1936)]. Barcelona: RBA. pp. 75–100. ISBN 978-84-9006-357-6.
- Martín Ramos, José Luis (2015). El Frente Popular. Victoria y derrota de la democracia en España [The Popular Front: The Triumph and Downfall of Democracy in Spain]. Barcelona: Pasado & Presente. ISBN 978-84-944272-5-1.
- Palacios Bañuelos, Luis (2021). Historia de la Segunda República española [History of the Second Spanish Republic]. Foreword by Stanley G. Payne. Córdoba: Almuzara. ISBN 978-8418709-54-8.
- Payne, Stanley G. (2005). El colapso de la República. Los orígenes de la Guerra Civil (1933-1939) [The Collapse of the Spanish Republic, 1933-1936: Origins of the Civil War]. Madrid: La Esfera de los Libros. ISBN 84-973-4327-1.
- — (2020) [2016]. El camino al 18 de julio. La erosión de la democracia en España (diciembre de 1935-julio de 1936) [The Path to the 18th of July: The Erosion of Democracy in Spain (December 1935 – July 1936)] (PDF). Barcelona: Espasa. ISBN 978-84-670-5359-3.
- Preston, Paul (2001). La destrucción de la democracia en España. Reforma, reacción y revolución en la Segunda República [The Destruction of Democracy in Spain: Reform, Reaction, and Revolution in the Second Republic]. New revised and expanded edition. Barcelona: Grijalbo Mondadori. ISBN 84-253-3599-X.
- Ranzato, Gabriele (2006). El eclipse de la democracia. La Guerra Civil española y sus orígenes, 1931-1939 [The Eclipse of Democracy: The Spanish Civil War and Its Origins, 1931–1939]. Revision and adaptation of the Spanish edition: Sandra Souto Kustrín. Madrid: Siglo XXI. ISBN 978-84-323-1248-9.
- — (2014). El gran miedo de 1936. Cómo España se precipitó en la Guerra Civil [The Great Fear of 1936: How Spain Plunged into the Civil War]. Madrid: La Esfera de los Libros. ISBN 978-84-9060-022-1.
- Rey Reguillo, Fernando del (2008). Paisanos en lucha: Exclusión política y violencia en la Segunda República Española [Fellow Countrymen in Struggle: Political Exclusion and Violence in the Second Spanish Republic]. Presentation by Mercedes Cabrera. Madrid: Biblioteca Nueva. ISBN 978-84-9742-904-7.
- — (2011). "La República de los socialistas". In Fernando del Rey Reguillo (ed.). Palabras como puños. La intransigencia política en la Segunda República española [Words Like Fists: Political Intransigence in the Second Spanish Republic]. Madrid: Tecnos. pp. 158–225. ISBN 978-84-309-5217-5.
- — (2012). "Políticas de exclusión durante la Segunda República. Un enfoque a ras de suelo". In Manuel Álvarez Tardío; Fernando del Rey Reguillo (eds.). El laberinto republicano. La democracia española y sus enemigos (1931-1936) [The Republican Labyrinth: Spanish Democracy and Its Enemies (1931–1936)]. Barcelona: RBA. pp. 307–334. ISBN 978-84-9006-357-6.
- Robledo, Ricardo (2022). La tierra es vuestra. La reforma agraria. Un problema no resuelto. España: 1900-1950 [The Land Is Yours: Agrarian Reform—An Unresolved Issue. Spain: 1900–1950]. Foreword by Eduardo González Calleja. Barcelona: Pasado & Presente. ISBN 978-84124659-5-2.
- Ruiz, David (1988). Insurrección defensiva y revolución obrera. El octubre español de 1934 [Defensive Uprising and Workers’ Revolution: The Spanish October of 1934]. Barcelona: Labor. ISBN 84-335-9406-0.
- Townson, Nigel (2002) [2000]. La república que no pudo ser. La política de centro en España (1931-1936) [The Republic That Never Was: Centrist Politics in Spain (1931–1936)]. Madrid: Taurus. ISBN 84-306-0487-1.
- — (2009). "¿Vendidos al clericalismo? La política religiosa de los radicales en el segundo bienio, 1933-1935". In Julio de la Cueva and Feliciano Montero (ed.). Laicismo y catolicismo. El conflicto político-religioso en la Segunda República [Secularism and Catholicism: The Political-Religious Conflict in the Second Republic]. Alcalá de Henares: Universidad de Alcalá de Henares. ISBN 978-84-8138-848-0.
- — (2012). "¿Una tercera vía? Política centrista durante la República". In Manuel Álvarez Tardío; Fernando del Rey Reguillo (eds.). El laberinto republicano. La democracia española y sus enemigos (1931-1936) [The Republican Labyrinth: Spanish Democracy and Its Enemies (1931–1936)]. Barcelona: RBA. pp. 161–189. ISBN 978-84-9006-357-6.
- Viñas, Ángel (2019). ¿Quién quiso la guerra civil? Historia de una conspiración [Who Wanted the Civil War? The Story of a Conspiracy] (PDF). Barcelona: Crítica. ISBN 978-84-9199-090-1.
- García Rodríguez, José (2013). Conspiración para la Rebelión militar del 18 de julio de 1936 (del 16 de febrero al 17 de julio) [Conspiracy leading up to the military uprising of July 18, 1936 (February 16–July 17)]. Madrid: Sílex Ediciones. ISBN 978-84-7737-748-1.

Preceded by First biennium	Second biennium of the Second Spanish Republic	Succeeded by Popular Front
