= Revolution of 1934 =

October 1934 series of revolutionary strikes in Spain

- Part of the interwar period
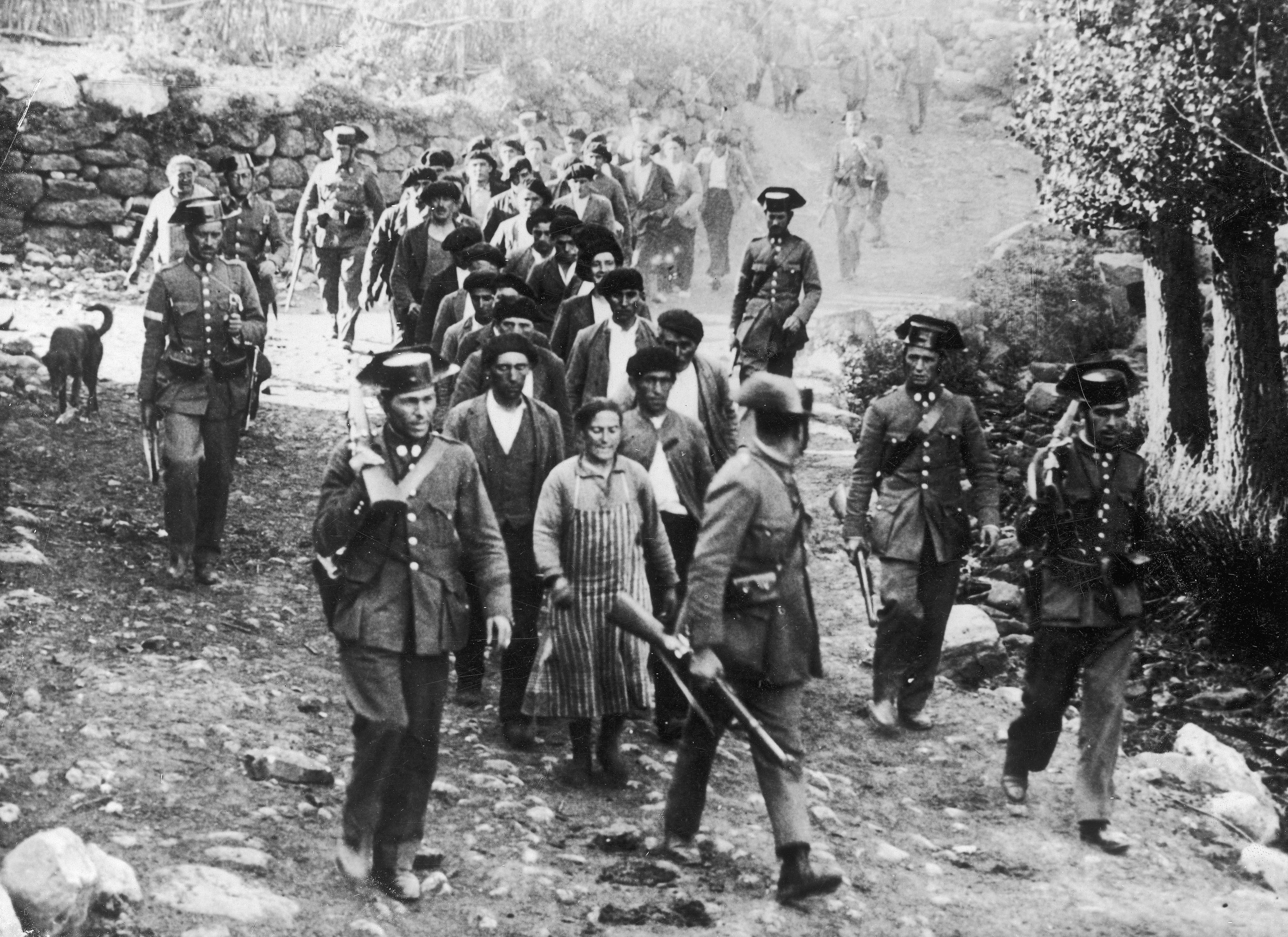
- Civil Guard forces with prisoners in Brañosera
| Date | 5–19 October 1934 |
| Location | Spain (mostly Asturias and Catalonia) |
| Result | Spanish government victory: Rebellions in Asturias and Catalonia defeated |

Belligerents
| Spanish Republic; Spanish Army; Regulares; Legión Española; Civil Guard; Guardia de Asalto; Spanish Navy | Asturian Workers Alliance; PSOE; UGT; CNT; Militias; Catalan State; Mossos d'Esquadra; Escamots |

Commanders and leaders
| (Second Spanish Republic) Niceto Alcalá-Zamora (Second Spanish Republic) Alejandro Lerroux (Second Spanish Republic) Diego Hidalgo y Durán (Second Spanish Republic) Francisco Franco (Second Spanish Republic) Manuel Goded (Second Spanish Republic) Eduardo López Ochoa (Second Spanish Republic) Agustín Muñoz Grandes (Second Spanish Republic) Juan Yagüe (Second Spanish Republic) Domingo Batet (Second Spanish Republic) Lisardo Doval Bravo (Second Spanish Republic) Cecilio Bedia | Belarmino Tomás (surrendered); Ramón González Peña; Teodomiro Menéndez (POW); Ramón Álvarez Palomo Lluís Companys (surrendered); Frederic Escofet (surrendered); Enric Pérez i Farràs (surrendered) |

Casualties and losses
| 450 dead | 1,500–2,000 dead 15,000–30,000 arrested |

The Revolution of 1934 (Spanish: Revolución de 1934), also known as the Revolution of October 1934 or the Revolutionary General Strike of 1934, was an uprising during the "black biennium" of the Second Spanish Republic between 5 and 19 October 1934.

The Revolution of 1934 was triggered by anxiety of the Spanish political left after the 1933 general election and entry of the Spanish Confederation of the Autonomous Right (CEDA) into the Spanish government in September 1934. Most of the events occurred in Catalonia and Asturias, and were supported by many Spanish Socialist Workers' Party (PSOE) and General Union of Workers (UGT) members, notably Largo Caballero, as well as members of the National Confederation of Workers (CNT). The uprisings were repressed by Spanish government forces and defeated within two weeks.

At least 2,000 people were killed during the Revolution of 1934 in the initial uprisings and their suppression. Historians have argued that the revolution increased antagonism between the political right and left, and was one of the causes for the later Spanish Civil War.

== Background ==
=== 1931 election ===
The Second Spanish Republic was established in 1931 amidst growing political instability and radicalization in Spain. The inaugural 1931 general election saw a landslide victory for the republican, the centrist, and the socialist parties. The Spanish Socialist Workers' Party (PSOE) and the Radical Republican Party (PRR), a socialist and a revolutionary party, respectively, the parties with the most votes, formed a "Radical-Socialist" government. The new Spanish Constitution of 1931 and government were both overtly left-wing in nature. This was welcomed by Spain's poor with enthusiasm, hoping that it would finally lead to reforms and an improvement in their living conditions after decades of stagnation. Many laws were soon passed to reduce poverty and improve labor rights. However, over the next two years, tensions between the PSOE and PRR caused the Radical-Socialist government to collapse and trigger a general election.

=== 1933 election ===
The 1933 general election resulted in a centre-right majority: the Spanish right saw large gains while the left saw large reduction of their vote share. The centrists, although their share was reduced, held enough votes to remain in power. The PSOE went from the largest party to the third-largest having lost 56 seats in the Congress of Deputies. The surprising results of the election were a combination of various factors, including anti-Catholic laws and violence, the effective organization of the political opposition, and abstention from the election by members of the powerful anarchist trade union the National Confederation of Labour (CNT). The political party with the most votes was the Spanish Confederation of the Autonomous Right (CEDA), which united a number of centre-right and far-right parties under its umbrella, and campaigned hard against the more controversial laws and actions of the Radical-Socialist government. President Niceto Alcalá-Zamora decided not to invite CEDA leader José María Gil-Robles to form a government, possibly because his party had not yet adhered to the republican system. Instead, Alcalá-Zamora invited the PRR leader Alejandro Lerroux to do so, in what author Hugh Thomas called a "weakening of the democratic process." CEDA supported the multi-party government for nearly a year without being a part of it, despite being the largest single party in parliament. On 26 September 1934, after a year of intense pressure, CEDA was finally successful in forcing Lerroux to give three ministries to the party.

The inclusion of CEDA into the Spanish government was not well accepted by the left, who accused Alcalá-Zamora of handing over the Republic to its enemies, and viewed the CEDA as a signal of the advance of fascism in Spain. They appealed to the cases of Engelbert Dollfuss becoming Chancellor of Austria in 1932 and Adolf Hitler becoming Chancellor of Germany in January to justify the use of force for defensive purposes. However, historian Salvador de Madariaga, himself a supporter of Manuel Azaña and an exiled vocal opponent of Francisco Franco, asserted that: "The argument that [Gil Robles] tried to destroy the Constitution to establish fascism was, at once, hypocritical and false". (Note: In the original: “El alzamiento de 1934 es imperdonable. La decisión del presidente de la República de llamar al poder a la CEDA era inatacable y hasta debida desde hacía ya tiempo. El argumento de que el señor Gil Robles intentaba destruir la Constitución para instaurar el fascismo era, a la vez, hipócrita y falso. ….. Con la rebelión de 1934, la izquierda española perdió hasta la sombra de autoridad para condenar la rebelión de 1936.") The issue was that the left identified the Republic not with democracy or constitutional law, but with a specific set of left-wing policies and politicians. Any deviation, even if democratic, was seen as treasonous. The "founding fathers" of the Republican system had conceived the new democracy as belonging to them, and were more concerned with the radical reforms which in their view were necessary than with pluralism and freedom. The Socialists triggered an insurrection that they had been preparing for nine months. A general strike was called by the General Union of Workers (UGT) and the PSOE in the name of the Alianza Obrera, 'Workers' Alliance'.

=== Preparation ===
Spain had been subject to constant clashes in the form of small incidents and short general strikes, which allowed the revolutionary movement to arrive on the eve of October in the fullness of its strength, with great confidence and extraordinarily united. Many left-wing and far-left organizations, either endorsed or tolerated by the Republican government, were well-organized and prepared for such an action. They had a considerable stock of rifles and pistols on them. Most of the rifles came from a shipment of arms supplied by Indalecio Prieto, a socialist party moderate, on the yacht Turquesa at Pravia, north-east of Oviedo. Prieto swiftly fled to France to avoid arrest. Other weapons came from captured arms factories in the region and the miners also had their dynamite blasting charges, which were known as "the artillery of the revolution."

== Asturias ==
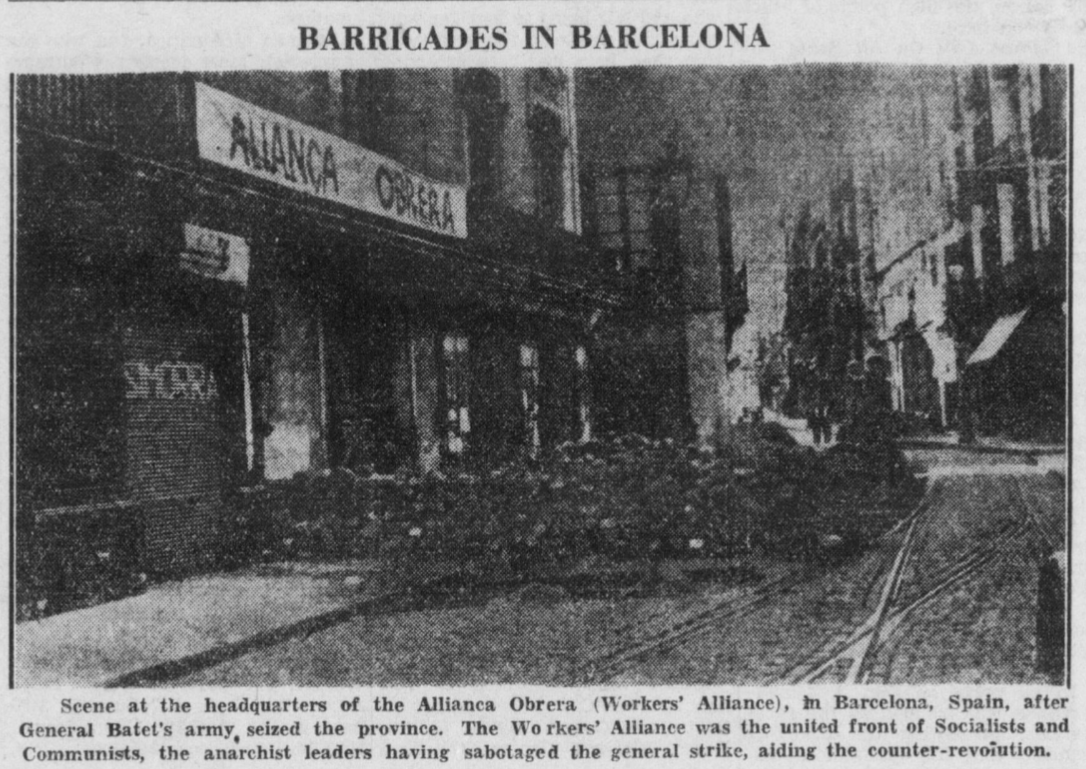
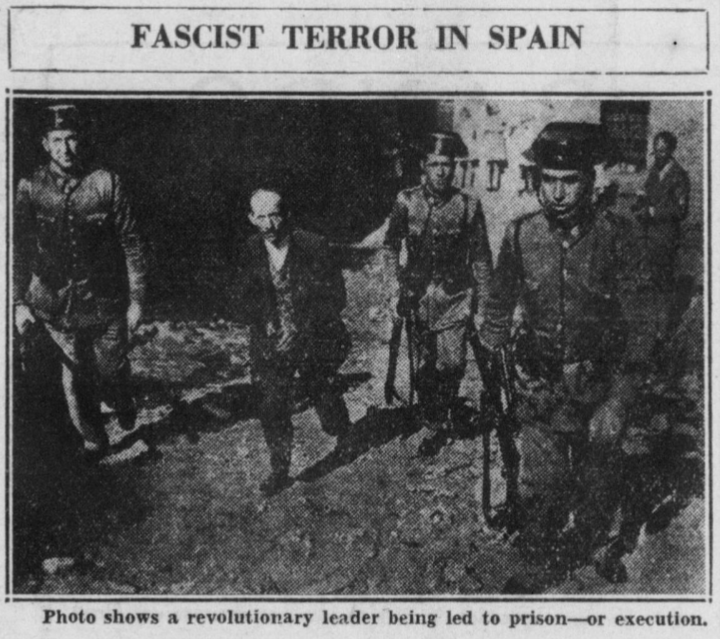
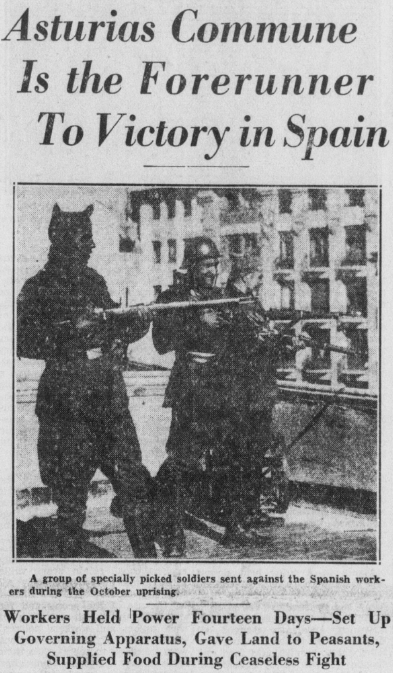
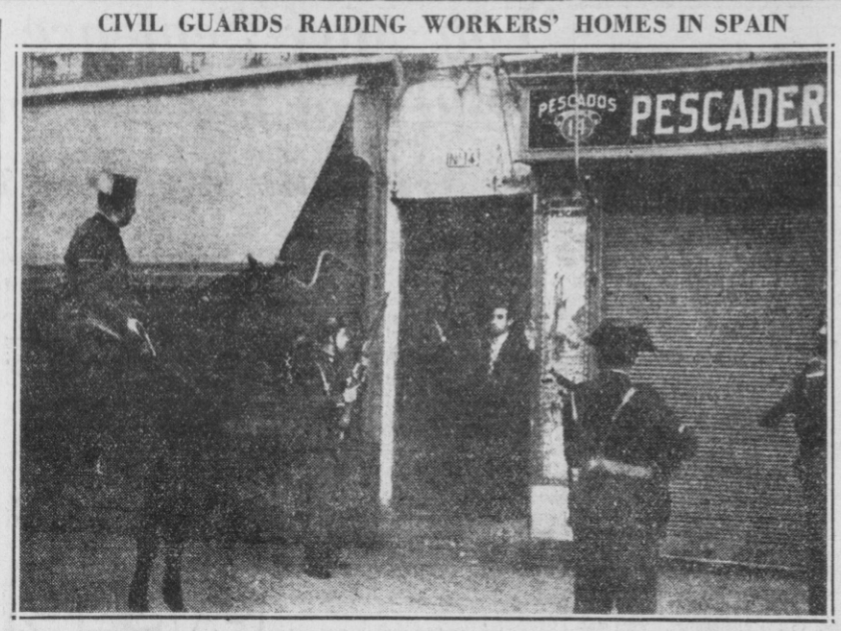
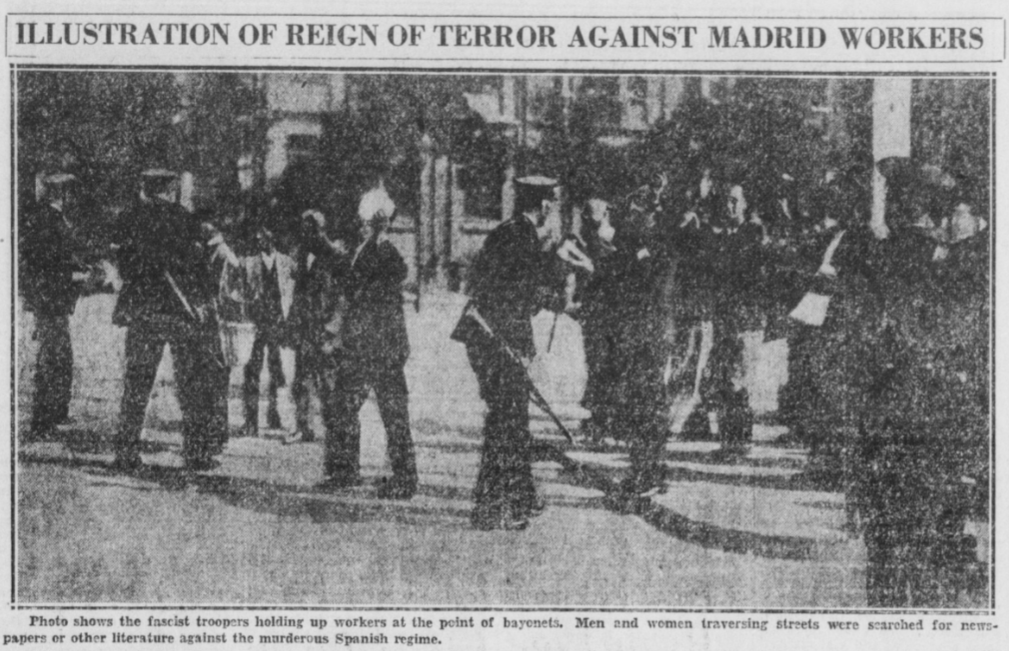
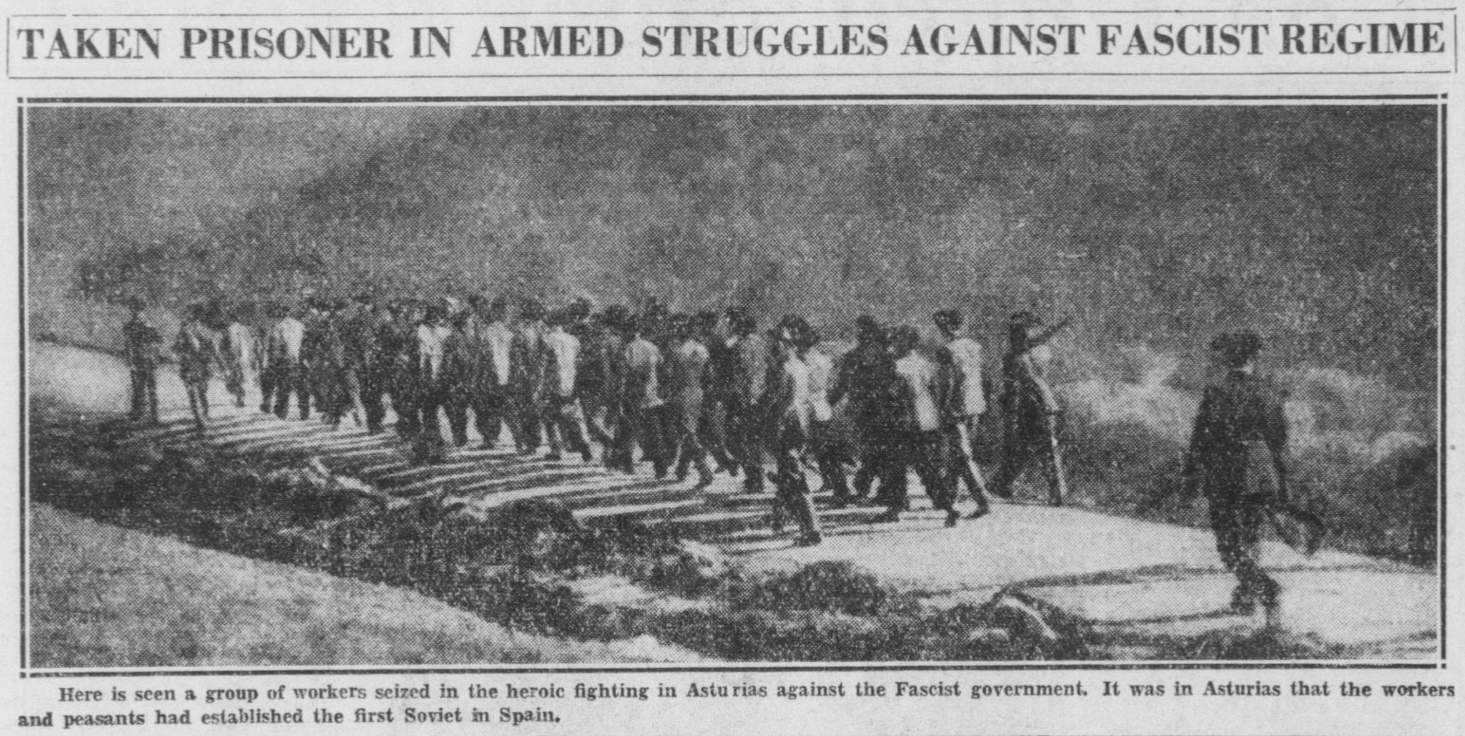
Images from the Revolution of 1934

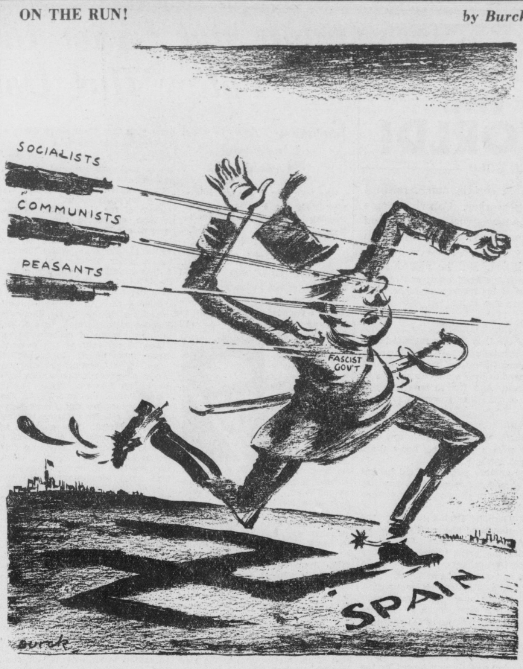
"On the Run!" Daily Worker October 10, 1934

The rising in Asturias was well prepared with headquarters in Oviedo. In several mining towns in Asturias, local unions gathered small arms and were determined to see the strike through. Fighting began on the evening of 4 October, with the miners occupying several towns, attacking and seizing local Civil Guard and Assault Guard barracks.

At dawn on 5 October, the rebels attacked the Catholic Brothers' school in Turón. The Brothers and the Passionist Fathers were captured and imprisoned in the "House of the People" while waiting for a decision from the Revolutionary Committee. Under pressure from extremists, the Committee condemned them to death. 34 priests, six young seminarians aged 18 to 21, and several businessmen and Civil Guards were summarily executed by the revolutionaries in Mieres and Sama. 58 religious buildings including churches, convents, and part of the University of Oviedo were burned and destroyed. The same day saw columns of miners advancing along the road to Oviedo, the provincial capital of Asturias. Taking Oviedo, the rebels were able to seize the city's arsenal gaining 24,000 rifles, carbines, and light and heavy machine guns. Recruitment offices demanded the services of all workers between the ages of eighteen and forty for the "Red Army". Thirty thousand workers were mobilized for battle within ten days. With the exception of two barracks in which fighting with the garrison of 1,500 government troops continued, the city was taken by 6 October. The miners proceeded to occupy several other towns, most notably the large industrial centre of La Felguera, and set up town assemblies, or "revolutionary committees", to govern the towns that they controlled.

Within three days, the center of Asturias was in the hands of the rebels. The revolutionary soviets set up by the miners attempted to impose order on the areas under their control, and the moderate socialist leadership of Ramón González Peña and Belarmino Tomás took measures to restrain violence. In the occupied areas, the rebels officially declared the proletarian revolution and abolished regular money.

The Spanish government was now facing a civil war. Franco, already General of Division and aide to Minister of War Diego Hidalgo, was put in command of operations to suppress the violent insurgency. Franco and General Manuel Goded Llopis advised Hidalgo to bring in the battle-tested Spanish Army of Africa, composed of the Spanish Legion and the Moroccan Regulares. Historian Hugh Thomas asserts that Hidalgo said that he did not want young inexperienced recruits fighting their own people, and that he was wary of moving troops to Asturias, leaving the rest of Spain unprotected. Bringing in the Army of Africa was not a novelty; in 1932 Manuel Azaña had also called the Tercio and the Regulares from North Africa. Hidalgo wanted Franco to lead the troops, but President Alcalá-Zamora, aware of Franco's monarchist sympathies, chose General Eduardo López Ochoa to lead the troops against the miners, trusting that his reputation as a loyal Republican would minimize the bloodshed, which turned brutal anyway. After two weeks of heavy fighting done by troops from the Army of Africa with a death toll of 2000, the rebellion was suppressed. As a deterrent to further atrocities, López Ochoa summarily executed a number of Legionnaires and Regulares for torturing or murdering prisoners.

Historian Javier Tusell argues that although Franco had a leading role, giving instructions from Madrid, that does not mean he took part in the illegal repressive activities. According to Tusell it was López Óchoa, a republican, who had been appointed by President Alcalá Zamora to lead the repression in the field, that was unable to prevent numerous atrocities.

According to Hugh Thomas, 2,000 persons died in the uprising: 230–260 military and police, 33 priests, 1,500 miners in combat and 200 individuals killed in the repression. Stanley Payne estimates that the rebel atrocities killed between 50 and 100 people and that the government conducted up to 100 summary executions, while 15 million pesetas were stolen from banks, most which was never recovered and funded further revolutionary activity.

== Catalonia ==
In Catalonia the revolt was triggered by the predominantly left-wing Government of Catalonia led by its president Lluís Companys, who proclaimed the Catalan State. The Catalonian uprising began and ended the same day, it lasted only ten hours, in the so-called "Events of 6 October".

On 6 October, Companys decided to declare the Catalan State within the "Spanish Federal Republic", and numerous heavily armed squads occupied the streets of Barcelona and other towns, supporting the initiative and capturing public offices. Companys appeared on a balcony of the Palau de la Generalitat and told the crowd that "monarchists and fascists" had "assaulted the government", and went on:

In this solemn hour, in the name of the people and the Parliament, the Government over which I preside assumes all the faculties of power in Catalonia, proclaims the Catalan State of the Spanish Federal Republic, and in establishing and fortifying relations with the leaders of the general protest against Fascism, invites them to establish in Catalonia the provisional Government of the Republic, which will find in our Catalan people the most generous impulse of fraternity in the common desire to erect a liberal and magnificent federal republic.

Companys asked Azaña, who happened to be in Barcelona during the events, to lead a newly proclaimed Spanish Republican government, a proposition that Azaña rejected. Lluís Companys also telephoned General Domènec Batet, who was deployed in Catalonia as chief of the IV Organic Division, asking him for support. Batet remained loyal to Madrid and gained some time demanding a written request. While Companys wrote the request, Batet prepared the local Spanish Army, Civil Guard, and Assault Guards for the imminent proclamation. At 9 pm, Batet declared martial law, moving against trade union and militia headquarters, both of whom surrendered quickly, then brought light artillery to bear against the Barcelona city hall and the Generalitat. Fighting continued until 6 am the next day, when Companys surrendered.

In the failed rebellion, 46 people died: 38 civilians and 8 soldiers. More than three thousand people were imprisoned, most of them in the Uruguay steamer, and placed under the jurisdiction of the councils of war.

Although the vast majority of the events happened in Asturias and Catalonia, there were strikes, clashes, and shootings in the Basque country, northern Castile and León, Cantabria, and Madrid.

== Aftermath ==
The insurgency in Asturias sparked a new era of violent anti-Catholic persecutions, initiated the practice of atrocities against the clergy and sharpened the antagonism between Spanish left and right. Franco and López Ochoa (who, prior to the campaign in Asturias, had been seen as a left-leaning officer) emerged as officers prepared to use 'troops against Spanish civilians as if they were a foreign enemy'. Franco described the rebellion to a journalist in Oviedo as, 'a frontier war and its fronts are socialism, communism and whatever attacks civilisation in order to replace it with barbarism.' Though the colonial units sent to the north by the government at Franco's recommendation consisted of the Spanish Foreign Legion and the Moroccan Regulares Indigenas, the right wing press portrayed the Asturian rebels as lackeys of a foreign Jewish-Bolshevik conspiracy. Some time after these events, Franco was briefly commander-in-chief of the Army of Africa (from 15 February onwards), and from 19 May 1935, on, Chief of the General Staff.

After the "miners" had surrendered the investigations and repression were carried out by the brutal Civil Guard Major Lisardo Doval Bravo who applied torture and savage beatings. Several prisoners died. The independent journalist “Luis de Sirval” was arbitrarily arrested and shot dead in prison by a Bulgarian Legionnaire named Dimitri Ivan Ivanoff. Due to martial law and censorship, little or no information was officially made public, a group of Socialist deputies carried a private investigation and published an independent report that discarded most to the publicized atrocities but that confirmed the savage beatings and tortures.

In Catalonia Lluís Companys and his government were arrested. So too was Manuel Azaña, despite having taken no part in the events; he was released in December. The Statute of Autonomy was suspended indefinitely on 14 December, and all powers that had been transferred to Barcelona were returned to Madrid. The soldiers who had taken part of the insurrection, the commander Enric Pérez i Farràs and the captains Escofet and Ricart, were condemned to death, their sentence being commuted to life imprisonment by the President of the Republic, Alcalá Zamora, in spite of the protests of both the CEDA and the Republican Liberal Democrat Party of Melquiades Álvarez, who demanded a strong hand.

Martial law was in place until 23 January 1935. The government tried to be and was reasonable in dealing with insurrectionists in most cases, but in Asturias justice was uneven and the police administration was allowed to continue with excesses. On 23 February 1935, the Mayor of Barcelona and the detained councilors were provisionally released. In June 1935 The President and the Government of the Generalitat were tried by the Constitutional Guarantees Tribunal and were sentenced for military rebellion to thirty years in prison, which was carried out by some in the Cartagena prison and others in the Puerto de Santa María.

The government of Lerroux unleashed "a harsh repressive wave with the closure of political and trade union centers, the suppression of newspapers, the removal of municipalities and thousands of detainees, without having had a direct action on the facts", which showed "a punitive will often arbitrary and with vengeance components of class or ideological".

Ramón Gonzáles Peña the prominent leader of the Oviedo Revolutionary Committee was sentenced to death. One year later, however, he was reprieved. Gonzáles later served as the president of Unión General de Trabajadores, in which he was in conflict with Largo Caballero. He was also a Member of Parliament and was the Minister of Justice 1938–1939. After the Spanish Civil War González Peña went to exile in Mexico, where he died on 27 July 1952.

There were no mass killing after the fighting was over, completely different from the massacres that had taken place in similar uprisings in France, Hungary or Germany; all death sentences were commuted aside from two, army sergeant and deserter Diego Vásquez, who fought alongside the miners, and a worker known as "El Pichilatu" who had committed serial killings. Little effort was actually made to suppress the organisations that had carried out the insurrection, resulting in most being functional again by 1935. Support for fascism was minimal and did not increase, while civil liberties were restored in full by 1935, after which the revolutionaries had a generous opportunity to pursue power through electoral means.

Following the Spanish general election of 1936, the new government of Manuel Azaña released Companys and his government from jail.

At the outbreak of the Spanish Civil War, López Ochoa was in a military hospital in Carabanchel and was awaiting trial, accused of responsibility for the deaths of 20 civilians at a barracks in Oviedo. Given the violence occurring throughout Madrid, the government attempted to move Ochoa from the hospital to a safer location but was twice prevented from doing so by large hostile crowds. A third attempt was made under the guise that Ochoa was already dead, but the ruse was exposed and the general was taken away. One account states that an anarchist dragged him from the coffin in which he was lying and shot him in the hospital garden. His head was hacked off, stuck on a pole and publicly paraded. His remains were then displayed with a sign reading "This is the butcher of Asturias."

The eight martyrs of Turon were venerated on 7 September 1989, and beatified By Pope John Paul II on 29 April 1990. They were canonized on 21 November 1999.

== See also ==
- Asturian miners' strike of 1934
- Events of 6 October
- Martyrs of Turon
- Ramón González Peña
- Second biennium of the Second Spanish Republic

== Sources ==
- Álvarez, José E. (2011). "The Spanish Foreign Legion during the Asturian Uprising of October 1934". War in History. 18 (2): 200–224. doi:10.1177/0968344510393599. ISSN 0968-3445. JSTOR 26098598. S2CID 159593285.
- Casanova, Julián (2010). The Spanish Republic and Civil War. Cambridge University Press. p. 113. ISBN 978-1139490573.
- Cueva, Julio de la Cueva (1998). "Religious Persecution, Anticlerical Tradition and Revolution: On Atrocities against the Clergy during the Spanish Civil War". Journal of Contemporary History. 33 (3). Sage Publications, Ltd.: 355–369.
- Hodges, Gabrielle Ashfod (2002). Franco : a concise biography (1st U.S. ed.). St. Martin's Press. ISBN 978-0312282851.
- Jackson, Gabriel (1987). The Spanish Republic and the Civil War,1931-1939. Princeton University Press. ISBN 978-0691007571.
- Payne, Stanley G. (1987). The Franco Regime. Madison, Wisconsin: University of Wisconsin Press. ISBN 978-0299110703.
- Payne, Stanley G. (1999). Spain's First Democracy: The Second Republic, 1931-1936. University of Wisconsin Press. ISBN 978-0299136741.
- Payne, Stanley G. (2006). The collapse of the Spanish republic, 1933-1936: Origins of the civil war. Yale University Press. ISBN 978-0300110654.
- Payne, Stanley G. (2008). The Spanish Civil War, the Soviet Union, and Communism. Yale University Press. ISBN 978-0300130782.
- Payne, Stanley G.; Palacios, Jesús (2018). Franco: A Personal and Political Biography (4th ed.). University of Wisconsin Press. ISBN 978-0299302146.
- Preston, Paul (1994). "General Franco as Military Leader". Transactions of the Royal Historical Society. 4. Cambridge University Press: 21–41. doi:10.2307/3679213. ISSN 1474-0648. JSTOR 3679213. S2CID 153836234.
- Preston, Paul (1995). Franco. Fontana. ISBN 978-0-00-686210-9.
- Preston, Paul (2006). The Spanish Civil War: Reaction, Revolution and Revenge (3rd ed.). London: HarperCollins. ISBN 978-0-00-723207-9.
- Preston, Paul (2012). The Spanish Holocaust: Inquisition and Extermination in Twentieth-Century Spain. W. W. Norton & Company. ISBN 978-0393345919.
- Ruiz, Julius (2015). The 'Red Terror' and the Spanish Civil War: Revolutionary Violence in Madrid. Cambridge: Cambridge University Press. ISBN 978-1107682931.
- Thomas, Hugh (1977). The Spanish Civil War. Harper & Row. ISBN 978-0060142780.
- Tusell, Javier (1992). Franco en la guerra civil - Una biografia política (in Spanish) (1st ed.). Editorial Tusquets. ISBN 9788472236486.
- Tusell, Javier (1996). La Dictadura de Franco (in Spanish) (1st ed.). Altaya. ISBN 9788448706371.
