= Sovereign Council of Asturias and León =

Unrecognized state in Spain (1936–37) during the Spanish Civil War

Sovereign Council of Asturias and León Consejo Soberano de Asturias y León Conseyu Soberanu d'Asturies y Llión
- 1936^{a}–1937
- Coat of arms

- Status: Unrecognized state
- Capital: Gijón
- Common languages: Asturian, Castilian
- Government: Council republic
- President
  - 1936–1937: Belarmino Tomás
- Historical era: Spanish Civil War
  - Established: 6 September 1936^{a}
  - Legalized by the Second Spanish Republic government: 23 December 1936
  - Independence proclamation: 24 August 1937
  - Disestablished: 21 October 1937
Preceded by	Succeeded by
Second Spanish Republic	Spanish State
- Today part of: Spain ∟Asturias
- a. As the Interprovincial Council of Asturias and León

The Sovereign Council of Asturias and León (Spanish: Consejo Soberano de Asturias y León, Asturian: Conseyu Soberanu d'Asturies y Llión), was an unrecognized state in northern Spain during the Spanish Civil War. Proclaimed on 6 September 1936, it was self-declared sovereign on 24 August 1937, while the region was occupied on 20 October 1937 by Franco's military forces. Belarmino Tomás was the Sovereign Council's first and only President. The capital of the short-lived state was Gijón.

== Context ==
In Asturias, where the UGT and the CNT were especially active, there had been a kind of Libertarian socialist revolution. The isolation of the northern front, 200 kilometers from the closest republican positions, with a shortage of war and food supplies, caused local powers to assume command of militias and coin minting, functions that were previously the responsibility of the republican government.

In June 1936, a war committee was established in Gijón by the anarchists of the CNT and chaired by Segundo Blanco, it had war, transportation, supply and health commissions. Meanwhile, in Sama de Langreo, a popular committee of socialist predominance had also emerged, this was chaired by Ramón González Peña.

== History ==
The Interprovincial Council of Asturias and León was born on 6 September 1936, as an agreement between anarchists and socialists, and with representation of all the Republican faction in Asturias. On 23 December 1936, the Second Spanish Republic government recognized the Interprovincial Council of Asturias and León as well as other councils in the country (the Regional Defence Council of Aragon and the Interprovincial Council of Santander, Palencia and Burgos) as autonomous entities. Independence was declared on 24 August 1937, when the city of Santander fell to Nationalist forces, leaving the remaining republican forces in Asturias isolated several hundred miles from those republican forces in the southern and eastern parts of Spain. The leaders of the new nation claimed that declaring the independence should not be considered as a defiance against the Republican government, but rather an attempt to concentrate the local defense against Franco's forces in the War in the North campaign. The Sovereign Council issued its own currency as there was not enough from Spain due to the isolation of Asturias. These bills were popularly known as belarminos, the name of Belarmino Tomás, President of the Sovereign Council.

Stress created led to clashes between some ministers. The idea of independence was supported by Belarmino Tomás and the majority of leaders of PSOE, as well as by Segundo Blanco and other officials of the CNT. Rafael Fernández Álvarez condemned the decree of sovereignty but remained at his governmental post. The two UGT representatives had different opinion each one. The PCE criticized the decision and the ministers of the Republican Left rejected it. The Government of the Republic actively censored the Sovereign Council, especially when it addressed the League of Nations.

Aid to continue resistance against Franco's forces was requested of the Republican government, then based in Valencia, and although military aid was sent, it arrived the day before the fall of Gijón to the Nationalist forces and the end of the provisional government on 20 October 1937. The different services of the administration were organized until the time of evacuation on the night of October 20, 1937, the last meeting of the Sovereign Council was held earlier that day. The next day, the troops of the Nationalists entered Gijón.

== Organization ==
Position	Name	Organization
President and Commander-in-Chief	Belarmino Tomás	PSOE
Industry	Segundo Blanco	CNT
Labour	Onofre García Tirador	FAI
Health	Ramón G. Posada	FIJL
Treasury	Rafael Fernández Álvarez	JSU
Justice and Public Order	Luis Roca de Albornoz	JSU
Agriculture	Gonzalo López	PCE
Merchant Navy	Valentín Calleja	UGT
Fishing	Ramón Álvarez Palomo	FAI
Public education	Juan Ambou	PCE
Public works	José Maldonado	IR
Social care	Maximiliano Llamedo	CNT
Commerce	Amador Fernández	PSOE
Communications	Avelino Roces	UGT
Propaganda	Antonio Ortega	IR

== Legacy ==
On the republican side the cause of the loss of the north were analyzed, the article entitled Why the North was lost? (published in El Socialista on October 30, 1937) emphasizes the lack of unity and political decisions that damaged military plans, highlighting the almost total passivity of Madrid in the defense of the north.

The city of Gijón proudly proclaims its resistance to Franco's forces and its temporary role as the seat of anti-Franco resistance in northern Spain to this day.
