= Asturian Revolution of 1934 =

October 1934 insurrection in Spain

- Part of the Revolution of 1934
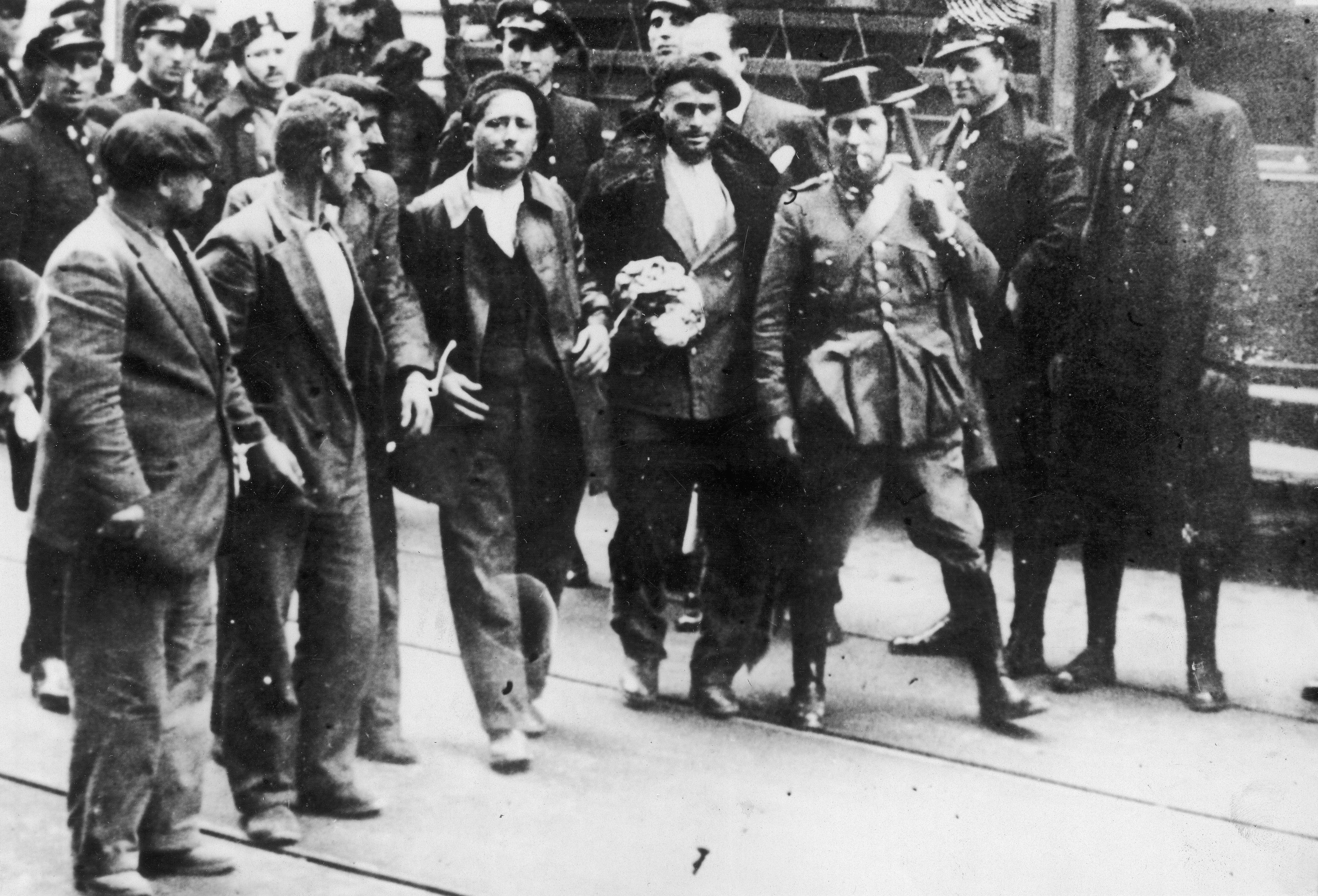
- Striking workers arrested by Guardia de Asalto and Guardia Civil police forces during the Asturian insurrection
- Date: 4–19 October 1934
- Location: Asturias, Spain
- Caused by: Asturian miners' strike
- Result: Revolution suppressed

Parties
Asturian Workers Alliance: PSOE; UGT; CNT; Militias	(Second Spanish Republic) Spanish Republic: Spanish Army; Spanish Navy

Lead figures
Belarmino Tomás; Ramón González Peña; Ramón Álvarez Palomo	(Second Spanish Republic) Alejandro Lerroux (Second Spanish Republic) Diego Hidalgo (Second Spanish Republic) Eduardo López Ochoa (Second Spanish Republic) Francisco Franco (Second Spanish Republic) Juan Yagüe

Casualties and losses
1,700 dead 15,000–30,000 captured	260 dead

The Asturian Revolution was a major conflict that happened in Asturias from 4–19 October 1934. It started with a mass strike action undertaken by miners in Asturias against the new government which included the conservative CEDA party. The strike and subsequent demonstrations eventually developed into a violent revolutionary uprising in an attempt to overthrow the government. The revolutionaries took over Asturias by force, killing many of the province's police and religious leaders. Armed with dynamite, rifles, and machine guns, they destroyed religious buildings, such as churches and convents. The rebels officially declared a Proletarian Revolution and instituted a local government in the territory. The rebellion was crushed by the Spanish Navy and the Spanish Republican Army, the latter using mainly colonial troops from Spanish Morocco.

The war minister, Diego Hidalgo wanted Francisco Franco to lead the troops against the rebellion but Spain's president, Alcalá Zamora, opted to send general Eduardo López Ochoa to Asturias to lead the government forces in an effort to limit the bloodshed. Soldiers from the Civil Guard, colonial troops, and the Spanish Legion were dispatched under López Ochoa and Colonel Juan Yagüe to relieve the besieged government garrisons and to retake the towns from the miners. The brevity of the confrontation led historian Gabriel Jackson to observe

"every form of fanaticism and cruelty which was to characterise the Civil War occurred during the October revolution and its aftermath: utopian revolution marred by sporadic red terror; systematically bloody repression by the ‘forces of order’; confusion and demoralisation of the moderate left; fanatical vengefulness on the part of the right."

The revolt has been regarded as "the first battle of" or "the prelude to" the Spanish Civil War. According to hispanist Edward Malefakis, the Spanish left had rejected "legal processes of government" and revolted against the possibility of a right-led coalition. Even though they would later use the "legality" argument to condemn the July 1936 right-wing coup, their own uprising was also itself against an elected government. Historian Salvador de Madariaga, a supporter of Manuel Azaña, and an exiled vocal opponent of Francisco Franco asserted that:

"The uprising of 1934 is unforgivable. ... The argument that [the conservatives] intended to destroy the Constitution to establish fascism was both hypocritical and false. [With the rebellion], the Spanish left was without even the shadow of moral authority to condemn the rebellion of 1936". (Note: In the original: “El alzamiento de 1934 es imperdonable. La decisión del presidente de la República de llamar al poder a la CEDA era inatacable y hasta debida desde hacía ya tiempo. El argumento de que el señor Gil Robles intentaba destruir la Constitución para instaurar el fascismo era, a la vez, hipócrita y falso. ….. Con la rebelión de 1934, la izquierda española perdió hasta la sombra de autoridad para condenar la rebelión de 1936.")

== Political background ==
The majority vote in the 1933 elections was won by the conservative Spanish Confederation of the Autonomous Right (CEDA). President Alcalá-Zamora declined to invite its leader, Gil Robles, to form a government. Instead he invited the Radical Republican Party's Alejandro Lerroux to do so. Despite receiving the most votes, CEDA was denied cabinet positions for nearly a year. After a year of political pressure, CEDA, the largest party in the congress, was finally successful in forcing the acceptance of three ministries. However the entrance of CEDA in the government, although being normal in a parliamentary democracy, was not well accepted by the left. When the plans to invite members of the right-wing CEDA into government were leaked, the political left was distraught. The left tried to reach a common formula of protest but were hampered because the formation of a new government was the result of a normal parliamentary process and that the parties coming to government had won the previous year's free elections. The issue was that the left identified the Republic not with democracy or constitutional law but a specific set of policies and politicians, and any deviation was seen as treasonous. That triggered revolutionary strikes and uprisings in Asturias and in Catalonia as well as small incidents in other places in Spain, all a part of the Revolution of 1934.

At the same time, CEDA could hardly be seen as a democratic force. It called for the revision of the republican constitution, with the aim to create a new regime and defend "Christian civilization" from leftism and Marxism. Its leader, José María Gil-Robles, declared his intention to "give Spain a true unity, a new spirit, a totalitarian polity..." and went on to say "Democracy is not an end but a mean to achieve the conquest of the new state. When the time comes, either parliament submits or we will eliminate it." The CEDA held fascist-style rallies, called Gil-Robles "Jefe", the equivalent of Duce, and claimed that the CEDA might lead a "March on Madrid" (similar to the Italian Fascist March on Rome) to forcefully seize power. The fact that this force won a relative majority in the congress, made many republicans fear a return to the monarchy or a dictatorship like that of Miguel Primo de Rivera, and hardened the most radical left in its belief that a fascist danger was rising and a revolution necessary.

== Preparations ==
The rebels had stockpiled rifles and pistols, leading to general Emilio Mola calling them the "best armed" of all the leftist insurrections of interwar Europe. Most of the rifles came from a shipment of arms supplied by Indalecio Prieto, a socialist party moderate. The rifles had been landed by the yacht Turquesa at Pravia, north-west of Oviedo; Prieto swiftly fled to France to avoid arrest. Other weapons came from captured arms factories in the region and the miners also had their dynamite blasting charges, which were known as "la artillería de la revolución." Plans to subvert police and army units failed as these groups, even those with leftist sympathies, refused to join the rebels. Most planned armed revolts involving militiamen did not go ahead and the others were easily crushed by the authorities. A "Catalan State", proclaimed by Catalan nationalist leader Lluis Companys, lasted just ten hours, and despite an attempt at a general stoppage in Madrid, other strikes did not endure. In Madrid, strikers occupied the ministry of the interior and a few military centres, a few of them firing pistols, yet they were soon rounded up by security forces. In the north there were revolutionary strikes in mining areas and clashes with the security forces that left 40 people dead, but the revolt was ended with the arrival of troops and the Spanish air force launching bomb attacks. This left Asturian strikers to fight alone. Anarchist and communist factions in Spain had called general strikes. However, the strikes immediately exposed differences on the left between the Spanish Socialist Workers' Party (PSOE)-linked Unión General de Trabajadores (UGT), which organised the strike, and the anarcho-syndicalist trade union, the Confederación Nacional del Trabajo (CNT). As a result, the strikes failed in much of the country.

== Strike and rising ==
Location of Asturias in Spain

In several coal mining towns in Asturias, where the Central Asturian Carboniferous Basin is located, local unions gathered small weaponry in preparation for the strike. It began on the evening of 4 October, with the miners occupying several towns, attacking and seizing local Civil and Assault Guard barracks. At dawn on 5 October, the rebels attacked the Brothers' school in Turón. The Brothers and the Passionist Father were captured and imprisoned in the "House of the People" while waiting for a decision from the revolutionary Committee. Under pressure from extremists, the Committee decided to condemn them to death. Thirty four priests, six young seminarists with ages between 18 and 21, and several businessmen and civil guards were summarily executed by the revolutionaries in Mieres and Sama, 58 religious buildings including churches, convents and part of the university at Oviedo were burned and destroyed.

The same day, large groups of miners advanced along the road to Oviedo, the provincial capital. With the exception of two barracks in which fighting with the garrison of 1,500 government troops continued, the city was taken by 6 October. The miners proceeded to occupy several other towns, most notably the large industrial centre of La Felguera, and set up town assemblies, or "revolutionary committees", to govern the towns that they controlled.

Taking Oviedo, the rebels were able to seize the city's arsenal gaining 24,000 rifles, carbines and light and heavy machine guns. Recruitment offices drafted all workers between the ages of eighteen and forty for the 'Red Army'. Thirty thousand workers had been mobilized for battle within ten days. In the occupied areas the rebels officially declared the proletarian revolution and abolished regular money. The revolutionary soviets set up by the miners attempted to impose order on the areas under their control, and the moderate socialist leadership of Ramón González Peña and Belarmino Tomás took measures to restrain violence. However, a number of captured priests, businessmen and civil guards were summarily executed by the revolutionaries in Mieres and Sama.

== Government response ==
The government in Madrid was now facing a civil war and called on two of its senior generals, Manuel Goded and Francisco Franco, to co-ordinate the suppression of what had become a major rebellion. Goded and Franco recommended the use of regular colonial units from the "Army of Africa" in Spanish Morocco, instead of the inexperienced conscripts of the Peninsular Army. War Minister Diego Hidalgo agreed that the latter would be at a disadvantage in combat against the well-organised miners, who were skilled in the use of dynamite. Historian Hugh Thomas asserts that Hidalgo said that he did not want young inexperienced recruits fighting their own people and he was wary of moving troops to Asturias leaving the rest of Spain unprotected. In 1932, Manuel Azaña had also called the Tercio and the regulares (colonial troops) from North Africa to join in the suppression.

The war minister, Diego Hidalgo, wanted Franco to lead the troops but President Alcalá Zamora selected General López Ochoa, a Republican, to lead the government forces in order to minimize possible bloodshed. Soldiers from the civil guards, Moroccan Regulares and the Spanish Legion were accordingly organized under General Eduardo López Ochoa and Colonel Juan de Yagüe to relieve the besieged government garrisons and to retake the towns from the miners. During the operations, an autogyro made a reconnaissance flight for the government troops in what was the first military employment of a rotorcraft.

== Repression ==
On 7 October, delegates from the anarchist-controlled seaport towns of Gijón and Avilés arrived in Oviedo to request weapons to defend against a landing of government troops. Ignored by the socialist UGT-controlled committee, the delegates returned to their town empty-handed, and government troops met little resistance as they recaptured Gijón and Avilés the following day. On the same day, the cruiser Libertad and two gunboats reached Gijón, where they fired on the workers at the shore. Bombers also attacked coalfields and Oviedo. After two weeks of heavy fighting (and a death toll estimated between 1,200 and 2,000), the rebellion was suppressed. General López Ochoa ordered the summary executions of six legionnaires and Moroccan colonial troops for raping, torturing, and murdering prisoners, some of whom had been hacked to death. Historian Javier Tusell argues that although Franco had a leading role, giving instructions from Madrid, that does not mean he took part in the illegal repressive activities. According to Tussell it was López de Óchoa, a republican freemason who had been appointed by President Zamora to lead the repression in the field, who was unable to limit bloodshed.

== Aftermath ==
In the days following the strike, Spain's prime minister, Lerroux, was widely seen as the country's "savior". In turn, groups of socialists, anarchists and communists put forth a variety of propaganda justifying the rebellion and representing the suppressing as a martyrdom. In the armed action taken against the uprising, some 1,500 miners were killed, with another 30,000 to 40,000 taken prisoner and thousands more became unemployed. The repression of the uprising carried out by the colonial troops included looting, rape and summary executions. Lisardo Doval, a civil guard commander and major-general, was responsible for many of these repression strategies. According to Hugh Thomas, 2,000 people died in the uprising: 230-260 military and police, 33 priests, 1,500 miners in combat and 200 individuals killed in the repression. Among those killed, journalist Luis de Sirval was a well-known opponent of tortures and executions, eventually being arrested and killed by three officers of the Legion. Stanley Payne, an American historian, estimates that the rebel's armed conflict killed between 50 and 100 people and that the government conducted up to 100 summary executions, while 15 million pesetas were stolen from banks, most of which was never recovered and would go on to fund further revolutionary activity.

Due to martial law and censorship, little or no information was officially made public; a group of Socialist deputies carried out a private investigation and published an independent report that discounted most of the publicized killings but that confirmed prevalent instances of beatings and torture. The political right demanded severe punishment for the insurrection, while the political left insisted on amnesty for what they viewed as a labour strike and political protest that got out control. The government response in the aftermath of the rebellion varied in tact and strategy. The government suspended constitutional guarantees and almost all of the left's newspapers were closed, as they were owned by the parties that had promoted the uprising. Hundreds of town councils and mixed juries were suspended. Prison torture continued to be prevalent and widespread in the aftermath of the protests. There were no mass killing after the fighting was over. All death sentences were commuted aside from two: army sergeant and deserter Diego Vásquez, who fought alongside the miners, and a worker known as "El Pichilatu", who had committed serial killings. Little effort was made to suppress the organisations that had carried out the insurrection, resulting in most being functional again by 1935. Support for fascism remained minimal, while civil liberties were restored in full by 1935, after which the revolutionaries had opportunity to pursue power through electoral means. Ramón Gonzáles Peña, the leader of the Oviedo Revolutionary Committee was sentenced to death but was reprieved one year later. Gonzáles later served as the president of Unión General de Trabajadores, in which he was in conflict with Largo Caballero. He was also a Member of Parliament and was the Minister of Justice from 1938 to 1939. After the Spanish Civil War González Peña went to exile in Mexico, where he died on 27 July 1952.

Franco was convinced that the workers' uprising had been "carefully prepared by the agents of Moscow", informed by material he gathered from the Entente Anticommuniste of Geneva. Historian Paul Preston wrote: "Unmoved by the fact that the central symbol of rightist values was the reconquest of Spain from the Moors, Franco shipped Moorish mercenaries to fight in Asturias. He saw no contradiction about using the Moors, because he regarded left-wing workers with the same racialist contempt he possessed towards the tribesmen of the Rif." Franco, visiting Oviedo after the rebellion had been put down, stated; "this war is a frontier war and its fronts are socialism, communism and whatever attacks civilization in order to replace it with barbarism". The right-wing press portrayed the Asturian rebels in xenophobic and anti-Semitic terms as the tools of a foreign Jewish-Bolshevik conspiracy. Franco believed the government needed to reprimand the rebels, otherwise it would only encourage further revolutionary activity.

== Civil War ==
Historians have often regarded Asturias as the "first battle" or "prelude" of the Spanish Civil War. The left's leaders would never publicly admit to wrong-doing in the turn to mass violence in Asturias, though they would accept that they could not use such methods to obtain power in the immediate future. The suppression of the Asturias rebellion re-enforced political backing between the Republican right and the national army, a dynamic described by Calvo Sotelo as "the backbone of the Fatherland." When the Popular Front was formed in 1936, one of its proposals was to free all those who were imprisoned for taking part in the Asturias rebellion; this proposal angered the Spanish right, who regarded freeing those who had violently revolted against the legally elected government as an indicator that the Spanish left would not respect constitutional government and the rule of law.

At the outbreak of the Spanish Civil War, López Ochoa was in a military hospital in Carabanchel and was awaiting trial, accused of responsibility for the deaths of 20 civilians at a barracks in Oviedo. Given the violence occurring throughout Madrid, the government attempted to move Ochoa from the hospital to a safer location but was twice prevented from doing so by large hostile crowds. A third attempt was made under the pretence that Ochoa was already dead, but the ruse was exposed and the general was taken away. Paul Preston states that an anarchist dragged him from the coffin in which he was lying and shot him in the hospital garden. His head was hacked off, stuck on a pole and publicly paraded. His remains were then displayed with a sign reading "This is the butcher of Asturias."

The eight martyrs of Turon were venerated on 7 September 1989, and beatified by Pope John Paul II.

== See also ==
- Revolution of 1934
- Events of 6 October
- Ramón González Peña
- Révolte dans les Asturies, play by Albert Camus
- Second biennium of the Second Spanish Republic

== Bibliography ==
- Álvarez, José E. (2011). "The Spanish Foreign Legion during the Asturian Uprising of October 1934". War in History. 18 (2): 200–224. doi:10.1177/0968344510393599. ISSN 0968-3445. JSTOR 26098598. S2CID 159593285.
- Beevor, Antony (2006). The battle for Spain. The Spanish Civil War 1936-1939. London: Penguin Books Press.
- Casanova, Julián (2010). The Spanish Republic and Civil War. Cambridge University Press. p. 113. ISBN 978-1139490573.
- Cueva, Julio de La (1998). "Religious Persecution, Anticlerical Tradition and Revolution: On Atrocities against the Clergy during the Spanish Civil War". Journal of Contemporary History. 33 (3). Sage Publications, Ltd.: 355–369.
- Ealham, Chris (2005). The splintering of Spain : cultural history and the Spanish Civil War, 1936-1939. Cambridge University Press. ISBN 978-0521821780.
- Hayes, Carlton J.H. (1951). The United States and Spain. An Interpretation. Sheed & Ward; 1ST edition. ASIN B0014JCVS0.
- Hodges, Gabrielle Ashfod (2002). Franco : a concise biography (1st U.S. ed.). St. Martin's Press. ISBN 978-0312282851.
- Jackson, Gabriel (1972) [First Princeton Edition 1967]. The Spanish Republic and the Civil War,1931-1939. Princeton University Press. ISBN 0691051542.
- Jackson, Gabriel (1987). The Spanish Republic and the Civil War,1931-1939. Princeton University Press. ISBN 978-0691007571.
- Jerez-Farran, Carlos; Amago, Samuel (2010). Unearthing Franco's legacy : mass graves and the recovery of historical memory in Spain. University of Notre Dame Press. ISBN 978-0268032685.
- Graham, Helen (2005). The Spanish Civil War. A very short introduction (1st ed.). Oxford University Press. ISBN 978-0192803771.
- Orella Martínez, José Luis; Mizerska-Wrotkowska, Malgorzata (2015). Poland and Spain in the interwar and postwar period. Madrid Spain: SCHEDAS, S.l. ISBN 9788494418068.
- Payne, Stanley G. (1973). "The Spanish Civil War of 1936-1939". A History of Spain and Portugal. Vol. 2. University of Wisconsin Press – via Library of Iberian resources online.
- Payne, Stanley G (1993). Spain's first democracy : the Second Republic, 1931-1936. University of Wisconsin Press. ISBN 9780299136703.
- Payne, Stanley G. (1999). Spain's First Democracy: The Second Republic, 1931-1936. University of Wisconsin Press. ISBN 978-0299136741.
- Payne, Stanley G. (2004). The Spanish Civil War, the Soviet Union, and Communism. New Haven, CT; London, England: Yale University Press. ISBN 0-300-10068-X. OCLC 186010979.
- Payne, Stanley G. (2006). The collapse of the Spanish republic, 1933-1936: Origins of the civil war. Yale University Press. ISBN 978-0300110654.
- Payne, Stanley G.; Palacios, Jesús (2014). Franco: A Personal and Political Biography (4th ed.). University of Wisconsin Press. ISBN 978-0299302146.
- Preston, Paul (1994). "General Franco as Military Leader". Transactions of the Royal Historical Society. 4. Cambridge University Press: 21–41. doi:10.2307/3679213. ISSN 1474-0648. JSTOR 3679213. S2CID 153836234.
- Preston, Paul (2012). The Spanish Holocaust: Inquisition and Extermination in Twentieth-Century Spain (1st ed.). W. W. Norton & Company. ISBN 978-0393345919.
- Ruiz, Julius (2015). The 'Red Terror' and the Spanish Civil War: Revolutionary Violence in Madrid. Cambridge: Cambridge University Press. ISBN 978-1107682931.
- Thomas, Hugh (1977). The Spanish Civil War. Harper & Row. ISBN 978-0060142780.
- Thomas, Hugh (2001) [1961, 1987]. The Spanish Civil War. Michigan University: Modern Library. ISBN 9780375755156.
- Tusell, Javier (1992). Franco en la guerra civil - Una biografia política (in Spanish) (1st ed.). Editorial Tusquets. ISBN 9788472236486.
