= Lisardo Doval Bravo =

Spanish soldier and civil guard

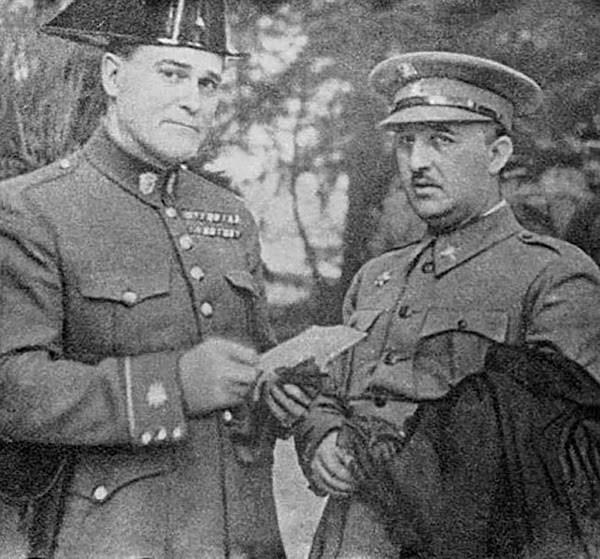
- Born: 1888; La Coruña, Spain
- Died: 15 October 1975 (aged 86–87); Madrid, Spain
- Military career
- Allegiance: Spain
- Branch: Spanish Army
- Years of service: 1926–1931
- Rank: General
- Commands: Civil Guard

Lisardo Doval Bravo (La Coruña, 1888 – Madrid, 15 October 1975) was a Spanish soldier and officer of the Spanish Civil Guard, where he became a general.

He was well known for being one of the main responsible for the repression of the Asturian Revolution of 1934, in which he used brutal methods that were denounced to the government of Alejandro Lerroux. When the Spanish Civil War broke out in 1936-1939, he joined the side of the rebels and in May 1937 he was appointed by Francisco Franco as Head of Security at the Generalist Headquarters in Salamanca.

== Career in the Civil Guard ==
He was born in a small village in the province of La Coruña in 1888. When he was a child, he met Francisco Franco, who was four years younger than him, in El Ferrol and later they met at the Infantry Academy in Toledo. He joined the Civil Guard as an officer and served in Oviedo from 1917 to 1922. During the dictatorship of Primo de Rivera, he was nominated as a captain and was appointed as head of the garrison in Gijón, where he stayed from 1926 to 1931.

During this period he stood out for the harshness with which he repressed strikes and demonstrations by the Republican and workers' left. During General Berenguer's "Dictablanda" he led the repression in Gijón of the general strike called for December 15, 1930 by the Republican-Socialist "revolutionary committee" that emerged from the San Sebastián Pact. That day a worker was killed and another wounded as a result of shots fired from a Jesuit building. Captain Doval ordered a cavalry charge against the workers and later authorized the beating of the strikers to denounce their leaders. In April 1931 he resorted to the use of machine guns to repel an attack on his barracks.

The new Republican Town Hall of Gijón, constituted after the municipal elections of 12 April 1931, tried to start a process of purging the responsibilities for the actions carried out by Captain Doval and the Civil Guards under his orders. When Doval found out about the City Council's intentions, he wrote a long exculpatory letter that was published in the newspapers El Comercio and La Prensa. The following day, several letters appeared in the newspaper El Noroeste to the director of lawyers and people detained by Doval, in which they denounced the torture and ill-treatment they had been subjected to or had become aware of.

He participated in General Sanjurjo's failed coup d'état of August 1932, for which he was suspended, but benefited from the amnesty granted by the radical government of Alejandro Lerroux, supported by the CEDA of José María Gil Robles, on 24 April 1934.1 He was chosen by Gil Robles to train the paramilitary squads of the Juventudes de Acción Popular (JAP), the youth branch of the CEDA. On 19 September 1934 he was assigned to Tetuán.

== Spanish Civil War ==
When the coup d'état took place in July 1936, Major Doval led a column from Salamanca that advanced on Ávila to occupy the villages near the mountains and enter Madrid, but his column was dissolved when it was defeated by the loyal forces coming from Madrid under the command of Lieutenant Colonel Julio Mangada. In those operations also participated the leader of the Spanish Falange, Onésimo Redondo, who led the Falangist militias. Redondo died on 24 July in the Segovia town of Labajos. When the news reached the Falangist militias composed of Onésimo Redondo's followers ready to avenge his death, supported by a military unit under the command of commander Doval, he went to Salamanca where he carried out the repression of the leftists who had already been arrested. Many of them were taken out of their cells by the Falangists and executed. Among them were the city's mayor, Casto Prieto Carrasco, professor of radiology at the Faculty of Medicine of the University of Salamanca, and the socialist deputy José Andrés Manso.

On May 14, 1937, he was appointed by Franco as Head of Security of the residence and headquarters of the Generalissimo in Salamanca, taking command of "the European and Moroccan forces in charge of the H.E. guard".

Once the civil war was over, he presided over the war councils against the defeated in Tortosa. In two trials held on 10 August 1939, involving 14 and 15 men respectively, the defendants were only able to speak to the military man appointed as defence counsel on the day of the trial, and the whole process did not last half an hour.

Around 1953 he retired with the rank of general of the Guardia Civil. He died 22 years later at the age of 87 at the Gomez Ulla Military Hospital in Madrid on October 15, 1975, one month before the death of Franco.
