= Belarmino Tomás =

Spanish socialist politician

- Born: Belarmino Tomás Álvarez; 29 April 1892; Tueya, La Llavandera, Gijón, Spain
- Died: 14 September 1950 (aged 58); Mexico
- Occupation: Politician

Belarmino Tomás Álvarez (29 April 1892 – 14 September 1950) was a socialist politician.

A secretary of the Sindicato Minero Asturiano (the local coal miners' branch of the Unión General de Trabajadores, UGT), and a delegate to the International Miners' Federation. As a prominent labor organizer, Tomás led militias formed by workers during the "Revolution of Asturias" of October 1934, being the president of the new revolutionary state (5-15 of October). He was a revolutionary not just to face only the right-wing government, but also the Second Spanish Republic. He subsequently took part in the elections of 1936 as a candidate for the Popular Front, being elected a deputy with the election victory the Front carried.

When the Spanish Civil War erupted, Belarmino Tomás led the miners' militias attacking Oviedo (held by Antonio Aranda's forces). He was voted President of the Consejo Soberano de Asturias y León upon its creation on August 24, 1937. In Gijón on October 20, the day the city was taken by Galician rebel forces, Tomás left for the Republican zone and begun Comisario General del Aire (general comisaire of the airforce), exiling himself when the Popular Front was defeated in early 1939. He was also popular because of the belarminos, the money that was used in his declared state during his presidency.
