= Eduardo López Ochoa =

Spanish general (1877–1936)

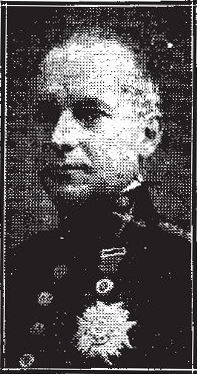
- López Ochoa in 1930
- Born: Eduardo López Ochoa y Portoundo; 31 January 1877; Barcelona, Kingdom of Spain
- Died: 19 August 1936 (aged 59); Madrid, Spanish Republic
- Military career
- Allegiance: Kingdom of Spain; Spanish Republic
- Rank: Captain general
- Conflicts: Asturian Revolution of 1934

Eduardo López Ochoa y Portoundo (31 January 1877 – 19 August 1936) was a Spanish general, Africanist, and prominent Freemason. He was known for most of his life as a traditional Republican, and conspired against the government of Miguel Primo de Rivera.

== Biography ==
Due to his Republican sympathies and opposition Miguel Primo de Rivera, Lopez Ochoa was a conspirator in the 1926 Spanish coup attempt. At the proclamation of the Second Spanish Republic in 1931, López Ochoa was designated capitán general of Catalonia by Francesc Macià. He led troops to crush the insurrection in Asturias in October 1934, after which the leader of the nascent Popular Front was jailed. The left felt betrayed, and began to regard López Ochoa as a rightist. His left-wing enemies nicknamed him "el verdugo de Asturias" ("the butcher of Asturias"). At the same time, those on the right distrusted him for his Freemasonry, for having entered negotiations with the Asturian miners, and for punishing soldiers guilty of violent excesses. As a deterrent to further atrocities, López Ochoa had ordered the summary executions of six legionnaires and Moroccan colonial troops for raping, torturing, and murdering prisoners, some of whom had been hacked to death.

At the outbreak of the Spanish Civil War, López Ochoa was in a military hospital in Carabanchel and was awaiting trial, accused of responsibility for the deaths of 20 civilians at a barracks in Oviedo. Given the violence occurring throughout Madrid, the government attempted to move Ochoa from the hospital to a safer location but was twice prevented from doing so by large hostile crowds. A third attempt was made under the guise that Ochoa was already dead, but the ruse was exposed and the general was taken away. One account states that an anarchist dragged him from the coffin in which he was lying and shot him in the hospital garden. His head was severed and displayed with a sign reading "This is the butcher of Asturias."

== See also ==
- 1926 Spanish coup d'état

== Bibliography ==
- Gipuzkoa 1936
