= Diego Hidalgo y Durán =

Spanish intellectual and politician

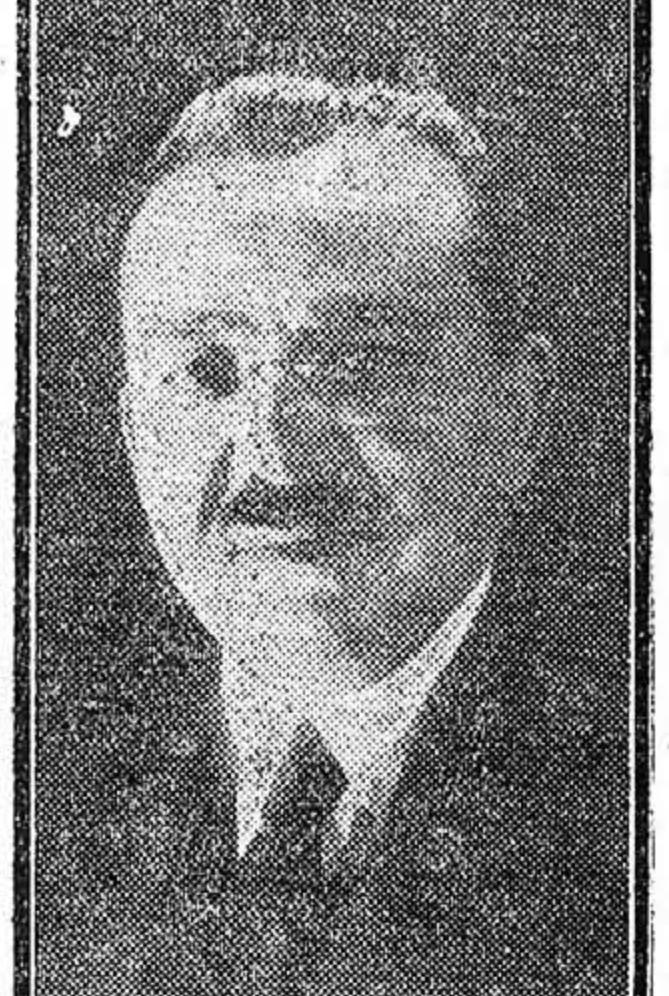

Minister of War of Spain
- In office 23 January – 16 November 1934
- President: Niceto Alcalá-Zamora
- Prime Minister: Alejandro Lerroux; Ricardo Samper; Alejandro Lerroux
- Preceded by: Diego Martínez Barrio
- Succeeded by: Alejandro Lerroux

Personal details
- Born: 13 February 1886 Los Santos de Maimona, Spain
- Died: 31 January 1961 (aged 74) Madrid, Spain
- Other political affiliations: Radical Republican Party
- Spouse: Gerda Schnur de Hidalgo
- Children: Diego Hidalgo Schnur

Diego Hidalgo y Durán (1886–1961) was a Spanish intellectual and politician, who was appointed minister of war during the Second Spanish Republic (1931–1936).

== Biography ==
Born in Los Santos de Maimona (Extremadura) in a family of aristocratic descent, Diego Hidalgo had to make a living early as his family had no lands and his father died when he was young. After studying law, he passed the state exam to become a notary, and started supporting his mother and four siblings.

Hidalgo was a Republican (even though he had rights to two titles of Marquis, given up by his grandfather, Diego Hidalgo y Solís). One of the drafters of the Constitutions of the Second Spanish Republic in 1931, and a member of the Radical Republican Party presided by Alejandro Lerroux, Hidalgo became Minister of War in 1934. When serving as Minister, Hidalgo chose Francisco Franco (who was later going to be lead nationalist Spain during the civil war and be the caudillo for nearly 40 years) as one of his advisers. Hidalgo ordered Franco to stop the asturian miners' strike of 1934. Although Franco would later reveal to be ideologically different from Hidalgo, he kept affection for him, and Hidalgo was one of the only people who could speak freely with Franco.

During the Spanish Civil War (1936–1939), Diego Hidalgo had to flee from Spain, where he was threatened both by Nationalists and Republicans. He spent most of the war in France where he married Gerda Schnur, the daughter of German industrialist David Schnur.

Back in Spain in 1938, Hidalgo continued his activities as a lawyer, notary, and writer. Notably, he saved 39 Republican political prisoners from being executed, proving their innocence. Hidalgo was also a member of the International Court of Justice.

Diego Hidalgo y Durán was the father of the Spanish intellectual and philanthropist Diego Hidalgo Schnur.

== Major writings by Diego Hidalgo y Durán ==
- Un notario español en Rusia, 1929.
- ¿Por qué fui lanzado del ministerio de la guerra?: diez meses de actuación ministerial, 1934.
- Nueva York: impresiones de un español del siglo XIX que no sabe inglés, 1947.
- José Antonio de Saravia: de estudiante extremeño a general de los ejércitos del Zar, 1936.
