= Republican repression in Madrid (1936–1939) =

Reprisals against perceived enemies of the Second Spanish Republic in the capital

The republican repression in Madrid (1936–1939) was a series of measures applied against presumed enemies of the Second Spanish Republic. Repressive actions were organised by state services, party militias and hybrid structures. Some activities were carried out as part of legal procedures and might have involved various judiciary, but others remained on the verge of legal framework or clearly beyond it. Legally sanctioned repressive actions included execution, expropriations, fines, dismissal, jail, relocation, forced labour or loss of civil rights. Extrajudicial violence included execution, rape, mutilation, torture, humiliation, incarceration, destruction or takeover of property. The climax of repressions took place in 1936, but they continued during the following years. Their total scale remains unclear; fragmentary figures indicate that one institution detained at least 18,000 people in 1936. The number of the executed is disputed; two personal lists produced contain around 9,000 and around 11,500 names. Historians do not agree on most issues related to the Spanish Civil War repressions, including the ones of Madrid in 1936-1939.

== Organization framework ==
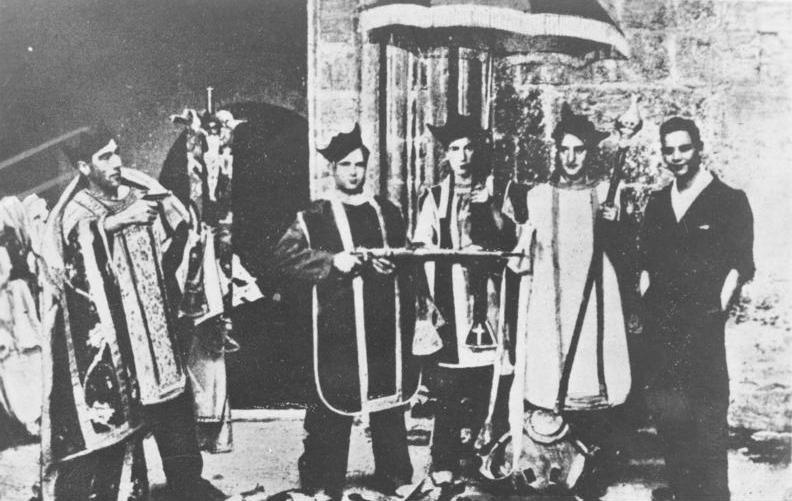
Republican militia, Madrid 1936

At the outbreak of the Spanish Civil War there were three policing formations operational in Madrid, all reporting to Minister of Interior: Guardia Civil, Guardia de Asalto and the police. Guardia Civil was initially targeted for major purge and reform, but in late August 1936 it was declared to be dissolved and replaced by a new service, Guardia Nacional Republicana (GNR). Recruitment to GNR commenced soon, yet the Guard did not play major role in implementation of repressive measures; starting late 1936 it was already marked for merger into a new general public order formation. Guardia de Asalto continued to operate, yet its Madrid units were deployed on the front against the rebels and were scarcely involved in the city. The police, and especially its investigative branch Cuerpo de Investigación y Vigilancia (CIV), from the onset underwent major change. Supervised by Dirección General de Seguridad (DGS), a security office within the Ministry of Interior, the change consisted of massive purges on one hand and massive new recruitment on the other. Staffed with new militant members coming from revolutionary parties, some CIV units like Brigada Atadell, Brigada de Amanacer or Los Linces de la República became instrumental in implementing the Republican order.

Outbreak of hostilities and especially the decision to hand weapons to civilians, mostly party and trade union members, produced rapid emergence of armed militias, usually though not always affiliated to political organizations. During first months of the war they by far eclipsed state formations in terms of shaping the public order ambience in Madrid, yet due to their makeshift organization, ephemeral nature and improvised modus operandi this vast force evades systematic structural description. These groups are best known because of detention and interrogation posts operated, commonly known as checas; their number is currently calculated at around 350, some 4 per every square kilometer and one per every 3,000 people; the majority disappeared by early 1937. Though there are rare accounts of conflict between militias and official public order units, in general the latter avoided challenging the former. Both developed sort of operational symbiosis, e.g. militias used official police records to identify and locate suspects, at times handed over detainees to DGS or – far more frequently – took them over from prisons, arrests or police stations. It is suspected that on exception basis frontline military units might have also participated in action against presumed anti-Republican conspiracy.

In August 1936 the DGS in agreement with major parties decided to set up a new body, Comité Provincial de Investigación Pública (CPIP). A paid policing service managed by a board consisting of party delegates, CPIP was to thwart anti-Republican plots and to arrest individuals involved. In theory they were to be passed to DGS for further investigation; in practice CPIP's internal filtering body, set up to process detainees, was entitled to administer executions. During some 100 days of its existence CPIP was the key law-enforcement agency before a dissolution decree was issued early November 1936, though few units continued to operate some time afterwards. Another new body, by far less important, was Inspección General de Milicias (IGM). Created also in August 1936 it was an army branch, supposed to co-ordinate logistics and financing of party militias, though it operated also its own Sección de Investigación; IGM was dissolved in November 1936. In September 1936 Ministry of Interior set up its own unit designed to co-ordinate militia activities, Milicias de Vigilancia de la Retaguardia (MVR), a hybrid between state policing force and party militias; initially scarcely active, later MVR recruited men from dissolved CPIP and gained momentum; some of its sections became very active before MVR, including the militia units still operational, was dissolved in December 1936.

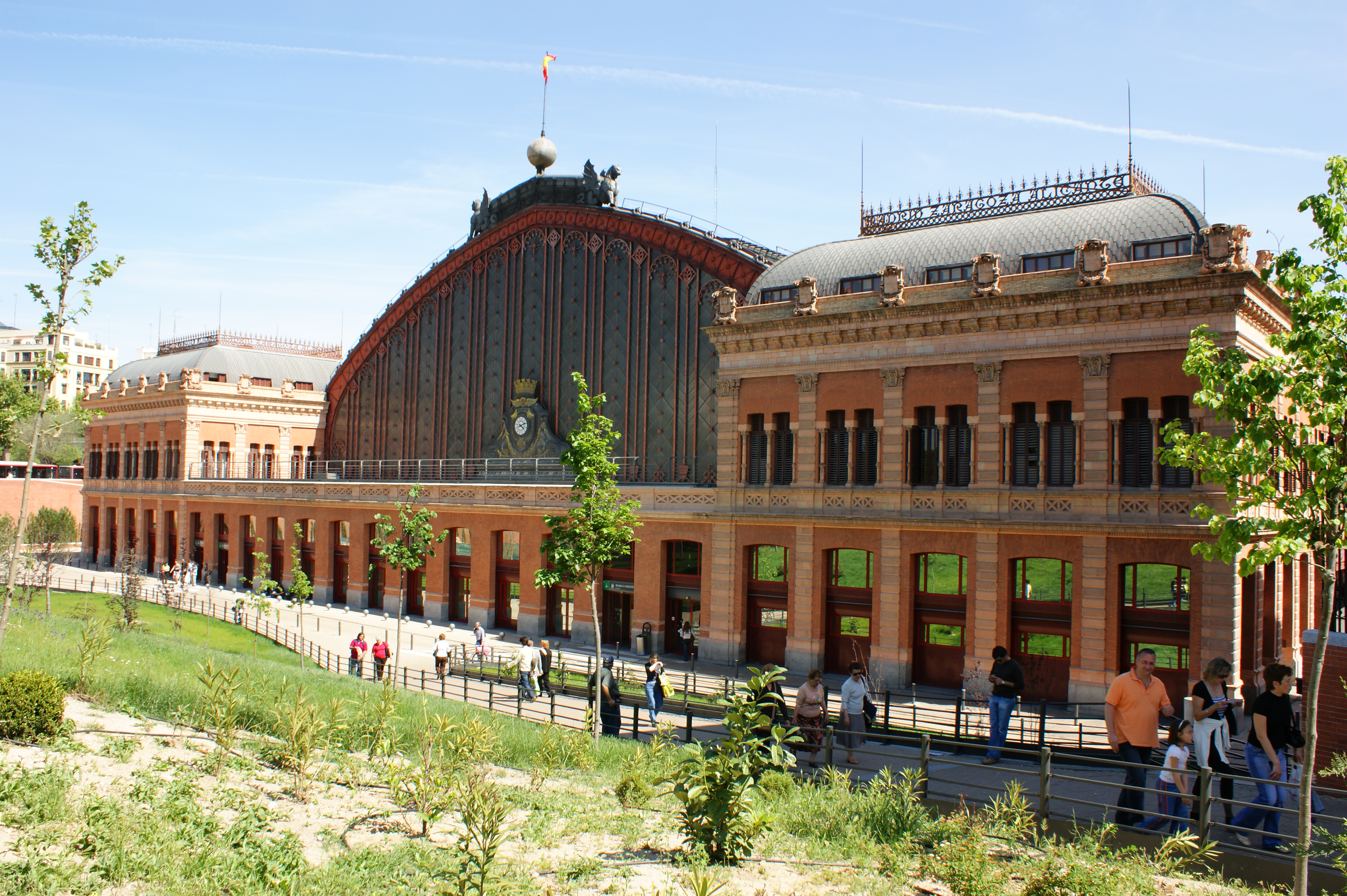
Atocha, former detention site (present view)

In December 1936 it was made public that all policing formations - Guardia de Asalto, GNR, CIV, MVR, IGM – would merge in a new service, Cuerpo de Seguridad (CS). Of its two branches, Grupo Uniformado and Grupo Civil, the latter included Sección de Investigaciones Especiales; this plain clothes investigation service became the backbone of policing structures managed by the Ministry of Interior. However, the same minister in June 1937 carved out from DGS a unit named Departamento Especial de Información de Estado (DEDIDE), basically a counter-intelligence agency, which also in Madrid ran its own network of operatives and premises. Two months later, in August 1937, the Ministry of War declared setting up a new organization, supposed to gather all espionage, counter-espionage and information activities: Servicio de Investigación Militar (SIM). From that moment onwards SIM became the key state instrument in fighting presumed conspiracy. In March 1938 it incorporated the dissolved DEDIDE. The army intelligence units like Section Two of the General Staff, later known as Servicio de Información del Estado Mayor (SIEM), continued to operate independently, yet except late 1936/early 1937, when military counter-espionage Special Services remained fairly active, they did not contribute to public order system in Madrid.

== Modus operandi ==
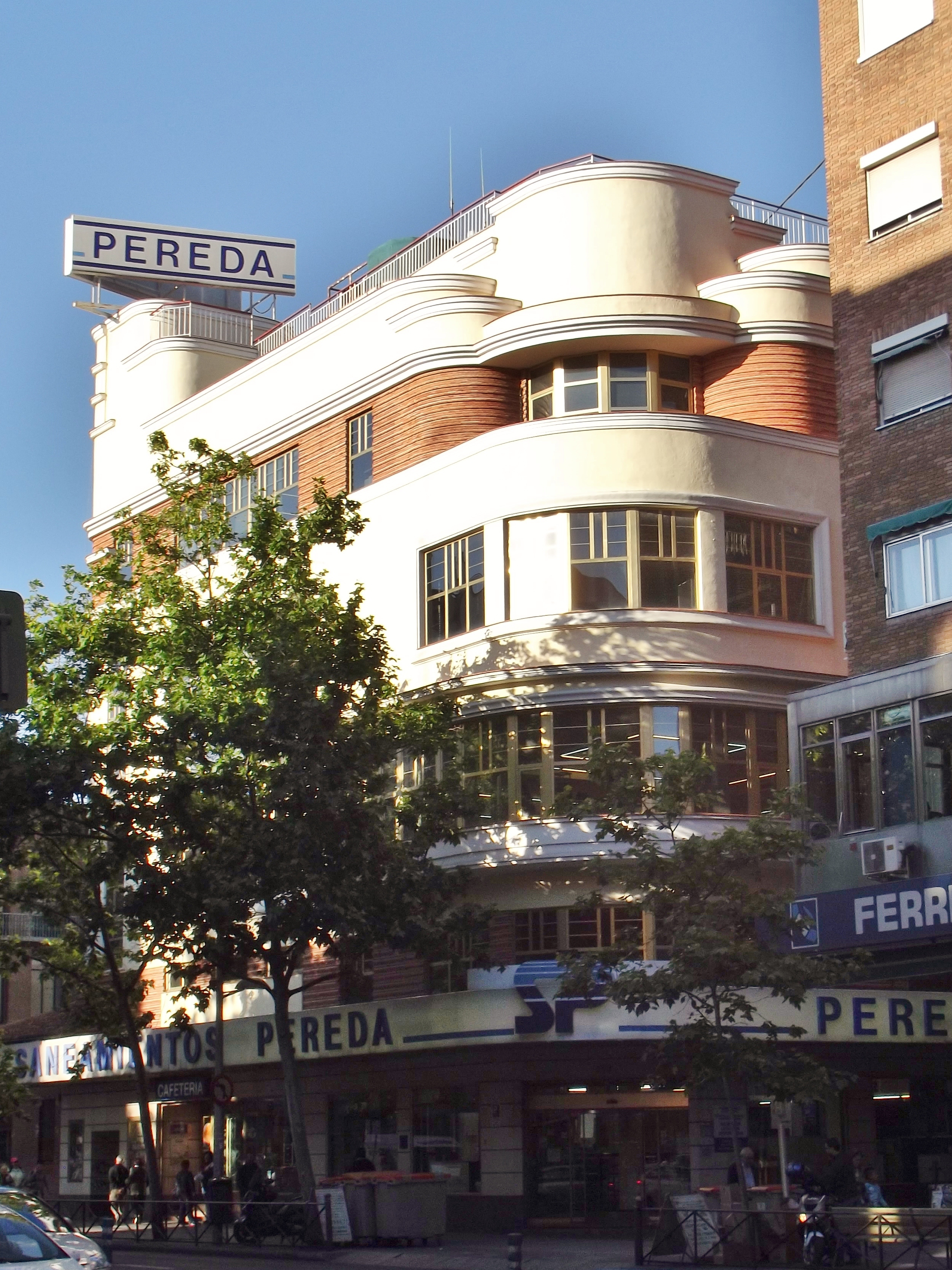
Cine Europa, former CNT detention centre (present view)

Units forming the Republican realm of public order relied on various methods in their pursuit of suspects. The most popular one was response to tips and denunciations, either from individuals co-operating with the security, most prominently porters of the UGT union of porters, or madrileños who were not related to the policing network. Another method was the systematic search, usually based on files held by prewar offices like police departments, or papers obtained from raiding premises of right-wing parties or institutions. One more method was street vigilance and monitoring, related to key objects or the black market. Finally, certain units specialized in setting up traps, like the false embassy of Siam or the so-called Túnel de Usera.

Some individuals were apprehended and executed on the spot or shortly afterwards, at times maltreated before death. Many of them, however, ended up in some sort of incarceration; it might have been in official prison compounds, in arrests on police stations or in detention centers operated by various groups, usually in former convents or other suitable large buildings. It seems that incarceration usually lasted no longer than few months, but there were cases of much longer detention. An interrogation followed; depending upon the results of questioning, the detainees might have been set free, transferred to another detention unit, e.g. from CPIP to DGS, left in custody, marked to stand before a tribunal or selected for execution. There is no reliable statistics available; according to members of CPIP filtering commission interrogated by their Nationalist captors after 1939, some 50% of captives were freed, some 25% were marked for further incarceration and some 25% were executed.

Suspects supposed to stand trial might have faced different types of judicial or quasi-judicial bodies. Regular system of district courts continued to operate, but it could not cope with the scale of detentions. In August 1936, the government set up Tribunal Especial dedicated exclusively to dealing with crimes of "rebellion and sedition"; in September 1936 it was aided by a new type of judicial body, Tribunal Popular de Responsabilidades Civiles, and in October of the same year by Jurados de Urgencia and Jurados de Guardia, both abolished in March 1938; it was not the case of Tribunal Especial de Espionaje y Alta Traición, set up in June 1937. Most of these tribunals had a mixed composition of professional judges/lawyers and non-professional jury members recruited from the public; they admitted, at least in theory, various degree of defense or self-defense, but there was no appeal. The tribunals were created to dispense fast and smooth justice but failed to do so; e.g. there were only 389 defendants who appeared before the Madrid Tribunal Especial in 1936. There is only partial statistics of verdicts adopted; it seems that around 50% of defendants were absolved and that some 8% were sentenced to capital punishment. Perhaps the best known case of Madrid execution following trial and death sentence is this of Joaquín Fanjul. Executions might have taken place during or shortly after the apprehension, during incarceration in prison/detention centre or at one of execution sites, the latter following less or more formal administrative/juridical decision or resulting from action unsanctioned even by a dubious procedure.

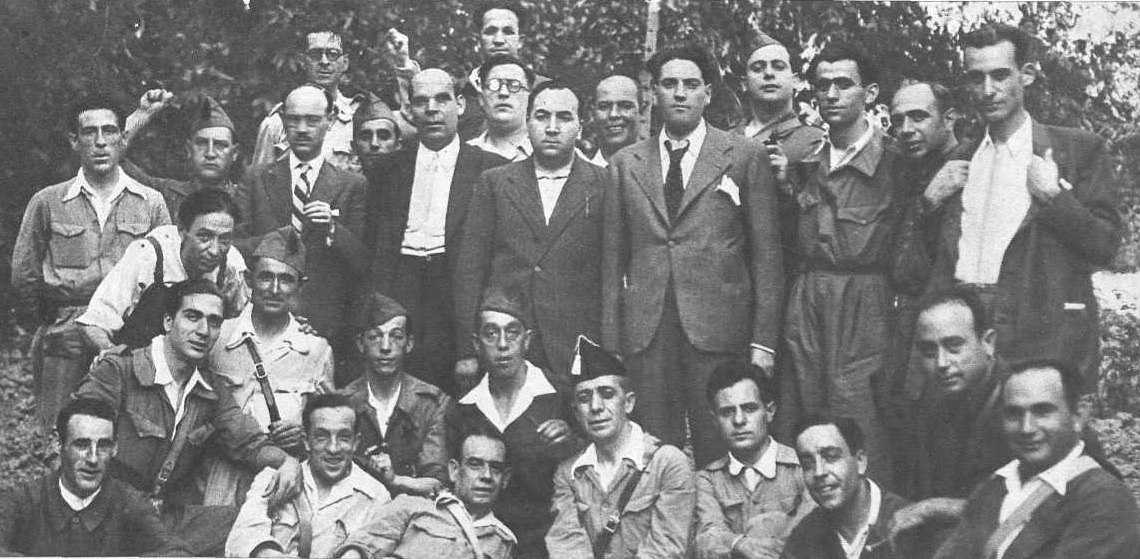
CIV unit

There is no systematic data allowing quantitative estimates, but it is believed that the number of on-the-spot executions was highest during initial months of the war and decreased rapidly afterwards. The best-known form of killings were so-called paseos and sacas. The former usually stands for small-scale unofficial executions, while the latter typically denotes larger extractions of inmates from detention sites, often substantiated by some form of formal decision. In both cases, inmates were shot in sparsely populated quarters, typically in parks or near cemeteries. Corpses were then dumped at the nearest cemetery or left to be collected by municipal services later, but in the largest case of Paracuellos de Jarama, they were buried in shallow common graves. In late 1937, inmates were increasingly directed to labour camps, typically operated by SIM. They were not comparable to later Nazi death camps, but some inmates perished in atrocious conditions; in the Madrid Province such a camp was located in Ambite.

== Victims ==
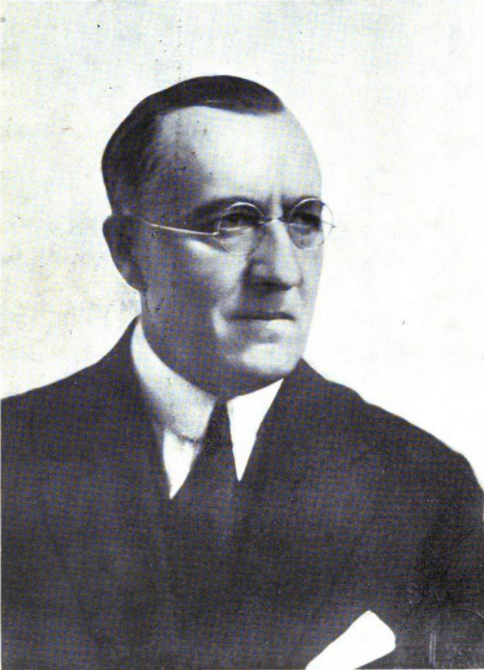
Ramiro Maeztu

All estimates of casualties focus on the executed but do not provide figures related to other categories of the repressed, be it those related to legal proceedings – expropriated, fined, dismissed, jailed, relocated, condemned to forced labor, stripped of civil rights – or those related to extrajudicial violence, like those raped, mutilated, beaten, tortured, humiliated, detained or those who found their property vandalized, stolen, burnt or otherwise destroyed. One study suggests that the number of CPIP detainees only might have been 18,000. Initially the number of executed was counted in tens of thousands, e.g. in early 1937 The Guardian coined the figure of 40,000. The Francoist Dictamen, released in 1939, opted for 60,000, though confidentially the numbers were soon reduced to 18,000. Until the end of Francoism it was impossible to verify these claims; archival research of the late 20th century produced two lists of identified victims, one totaling 8,815 and one 11,756. Both lists have been proven to be defective; on one hand, they contain duplicated names, and on the other, there are individuals known to have been arrested and never re-appearing, but missing among the names. Most scholars tend to prefer the 8,815 figure as a general approximation, though few authors claim that given only identified victims are listed, the overall death toll in the province was around 15,000. Even the lowest estimate of 8,815 places Madrid among provinces with the highest relative repression level in the loyalist area; in absolute terms there is no question that Madrid "witnessed the most killings in the Republican zone".

There is no systematic documentation on the repressed which would allow any reasonable social profiling. Existing sets of more thorough data refer to specific processes and it is not clear how representative they are; this is e.g. the case of files produced by popular tribunals. Some scholars tend to accept them as indicative of general social composition of all the repressed, though e.g. in case of sex there are significant discrepancies noted. According to the tribunal files most of the defendants were empleados, a wide and ambiguous category generally pointing to white-collar hired employees; among other top categories housewives form 14%, military 12% and students 8%; industry workers make up 6%. In terms of age the prevailing category are these between 26 and 30 (17%), 52% of the defendants were singles and 41% were married. In terms of their political preferences the overwhelming majority belonged to two parties, Acción Popular (40%) and Falange (38%). According to claims based on oral accounts there were two social groups which stood out as key targets of repression: the military and the religious, both approached as uniformed arms and propaganda departments of the same enemy. These claims are not substantiated by the tribunal data, which indicates that 57% of the military defendants were acquitted; in case of the religious the figure was 75%. Relatively high percentage of acquittals suggests that the tribunals made some effort to investigate the cases and did not default to death sentences. It also suggests that at least 50% of individuals detained and later appearing in court were not engaged in any conspiracy. How many detainees executed before facing trial were engaged in anti-Republican activities is impossible to tell, especially that the term was applied very flexibly. Membership in foreign diplomatic corps did not save from arrest or execution.

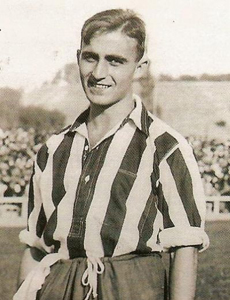
"Monchín" Triana

Many nationally known personalities fell victim to the Madrid repression. Perhaps the one who enjoyed some sort of celebrity status was the writer Ramiro Maeztu Whitney; other writers and artists executed were Pedro Muñoz Seca, Manuel Ciges Aparicio, Francisco Vega Ceide and Álvaro Alcalá Galiano. However, the death toll was particularly heavy among politicians, including Melquíades Álvarez Gónzalez-Posada, José María Albiñana Sanz, Manuel Rico Avello, Ramón Álvarez-Valdés, Federico Salmón Amorín, Tomás Salort Olives, Rafael Esparza García, Francisco Javier Jiménez de la Puente, Ramiro Ledesma Ramos, Rafael Salazar Alonso, Antonio Bermúdez Cañete and Andrés Nin Pérez . Of the military executed the highest ranked or otherwise known were Pío López Pozas, José Rodríguez Casademunt, Rafael Villegas Montesinos, Osvaldo Capaz Montes, Joaquín Fanjul Goñi, Eduardo López Ochoa, Mateo García de los Reyes, Julio Ruiz de Alda and Luis Barceló Jover. High officials who lost their lives were Santiago Martín Báguenas and José Martinez de Velasco, the list of scholars includes Rufino Blanco Sánchez and Álvaro López Núñez. The outstanding religious killed were Zacarias García Villada, Emilio Ruiz Muñoz, Pedro Poveda Castroverde and Ignacio Casanovas Camprubí. Also sport personalities might have been subject to repression, as demonstrated by cases of Ricardo Zamora Martínez (who escaped death), Ramon Triana Arroyo and Hernando Fitz-James Stuart.

== Time and geography ==
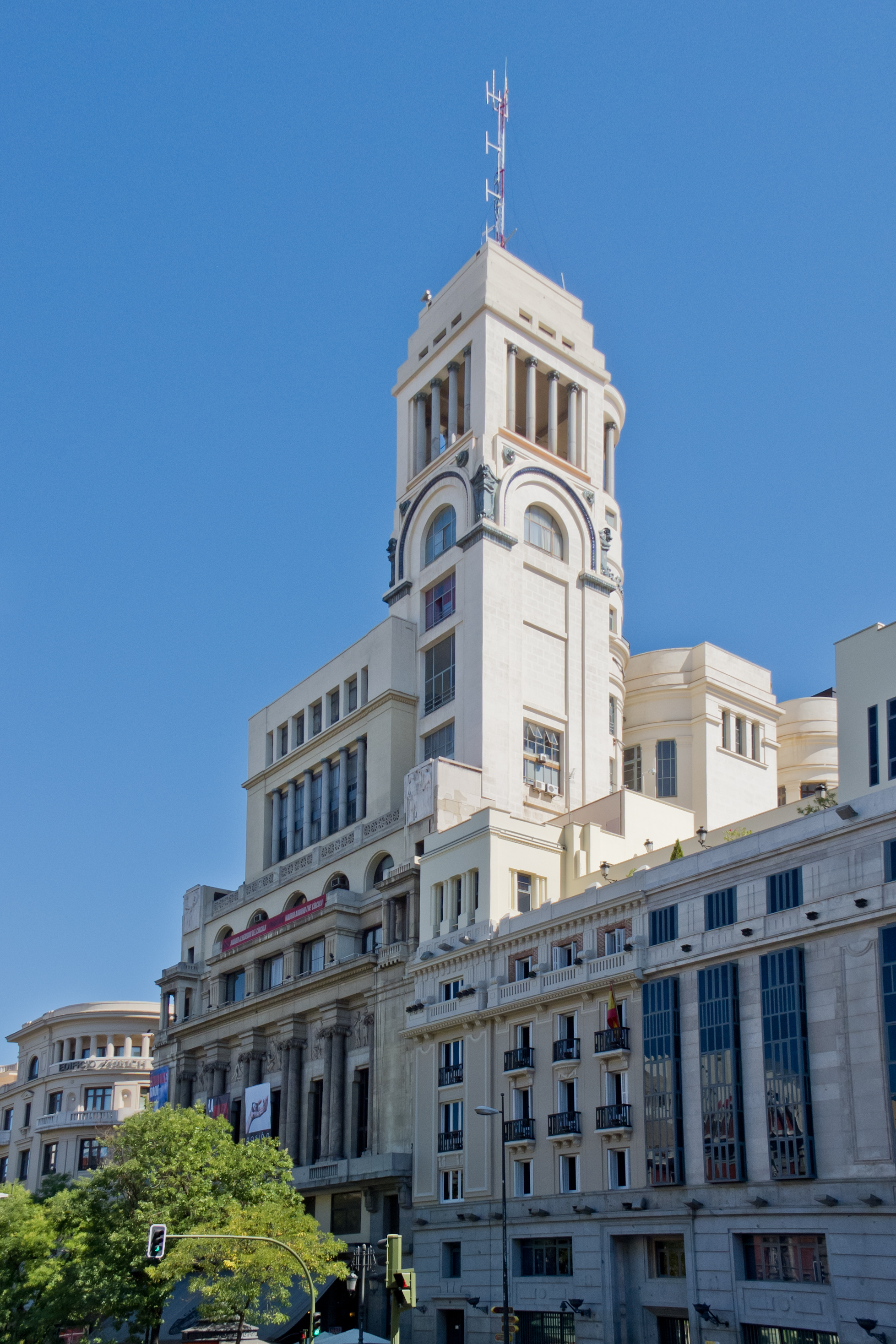
Checa de Bellas Artes

There is no study that suggests even approximate quantitative estimates of the scale of Madrid repression year by year. However, almost all studies suggest that most violence took place in 1936. One historian claims that 96% of executions took place in 1936; some challenge or reject the methodology altogether, others tend to accept the figures. An analysis of paseos only, the study based on files stored in the Madrid Audiencia Territorial, indicates that 97,6% of these killings took place before 1937, though documentation stored might also reflect changing procedural and filing patterns within the security forces. Detailed analysis of existing evidence of small-scale executions suggests that they climaxed in July (400), August (650) and September (550), with smaller figures for October and November (around 300 each) and still lower in December (below 100). However, it should by no means be assumed that the overall number of victims decreased throughout 1936; the Paracuellos executions, carried out in late November and early December, took the toll of at least 2,000 victims with few estimates pointing to around 4,000. There is no doubt that the scale of the killings was much smaller throughout 1937, 1938 and 1939, especially that since the spring of 1937 the Minister of Justice Garcia Olivier strove to set up a wide network of forced labor camps and advanced the thesis that rather than be punished by death for their crimes, the enemies of the Republic should redeem their deeds by hard work. However, also after then executions continued and at times climaxed in large-scale waves of killings; in November 1937 at least 67 individuals were executed in a scam known as Túnel de Usera, while in March 1939 SIM cracked down on unspecified number of Communists, with many of them killed.

Geographical analysis of repression system in the Republican Madrid does not demonstrate any specific pattern as to location of Madrid detention centers. With 4 checas per square kilometer on average, they were covering the city with dense and rather regular network; even at that time suburban borough of Puente de Vallecas hosted 17 such places. Among 5 checas with the largest number of victims recorded, Checa San Bernardo, Checa Lista and Checa Santa Engracia were located in the very centre, while Checa del Ateneo and Checa del Circulo somewhat more outside. Headquarters of CPIP, perhaps the most prominent institution of Republican repression system, was centrally located first at Calle de Alcala and then at Calle de Fomento; premises of DGS and its agendas were scattered around the Salamanca district, usually at or near Calle de Serrano. Until mid-1937 most detentions were carried out in the districts of Chamberi and Buenavista; later these areas ceased to stand out.

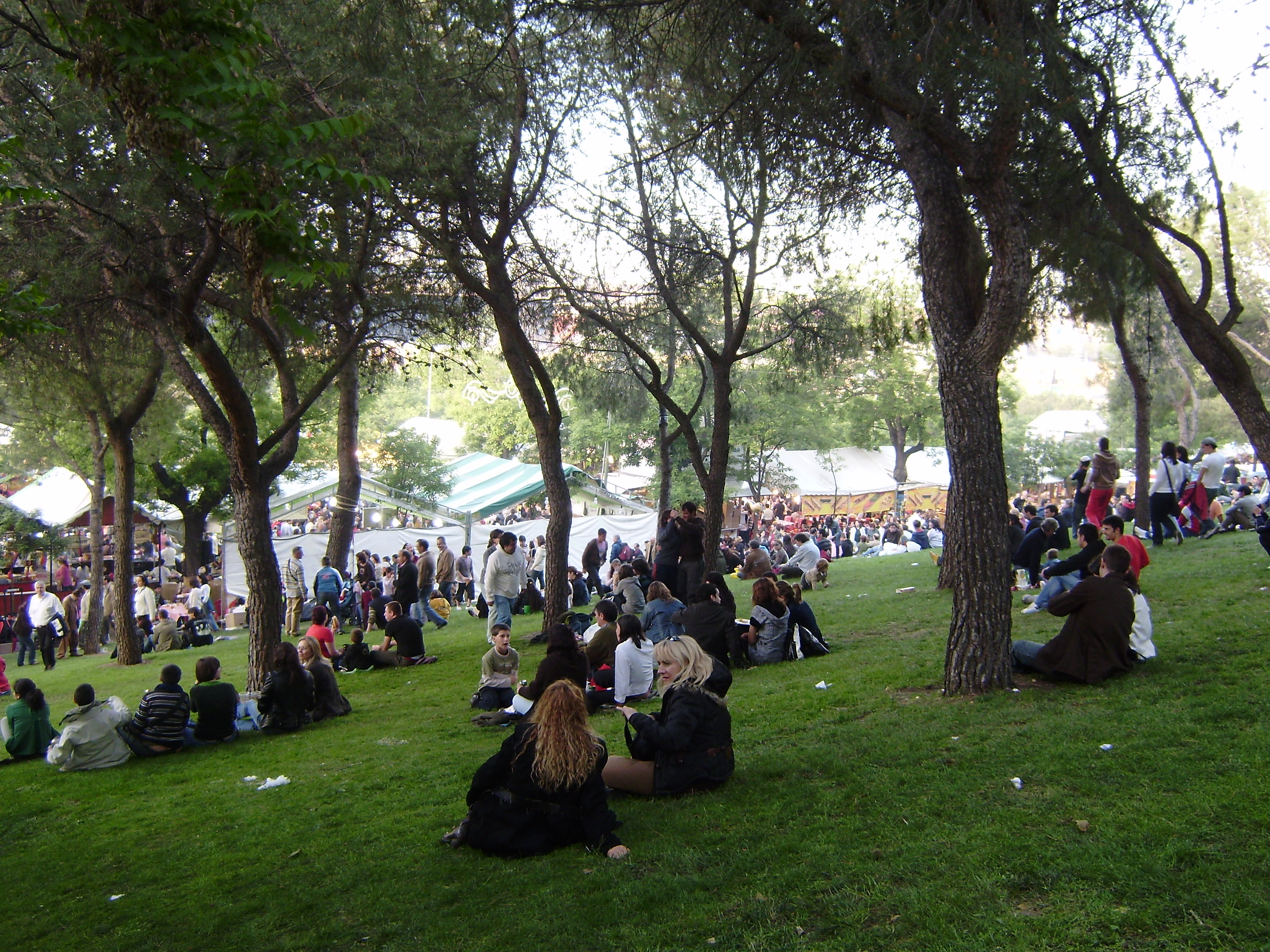
Pradera de San Isidro today

Geographical location of execution sites changed over time. During the first months of the conflict the inmates were taken usually to the Western districts of Madrid or to its Western suburbs, especially to Aravaca in the North, large green areas of Casa de Campo in the centre and to the park known as Pradera de San Isidro in the South. It is supposed that these sparsely populated and partially rural areas were deemed more suitable for executions than more densely inhabited Eastern and Northern peripheries of the capital. However, as the Nationalist troops approached from the West, Aravaca or Casa del Campo found themselves dangerously close to the frontline and soon became the battlefield themselves, which prompted re-orientation of executions. Since October they were taking place in the East and in the South, especially in Rivas-Vaciamadrid, along Carretera de Andalusia and near Cimiterio del Este. Paracuellos de Jarama was chosen as site of the largest executions because it remained away from the frontline, because there was an easy road access from Madrid, and because local ayuntamientos were considered politically reliable, ready to organize the locals for work related to burying the bodies.

== Protagonists ==
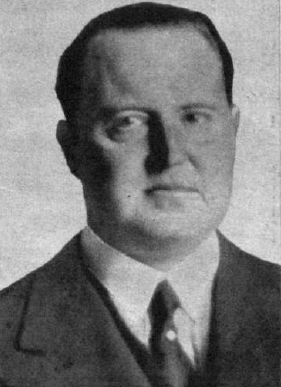
Ángel Galarza

During the first few weeks of the war the person responsible for public order in Republican Spain was Sebastián Pozas Perea, the Minister of Interior; scarcely involved in local Madrid issues, he nevertheless demonstrated complacency towards the revolutionary groupings. His second in command, the DGSG head José Alonso Mallol, tried to preserve integrity of state structures yet overwhelmed by events, he resigned on July 31, 1936. His replacement was Manuel Muñoz Martínez, who since early September reported already to the new minister, Angel Galarza Gago. The two remained key public order officials in Madrid until early November 1936, when they left the capital. From this moment onwards both Galarza and Muñoz, but also their successors at ministry and DGS retained less influence over state public order structures in Madrid. Their role was about initiating and overseeing some structural changes, yet implementation and local public order policy remained largely in hands of Junta de Defensa de Madrid (JDM) and later other local bodies.

JDM was set up in early November 1936; its branch responsible for public order, Consejeria de Orden Público, was assumed by Santiago Carrillo Solares and his deputy José Cazorla Mauré. When a month later Carrillo left Madrid, it was Cazorla who became the most potent man in security forces of the capital, the post held almost until the dissolution of JDM in April 1937. For a few months various individuals competed for power, like e.g. David Vázquez Baldominos, Cazorla's nominee as inspector general of Madrid police. In the summer of 1937 Gustavo Durán Martínez was appointed head of the Madrid SIM. His tenure lasted few months; in October 1937 he was replaced by Ángel Pedrero García, former deputy head of the Atadell Brigade and a personal Prieto's trustee. Pedrero was the most important man in Madrid policing structures for 17 months; during the Casado coup in March 1939 he greatly assisted the rebels by leading SIM to arrest a number of Communist personalities in Madrid. He left the capital in late March; at that time the key man behind forces of order was Vicente Girauta Liñares, since mid-1938 Comisario General de Seguridad in the province.

Some individuals rather briefly commanded important public order structures. This was the case of Segundo Serrano Poncela; he headed the DGS Security Council only few weeks, just in time to issue orders to extract prisoners who ended up at Paracuellos. Federico Manzano Govantes first directed MVR and effectively managed the militias manning the Paracuellos extractions; later he moved to SIM. Ramón Rascón Ramírez headed CPIP personal section, sat in DGS council and led its prison department, headed commissions selecting inmates for Paracuellos and left for the front in 1937. Manuel Salgado Moreira vigorously commanded military counter-intelligence at the turn of 1936 and 1937 and organized some spectacular scams, like the false Siam embassy. Julio de Mora Martinez since 1938 supervised the SIM labor camp structure in the province. Benigno Mancebo Martín served as secretary of CPIP and then was member of provincial board which reconstructed new security forces, apart from leading a unit himself. Melchor Rodríguez García was briefly Delegado General de Prisiones and with limited success tried to stop the Paracuellos extractions.

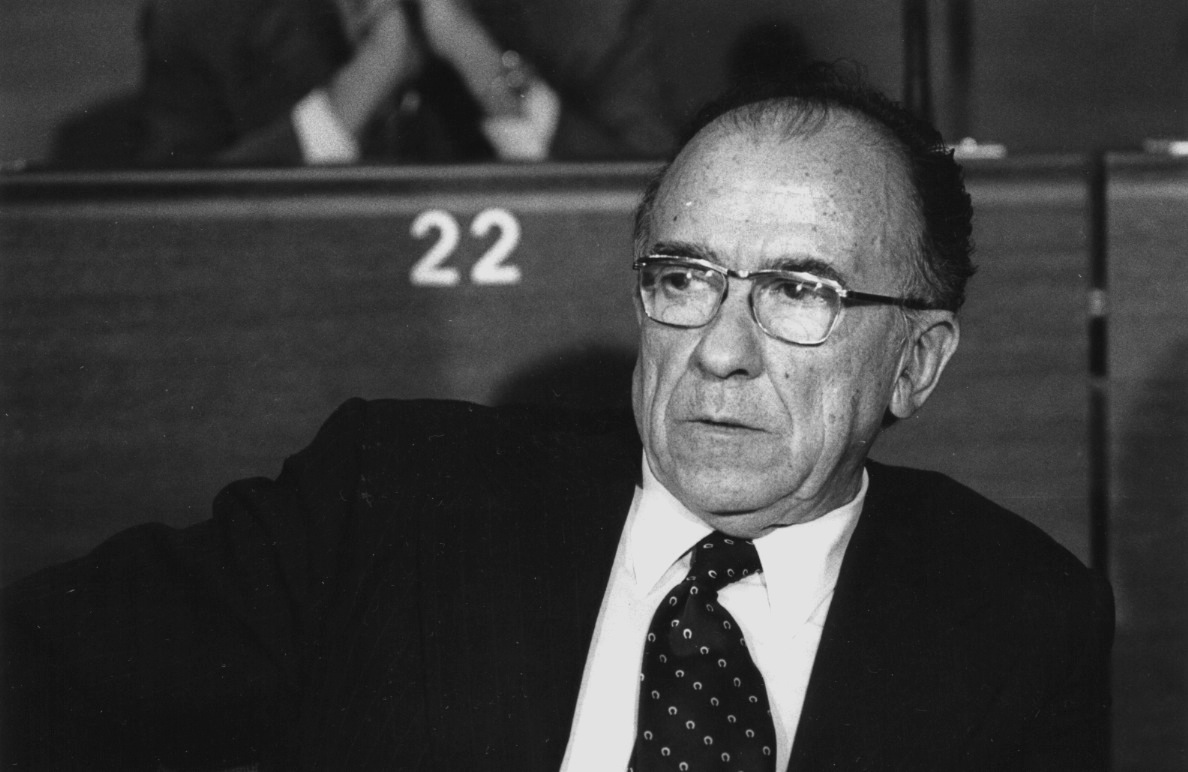
Santiago Carrillo

There are individuals who did not hold top positions in power structures yet made themselves known as particularly efficient when implementing new order. Agapito García Atadell became iconic celebrity as head of CIV squad until he defected in October 1936. Valero Serrano Tagueña and Marcos García Redondo gained names as leaders of Brigada de Amanacer and Los Linces de la República respectively. Carmelo Iglesias Muñoz was particularly active as head of a tribunal in 1936. Felipe Sandoval Cabrerizo worked as member of revolutionary tribunal and squad leader; instrumental during both Modelo and Paracuellos actions, he joined new Seguridad and until 1938 operated as member of Mancebo's unit. Fernando Valenti Fernandez engaged in counter-espionage investigations and headed Brigada Especial, widely known for setting traps; he was then seconded to DEDIDE and ended up in SIM. Elviro Ferret Obrador commanded the DGS Technical Secretariat squad and excelled in expropriations. Eduardo Val Bescós as chief of CNT Defence Committee was responsible for Anarchist militias throughout most of the war.

== Politics ==
Anarchist standard

Initially key personalities holding posts related to public order in Madrid fell generally into the range between militant Republicanism and moderate socialism. Mallol and Muñoz were former Republican Radical Socialists and both joined Izquierda Republicana in the mid-1930s, and Galarza was former PRRSI militant, but unlike his colleagues, he preferred to move to the PSOE and as a Socialist and a Largo Caballero nominee, he landed the job of Minister of Interior. The new head of the Madrid police appointed in late July, Manuel López Rey Arroyo, was also the IR man. Indeed, some scholars claim that early weeks of the war were marked by attempts to maintain "bourgeoisie policing", the pattern that was abandoned and gave way to a new type of security while the CPIP came into existence. Its creation acknowledged actual new balance of power, certified by mushrooming party and trade union militias. Attempts to gauge the share of political influences among the units are based on presumed affiliations of checas, operating in Madrid, but that measure is inconclusive. Analysis of some 300 points broadly classified as checas seems to suggest that the anarchist CNT-FAI and the communist PCE controlled some 25% of them each, with the rest distributed among PSOE, JSU, various Republican groupings and politically ambiguous units like UHP. Analysis of some 70 larger detention centres reveals a 34% domination of CNT-FAI, with PCE behind 19%, PSOE 13% and JSU behind 6% of the units.

The CPIP itself was theoretically controlled by a 30-member board divided equally among a number of parties, but its investigative squads reflected clear anarchist domination: 40% were related to CNT-FAI, 19% to PSOE and 19% to PCE. The end of "bourgeoisie policing" was marked also by transformation of CIV, the state plainclothes police, a formation that was overtaken by the Socialists, as 31% of new recruits were from UGT, 17% from PSOE, 15% from IR, 5% from PCE and mere 3% - perhaps unsurprisingly because of the anarchist position toward state structures in general and police in particular – from CNT-FAI. IGM, a body marginally involved in security system, was also in 64% dominated by PSOE with marginal anarchist presence. Definitely more important MVR was similarly the socialist fiefdom; its director Manzano was a PSOE man at the time and 59% of militiamen registered were members of UGT; however, PCE affiliations marked 17% of them recorded and membership in the communist-dominated JSU was indicated by 14%.

Political control of state security structures in Madrid turned a corner with the government leaving the capital. Within JDM, the public order department was seized by the communists, as reflected by appointments of Carrillo and Cazorla, especially since PSOE-dominated CPIP and IGM were soon disbanded, and MVR followed suit some time afterwards. However, late 1936 and early 1937 were marked by mounting conflict between the anarchists and the communists, which following a shootout and a cabinet war in the government led to dissolution of JDM; nevertheless, the Communists at least for some time retained control over some CIV brigades and used some in their campaigns, as suggested by Valenti's role in the fate of Nin. The Anarchists retained a grade of control over military counter-intelligence, supervised by Salgado and Val. Of the new bodies emergent in mid-1937, the Madrid DEDIDE was controlled by PCE while the Madrid SIM fell mostly into hands of the Socialists, as certified by political affiliations of its head, Pedrero. The new police force, Cuerpo de Seguridad, was in 70% composed of former CPIP and in 30% of former MVR members, which given structure of these two dissolved formations suggests that PSOE got the upper hand. The Republicans remained visible only in juridical bodies, e.g. in Jurados de Urgencia they formed 34% of the members, with CNT-FAI coming second at 21%.

PSOE symbol

It appears that throughout most of 1938 the Madrid public order system remained a politically balanced structure with Communists (DEDIDE), Anarchists (military counter-intelligence, militias) and Socialists (Seguridad, SIM) keeping each other in check. This shaky modus vivendi was demolished during the Casado coup in March 1939, when PSOE-led SIM and Anarchist-led military units crushed the Communist resistance. The showdown left some of PCE personalities executed, like it was the case of former IGM head Barceló, and some imprisoned, like it was the case of former DGS Security Council head Cazorla. The last person who might be considered the top positioned man of Republican Madrid security, Girauta, was a professional policeman-detective and can hardly be put into any political rubric.

== Aftermath ==
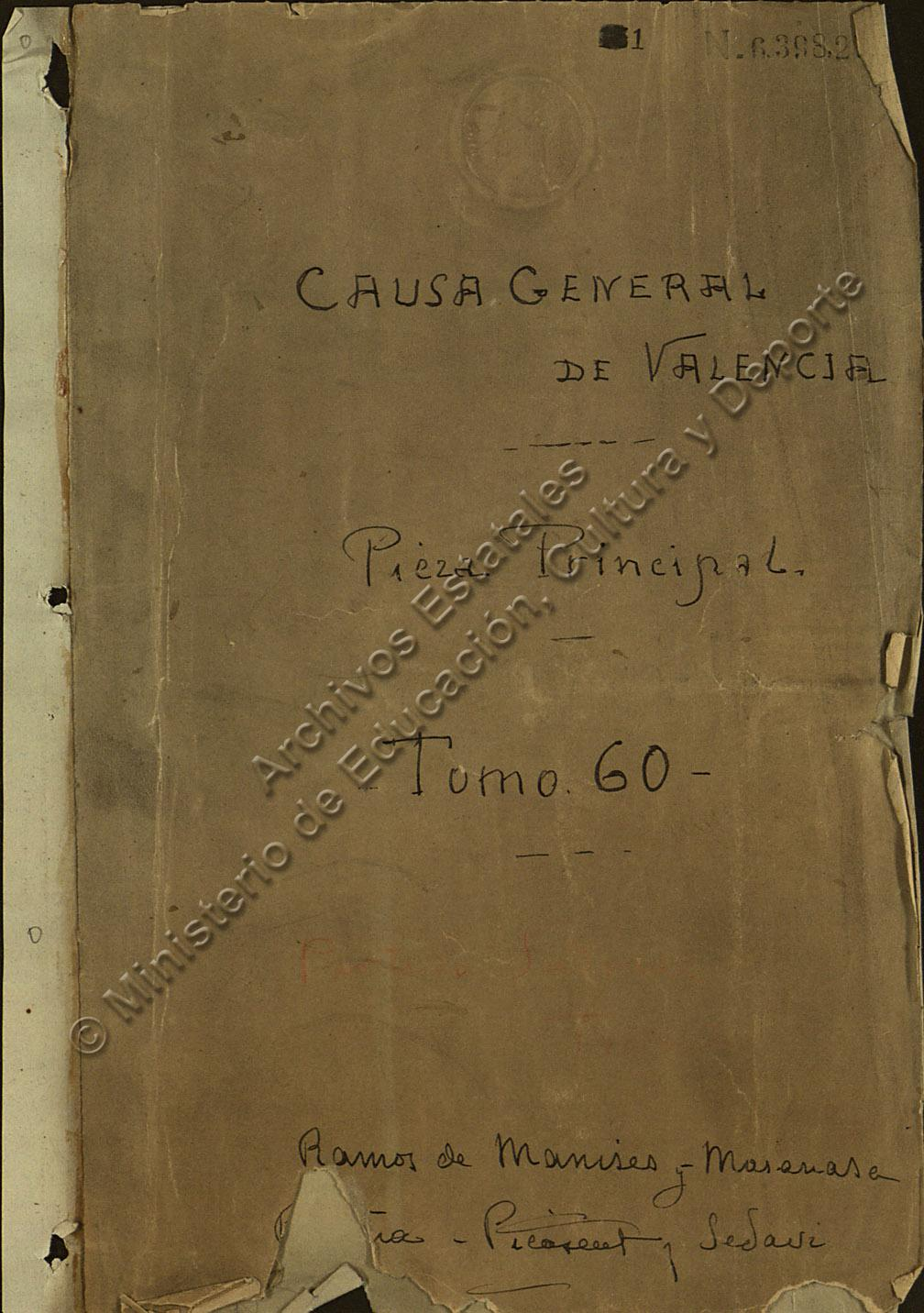
Causa General files

Few protagonists of the Madrid policing units were captured by the Nationalists in course of the war, but it was the case of Atadell, who in November 1936 was intercepted in Canary Islands when the French cruise liner that he had boarded in St. Nazaire was about to set off to Cuba. Some high officials who no longer held their posts (Galarza, Muñoz, Carrillo, Serrano Poncela, and Pozas) crossed the French border in Catalonia in early 1939. Most of them still involved left Madrid during final weeks of the war and headed for the Levantine coast, but few managed to leave Spain. Val secured a seat in an aircraft, and Duran and Salgado boarded a British warship. The rest found themselves trapped on the quays of Alicante in vain hopes for a ship to get them out. Many, like Girauta, Manzano, de Mora, Pedrero, Sandoval and Valenti, were apprehended there and identified already in April 1939. Some managed to slip through the Nationalist security net and tried to start a new life assuming a false identity. However, the Francoist hunters were determined in their pursuit; Mancebo and Cazorla were caught in August 1939, García Redondo in July 1940, Iglesias in November 1940 and Rascón in July 1941. Muñoz was handed over by Vichy France in August 1942. Ferret spent 14 years on the run before he was detained in June 1953. Most underwent brutal interrogation; Sandoval terminated it by committing suicide. The rest were all executed, some by garrote. Duran, Galarza, Mallol, Pozas, Salgado, Serrano Poncela and Val died on exile, some of them, like Serrano Poncela, as distinguished personalities. In general, out of 1,143 individuals identified as active in the Madrid Republican public order system around 90 are known to have been executed after the war. Some of them got captured but survived imprisonment and were eventually set free. Rodríguez García was sentenced to a long incarceration, but was released in 1944. Anselmo Gil Burgos, head of so-called Checa de Fuencarral, was first sentenced to death and had the sentence lowered to 30 years in prison. He was conditionally released in 1944. The fate of some individuals is unknown.

After the war, the Spanish Ministerio Fiscal launched massive investigation into the Republican repression nationwide. The scheme, commonly known as Causa General, stockpiled colossal documentation to serve as basis for criminal investigations, historical research and propaganda activities. Indeed, authorities launched a massive campaign that was intended to present the republican rule in Madrid as period of savage barbarity and to honor its victims. Apart from frequent press notes, there were tens of documentary, paradocumentary or historical books on what was dubbed the "Red Terror" published every year, and Madrid featured prominently in most of them; it is estimated that some 450 related works were released until 1975 but mostly during the first two decades of Francoism. The republican system of public order was depicted in culture and presented as horrific machine of murder in numerous novels and in some films. Following exhumation of bodies some execution scenes were turned into commemorative sites, which was the case especially of Paracuellos de Jarama, where El Cementerio de los Mártires was constructed and at times visited by the officials but remained frequented by relatives of these executed.

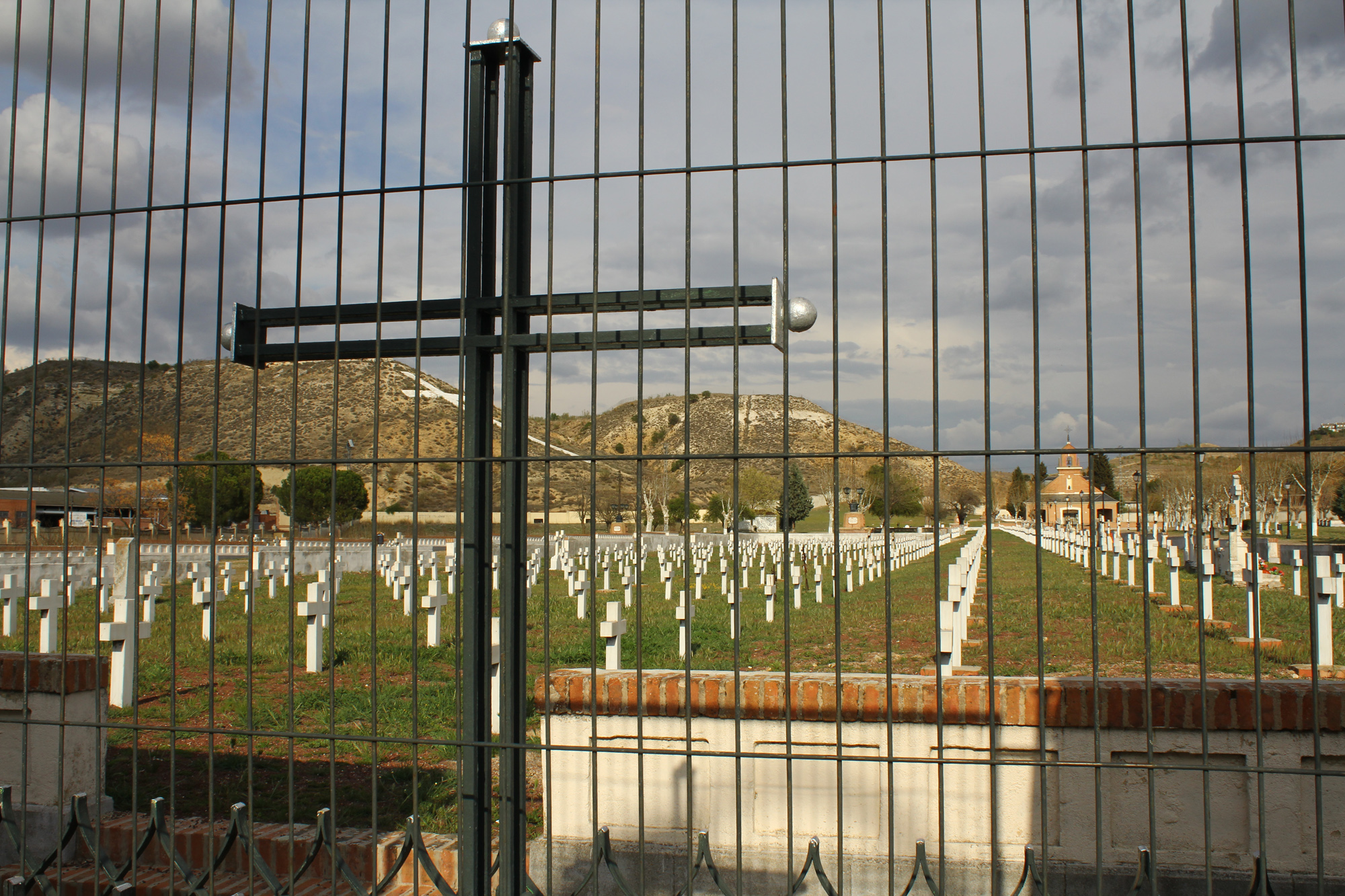
Cementerio de los Mártires in Paracuellos de Jarama (present-day view)

After the death of Franco, public attention shifted to the Nationalist repression. Memory of victims of Republican violence in Madrid was cultivated mostly by their relatives, but it periodically gained renewed attention, especially in relation to Santiago Carrillo; his re-entry into politics sparked a heated controversy, which continued for decades and climaxed in a failed attempt to launch legal action on basis of presumed crimes against humanity. Some major new publications, e.g. the 1983 Ian Gibson's work on Paracuellos, renewed public attention; it was also the case of beatifications, proceeded and completed by pope John Paul II in the 1990s and Benedict XVI in the early 21st century. Public debate on role and official acknowledgement of the Madrid repression system continued. In 2015, the Comisionado de Memoria Histórica marked the Bellas Artes checa, the Modelo prison and the Porlier prison to feature among 15 "sites of historical memory" in Madrid. The proposal generated ongoing public controversy related to the list of sites and exact wording used. Initially, it was intended to mount plaques commemorating the victims, but according to legal expertise obtained the proposal would be incompatible with Ley de Memoria Histórica, which prohibits "exaltación de la sublevación militar, de la Guerra Civil y de la represión de la Dictadura". So far, minor plaques are currently mounted in premises which do not form public space like in religious buildings. Debates related to other initiatives of the Madrid town hall continue.

== Historiography ==
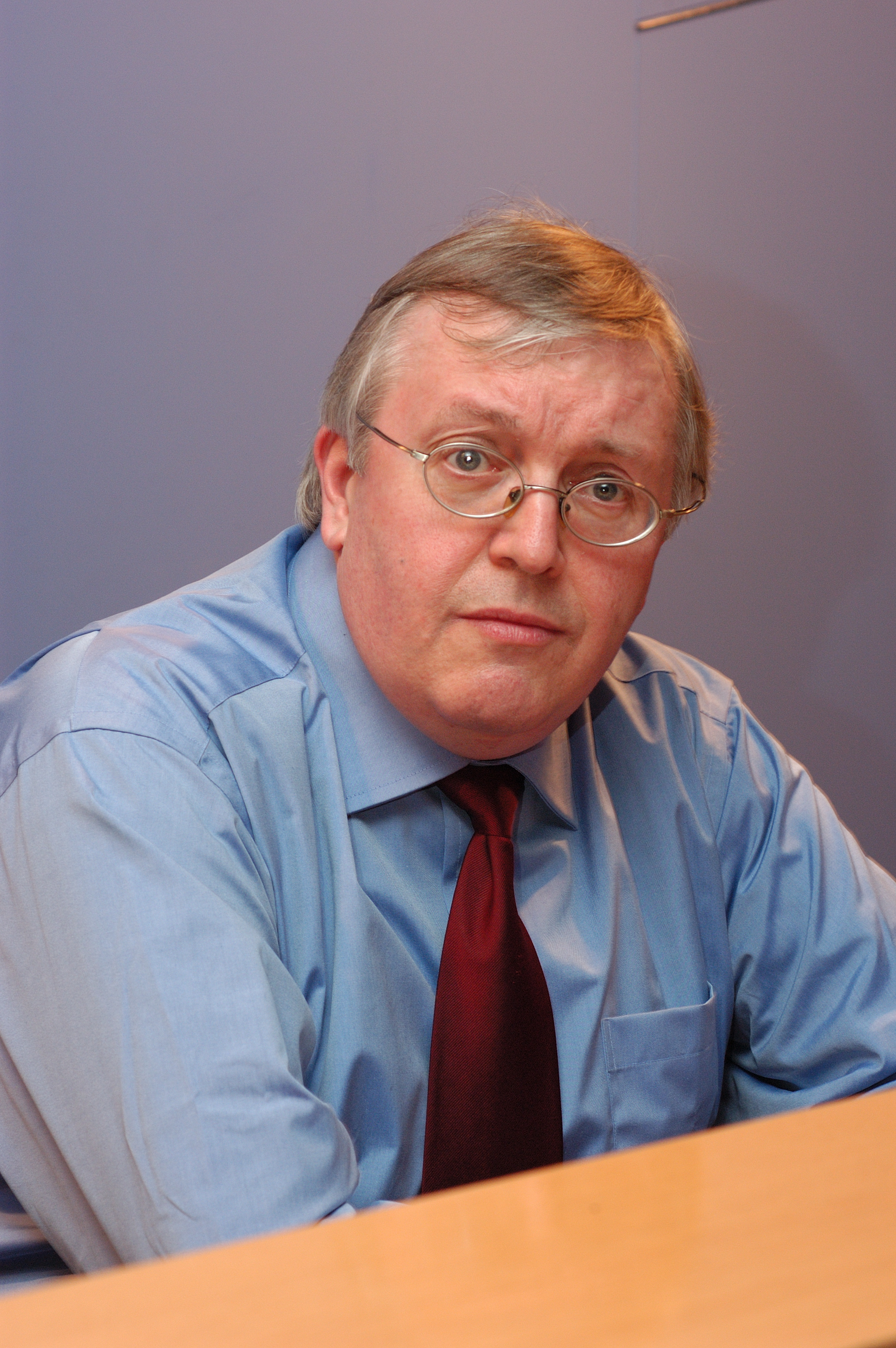
Paul Preston

Historiography on the violence in the Civil War is massive and grows continually. Until 1975, the focus was mostly on terror behind the Republican lines; in the late 20th century, attention shifted to Nationalist repression. Research on the Loyalist zone has been reinvigorated recently, resulting in at least three major works dedicated to Madrid; Some specific issues, especially the Paracuellos killings, also earned a sizeable literature. However, the contributions are by no means to complete investigation. Most questions raised are still subject to historiographic debates, usually unrelated to Madrid specifics but referring to violence during the Civil War in general. In the early 21st century, it was hoped that the discourse was approaching "synthesis" and "normalisación". but that judgment turned decisively premature; quite to the contrary, the debate grew "more heated than ever before".

The central point of almost all debates is the role of state structures in repression behind the Republican lines. Most generally, the discussion is whether violence occurred in spite of, or because of, the regime. Some claim that terror was integral to the republican system, and some maintain that it was fundamentally opposed by official structures. Most specific problems are part of the general dilemma. One of the questions is the existence of a blueprint for extermination; some suggest that republican violence resulted from a premeditated general strategy, others claim that no such plan, strategy or intention has ever existed. Another question is whether violence might be perceived as a revolution; some scholars see the Civil War principally in revolutionary terms, but others note that violence "was not related to any revolutionary project". These who associate violence with revolution debate whether it was a Communist, multifold or "leaderless" one. Some suppose that the state was assuming a revolutionary format and some disagree by claiming that it competed for power with revolutionary groupings. Accordingly, there are conflicting views of public realm shaped either by collapse of state or by excess of state power or by fragmentation of power.

A separate problem is "autonomous violence" or the impact of criminal activity; some consider it central and key for terror in the Republican rear, others apply the criminal tag to systemic nature of the Republic, and some consider the criminal thread generally misleading. A related analytical concept is this of "incontrolados"; some approach them as key agents of violence, others claim that principal protagonists of terror were firmly mounted within political structures. The role of ideology remains disputed; some name the public order model adopted in the Republican zone a "crusade" against ideological enemies and underline importance of inflammatory, ideology-driven press, others claim that focus on ideology obscures a complex tangle of various factors. One more point is whether terror behind the Republican lines was reactive. There are scholars who discuss outbreaks of violence in relation to specific preceding events or to systemic features of Spanish society and politics. Others either question factual sequences presented or the logic of structural links advanced and reject the "reactive" label. A related problem is this of continuity; some students see the wartime unrest as climax of violence mounting through previous decades, others make it clear that these are two clearly distinct phenomena. One more and also related puzzle is about selective or sweeping nature of terror, namely whether it was directed against specific individuals, whether it was generally chaotic or whether it was aimed against particular sections of the population. Many authors claim that since there was no real threat of Fifth Column, the Republican repressive measures were means of terrorizing the population; many others relate violence to anti-Republican conspiracy and consider it mostly means of fighting Nationalist subversion. The role of the Soviets remains another point of contention; some students consider it instrumental, others tend to view it as of minor importance.

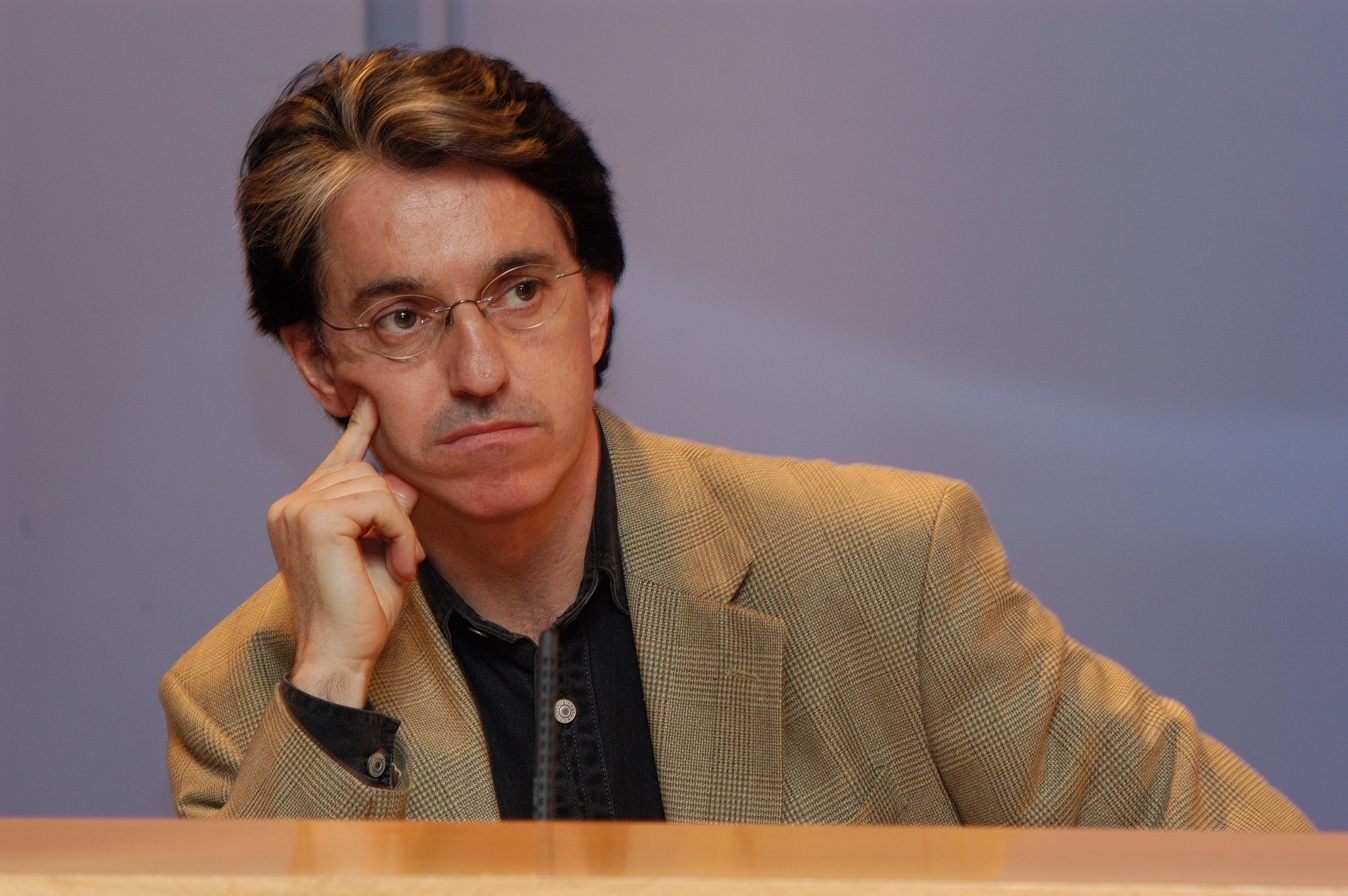
Julian Casanova

Most if not all questions discussed in general translate also to specifics of Madrid; in case of the capital they might be anchored in issues related to 100-day period of central government institutions operating from the capital, genesis and role of CPIP, transformation of police force, relations between JDM and central authorities operating from Valencia, mechanics of the Paracuellos executions, responsibility of single individuals like Carrillo, Orlov or Galarza, functioning of local branches of central institutions like DEDIDE, SIM or DGS, role of the Fifth Column, specifics related to proximity to the frontlines, local balance of power between key political groupings or Madrid dynamics of the Casado coup. However, local-scale analysis has not significantly contributed to reaching consensus in general debate and in most of the cases discussed agreement seems to be nowhere near; moreover, in terms of tension and vitriol historiographic debate has been recently brought to another level and some suggest that it is less of a historiography and more of a memory war.

== See also ==
- Red Terror (Spain)
- Paracuellos massacres
- Madrid Defense Council
- Revisionism (Spain)
