= Ramón González Peña =

Spanish socialist and trade union leader

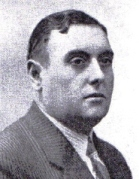

Minister of Justice
- In office 5 April 1938 – 1 April 1939
- Preceded by: Tomás Bilbao Hospitalet
- Succeeded by: Tomás Domínguez Arévalo

Personal details
- Born: 11 July 1888 Las Regueras, Spain
- Died: 27 July 1952 (aged 64) Mexico City, Mexico
- Party: Spanish Socialist Workers' Party
- Known for: Being a leader of the Asturian miners' strike of 1934

Ramón González Peña (11 July 1888 – 27 July 1952) was a Spanish socialist and trade union leader. Born in Asturias, González was a prominent leader in the 1934 miners revolt, under which he led the Oviedo Revolutionary Committee. After the revolt, he was sentenced to death. One year later, however, he was reprieved. González served as the president of Unión General de Trabajadores, in which he was in conflict with Largo Caballero. He was also a Member of Parliament and was the Minister of Justice 1938–1939. After the Spanish Civil War González Peña went to exile in Mexico, where he died on 27 July 1952.

Political offices
Preceded by Mariano Ansó	Minister of Justice; 1938–1939	Succeeded by Miguel San Andrés
Party political offices
Preceded by Francisco Largo Caballero	President of the Spanish Socialist Workers' Party; 1936–1939	Succeeded by José Gómez Osorio
Preceded by Francisco Largo Caballero	Leader of the Socialist Group in the Congress of Deputies; 1937–1939	Vacant Title next held by Felipe González
