= Turón =

Coordinates: 36°52′N 3°03′W

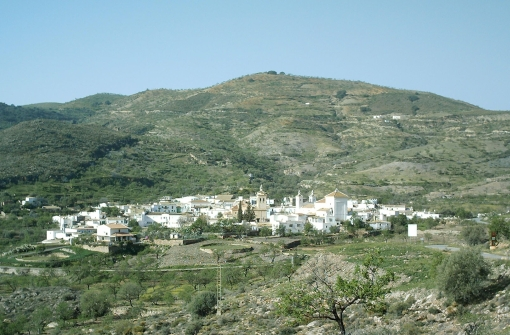
- View of Turón

- Flag Coat of arms

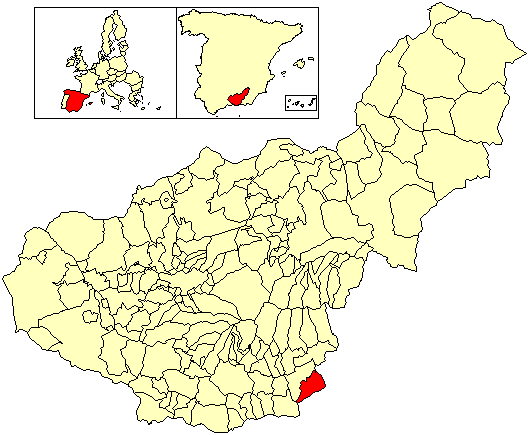

- Location in Spain.
- Country: Spain
- Autonomous community: Andalusia
- Province: Granada

Area
  - Total: 55.53 km^{2} (21.44 sq mi)
- Elevation: 684 m (2,244 ft)

Population (2025-01-01)
  - Total: 203
  - Density: 3.66/km^{2} (9.47/sq mi)
- Time zone: UTC+1 (CET)
  - Summer (DST): UTC+2 (CEST)
- Website: www.turon.es

Turón is a municipality in the province of Granada, Spain. As of 2010, it has a population of 297 inhabitants.

== See also ==
- List of municipalities in Granada
