= Artemio Precioso (writer) =

Artemio Precioso García
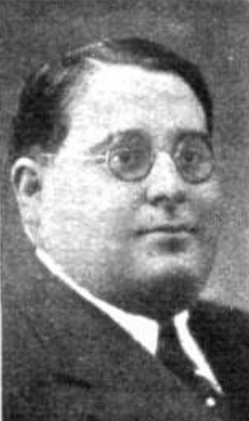
- Born: 1891; Hellín, Spain
- Died: 1945 (aged 53–54); Isso, Spain
- Occupation: lawyer
- Known for: writer, publisher, journalist, civil servant
- Political party: republicanism

Artemio Precioso García (1891 – 1945) was a Spanish writer, publisher and civil servant. He is known as the author of some 30 novels, published mostly in the 1920s and intended for popular audience. He contributed to numerous press titles and managed some usually ephemeral periodicals himself. Politically he was related to moderate left-wing republicanism; in 1934 he served as civil governor of the province of Toledo, and in 1934–1936 at the same post in Lugo.

== Family and early years ==
Precioso was son to a well-off bourgeouisie family; his father owned some land property and minor metalworking establishments in the Albacete province. He studied law, first in Valencia and then in Madrid; it is during his academic period that he started to contribute articles to Madrid press.

Precioso married Marina de Ugarte Cristóbal, a girl from Vascongadas. The couple had 3 children, first 2 daughters and then a boy (Artemio Precioso Ugarte, later a communist militant, emigree in the USSR and eventually a respected economist and ecologist). Marina died in 1918 as the victim of influenza.

In 1920 Precioso and his children moved to Madrid, where he set up his own law firm; in the early 1920s he also launched a literary review, La novela de hoy. He remarried with his cousin, Amelia Precioso Lafuente, and had 3 further daughters.

== Publisher and writer ==
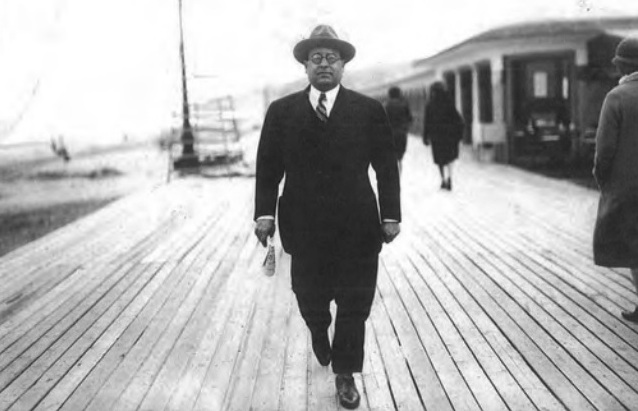
late 1920s

La novela de hoy turned into a publisher of a fiction collection. Precioso was one of the guiding lights behind the series, which consisted of more than 500 volumes. He was followed in this mission by Pedro Sainz Rodríguez. He also ran the humour magazine Muchas Gracias.

As a novelist, he wrote popular (often erotic) fiction for the masses. Among his numerous titles in the 1920s and the 1930s were: Rosa de carne, Vivir dos veces, La virgen casada, El doctor y su amiga, El crimen del otro, El hijo legal, El juego de la vida, Por qué engañan ellas, Pasión y muerte, Cuando el amor nace, El légamo de la tragedia, El millonario polígamo, El triunfo de Carmela, Judías verdes, Isabel Clara, La doble pasión, La muerte de un señorito juerguista, La que suiso ser libre, La tragedia del gordo, La verdadera mujer, La vida estéril (Tierra baldía), El crimen de un celoso, Memorias de un médico, ¡Lavó su honra!, Evas y manzanas, Los nuevos ricos de la moral, etc.

Precioso was one of the intellectuals who were part of the "Decadentismo" movement in Spanish culture. The others were Antonio de Hoyos y Vinent, Álvaro Retana and Ramón María del Valle-Inclán. Apart from Valle-Inclan, the rest fled to Paris. Precioso was a literary translator as well; he translated from French the works of Emmanuel Bove, Maurice Constantin Weyer and André Maurois, and from English Volpone by Ben Jonson.

== Politics ==
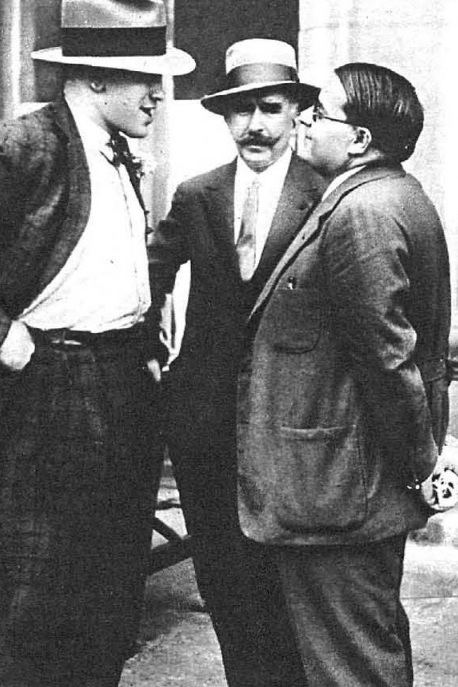
mid-1930s (right)

Precioso was a Republican by political inclination, though it is not clear whether it contributed to conflict with Primo de Rivera. A satirical story by Ramon Valle-Inclan displeased the dictator: Precioso's publishing business collapsed, and in 1927 he left Spain for France.

He returned to Madrid in 1934. At the time he was already in political entourage of Diego Martínez Barrio, whom he befriended during the exile years in Paris. In February 1934 Barrio, at the time the Minister of Interior in the Alejandro Lerroux government, nominated Precioso the civil governor of Toledo province, but his term was rather brief. In June 1934 the new minister moved him to the parallel post in Lugo. During the 1936 elections he joined the Portelistas; he co-engineered electoral fraud in Lugo, intended to ensure victory of Party of the Democratic Centre.

Precioso was dismissed from the civil governor post shortly after the Popular Front government took power, in late February 1936. According to some press titles he was driven away by Guardia Civil in handcuffs, the news he denied. He resumed his press career, publishing ongoing – and at times ironic - commentary to political developments.

== Last years ==
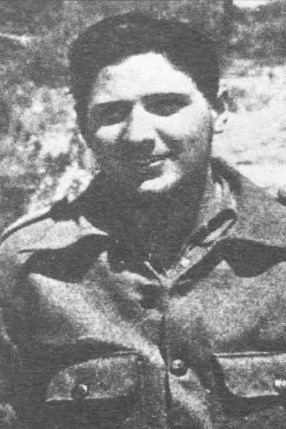
son as tank commander

Outbreak of the civil war caught Precioso in Madrid. Initially he resided in the capital, active in Agrupacion Profesional de Periodistas. In early 1937 he was editor-in-chief of the daily El Liberal, but did not feature prominently in Republican cultural life. Later the same year he withdrew from Madrid to Hellin, where he served as a local judge. At the time his barely 20-year-old son, of clear Communist preferences, was advancing in ranks of the Republican army and in early 1939 commanded a tank battalion in Levante.

Following the Nationalist triumph Precioso was trialed by a military tribunal; he was accused of rebellion, the customary charge applied to individuals considered Republican supporters. As a lawyer he stood in his own defence; the primate Isidro Goma pronounced in his favour. Sentenced to death, he got the sentence commuted to 7 years in prison. He remained behind bars for 3 years, mostly in prisons in Cadiz and Madrid; incarceration in poor conditions contributed to rapid deterioration of his health. He was released in 1942.

Once on liberty, Precioso settled at what remained of his family estate in Isso, not far from Hellin. His last years were spent in very poor health, poverty and solitude (his son was in the USSR at the time; the fate of his daughters is unknown). His death was moderately acknowledged in the Francoist press; he was noted as “lawyer and writer”, author of “peculiar producción literaria”.

== See also ==
- Artemio Precioso Ugarte
