= 1936 Spanish presidential election =

- 26 April 1936 (public vote); 10 May 1936 (electoral college)
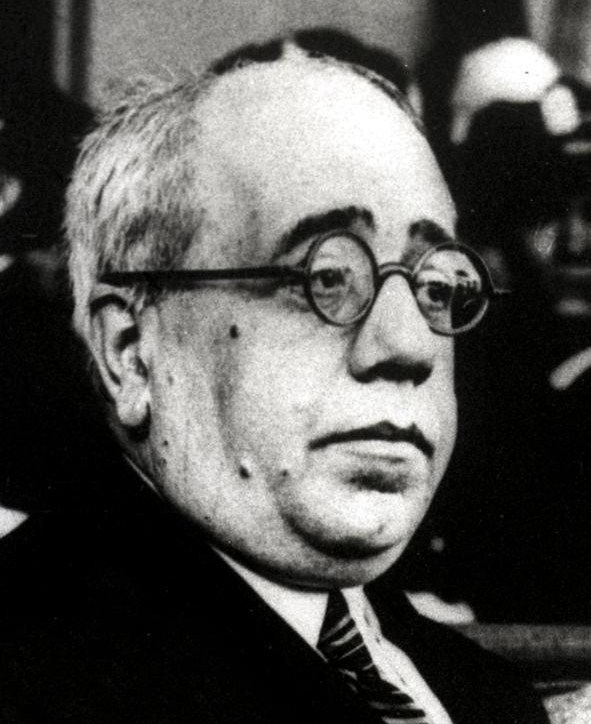
Nominee	Manuel Azaña
Party	Popular Front
Electoral vote	754
Percentage	100%
President before election
Niceto Alcalá Zamora
DLR
Elected President
Manuel Azaña
Popular Front

Indirect presidential elections were held in Spain on 26 April and 10 May 1936. In the first stage, 473 electors were elected; in the second, the 473 electors convened in an Electoral College with the 473 members of the Congress of Deputies in order to elect the President of the Spanish Republic, as required by Article 68 of the Spanish Constitution of 1931.

== Background ==
The elections were called after President Niceto Alcalá Zamora was dismissed by Congress due to irregularities in the dissolution of the House in 1936, which was declared 'unjustified'. This move was seen as personal revenge by the Popular Front against Alcalá Zamora, who had called for a general election at an unfavorable time for the left, and while the right was more cautious about carrying out the dismissal process, calling for a constitutional review by the Court of Constitutional Guarantees, it also supported the decision.

== Results ==
Turnout was low, failing to reach 40 percent. This was due to the main opposition party, the right-wing CEDA, boycotting the process, a decision which was widely criticized, to no avail. The Popular Front did contest the elections, nominating Manuel Azaña as its presidential candidate on 30 April, as well as minor right-wing parties in different provinces. There are no official results from the elections, but accounts from contemporary newspapers give a figure of 393–394 electors affiliated with the Popular Front, with the opposition (republican conservatives, radicals, nationalists, agrarians, independents, an insignificant figure of members of the CEDA and unaffiliated electors) winning 79–80 electoral votes; the left won at least in 28 provinces, whereas the opposition carried 4 of them.

The Electoral College met at the Palacio de Cristal of the Parque del Retiro in Madrid on Sunday, 10 May 1936. With 847 members out of 911 present, Azaña was elected with 754 votes (from the Popular Front, Republican Conservatives, Radicals, Centrists and nationalists), and therefore became the new president of the Spanish Republic. He took the oath of office the following day, and after tense negotiations, Galician regionalist politician Santiago Casares Quiroga became the new prime minister.
