= El légamo de la tragedia =

1924 novel by Artemio Precioso

- Author: Artemio Precioso
- Language: Spanish
- Genre: Novel
- Publication date: 1924
- Publication place: Spain

El légamo de la tragedia (English: The mud of tragedy) is a short novel by Spanish author Artemio Precioso. It was published as a part of the collection no. 108 of the La Novela de Hoy ("Today's Novel") in 1924 and is inspired by real events. The illustrations in the book were made by painter and illustrator Rafael de Penagos.

== Background ==
The novel is based on the events that occurred on 15 March 1924. Purificación González, daughter of a former crown minister Alfonso González, was killed in the atrium of the church of San Ginés by Gonzalo Colina, with whom she has had a previous relationship. Both had known each other since childhood and had started a relationship months earlier. Purificación severed the relationship after she got attracted to Fortunato Gómez. Before committing the crime, Colina told his father of his intention to kill the young woman if she did not resume their relationship, which prompted him to warn Purificación.

On the day of the crime, at 8:30 in the morning, the victim went to the parish accompanied by a maid. In the atrium of the church, she was intercepted by Colina, who fired several shots that caused her death. Subsequently, he tried to commit suicide without success and took refuge inside the church, from where he was arrested by the police. After being transferred to police station, he confessed to being the perpetrator of the crime.

== Synopsis ==
In the novel, the author used the aforementioned events to devise a fictional story. In the novel, Anita Gutierrez is the daughter of the finance minister, who is in love with Octavio Arenal, a poor medical student. Gutierrez is later courted by journalist Josefina Alver, and falls into love with her, based on her physical traits and fondness for cycling. The protagonist abandons her lover Arenal, who then kills her for not forgoing their relationship.

== Analysis and reception ==
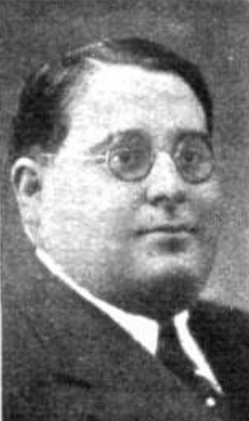
Author Artemio Precioso

As the plot was supposedly based on the crime of San Ginés, Artemio Precioso exposed several elements that is considered to have affected the reputation of the upper class familiess, and prompted critical reactions by various public figures, including the Marquis of Astorga. Purificación's mother filed a lawsuit against the author for defamation based on the similarities between the work and the facts of her daughter's case. In parallel, the author was prosecuted by the prosecutor's office on the charge of creating a public scandal.

Subsequently, Precioso used media to defend his position describing the work as a part of freedom of artistic creation and questioned the limitations imposed on certain content through the moral lens. The author's position led to a debate amongst the public so as to the limits of fiction and the social norms linked to sexual morality. Journalist José Montero criticized the author and his work, which led to Precioso going to the headquarters of the newspaper in which the journalist worked, and assaulting him physically. The act increased public scrutiny on the work and the case. Later, journalist Joaquín Corrales compared the content of the author's works to his physical conduct.

Journalist Matilde Muñoz filed a lawsuit focused on the right to use another person's image, apart from considerations linked to the public dissemination about the case. She based her claim on the legal protection of the honour of women, in reference to judicial precedents, and argued that the author had taken her image as a basis for the construction of a particular character in the plot. She pointed out the coincidence between certain personal traits of her and the characterization of the particular feminine character. She was awarded compensation of two hundred and fifty thousand pesetas, considering that, as a result of the case, she had lost her job in El Imparcia and had to shift to Paris. The sentence was later upheld by the Supreme Court of Spain.
