= Plácido Francés y Pascual =

Spanish painter (1834–1902)

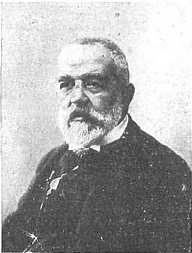
- Plácido Francés y Pascual, from Nuevo Mundo
- Born: April 1834; Alcoy, Spain
- Died: 12 December 1902 (aged 68); Madrid, Spain
- Known for: Painter
- Movement: Orientalist; Costumbrista

Plácido Francés y Pascual (April 1834 – 12 December 1902) was a Spanish painter who specialized in portraits, historical scenes and Costumbrista.

== Biography ==
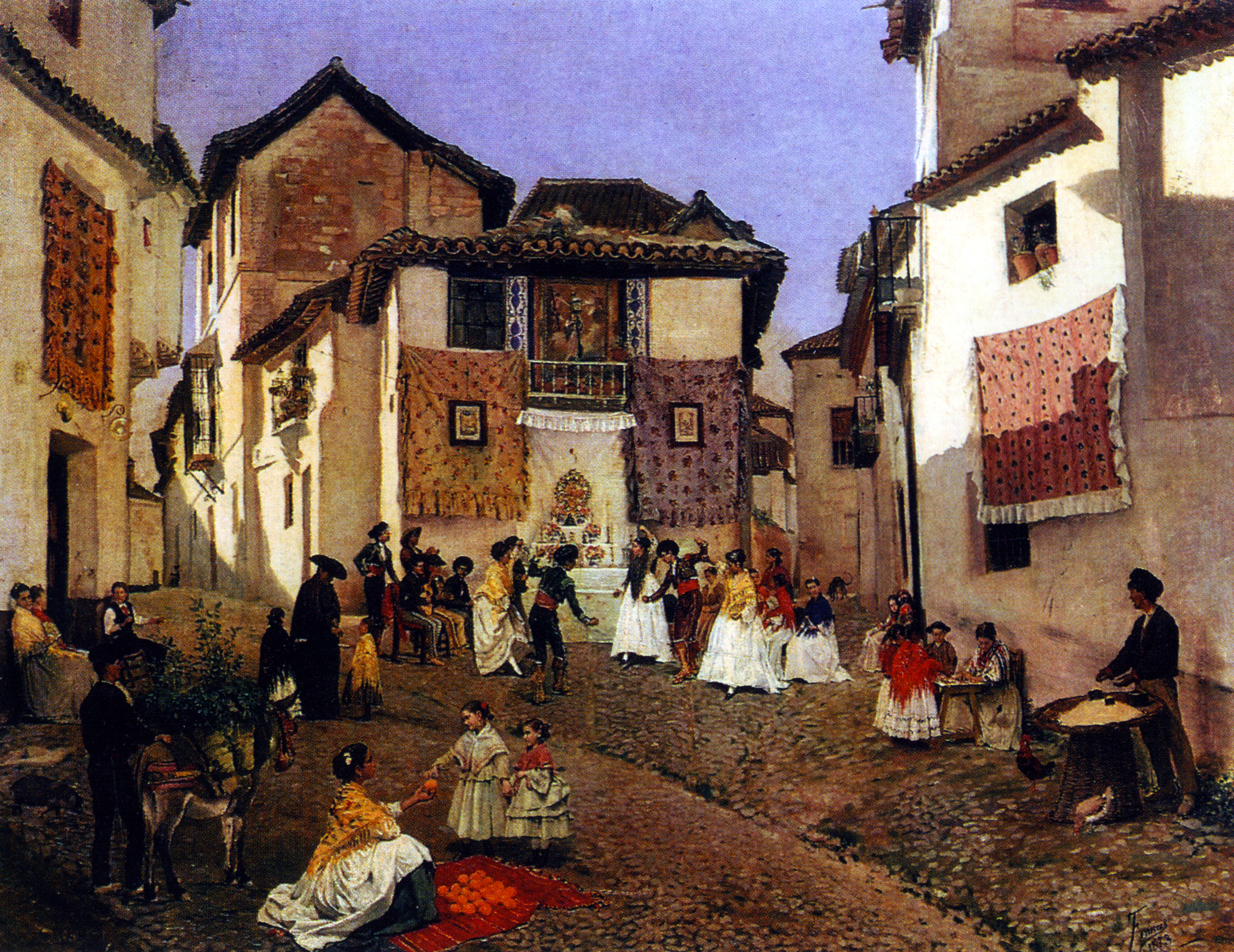
Fiesta de las Cruces in Albayzín

He was born in Alcoy, and began his artistic education in Valencia, but moved to Madrid in 1854 to complete his studies. He became a Professor of drawing at the "Escuela Superior de Bellas Artes de Valencia" in 1861. Antonio Cortina Farinós was one of his best-known students.

In 1862, he created decorations for the "Palacio del Marqués de Dos Aguas" in Valencia. Four years later, he painted ceiling medallions of Venus with putti and cherubs for the palace's ballroom. He also worked at the palaces of the Duke of Santoña and the Marqués de Larios.

In 1870, he relocated to Madrid, where he became one of the founders of the Círculo de Bellas Artes and the "Asociación de Acuarelistas de Madrid". He also became a professor at the Real Academia de Bellas Artes de San Fernando and began showing his works at the annual National Exhibition of Fine Arts, where he won medals in 1871, 1890 and 1892. His illustrations often appeared in the magazine Blanco y Negro. In 1882, he was awarded the Cross of the Order of Carlos III.

He died in Madrid, aged 68. Two of his children also became painters: Fernanda Francés y Arribas (1862-1939), who specialized in painting flowers, and Juan Francés y Mexía. His cousin was the painter Emilio Sala, who was also one of his students.
