= Conservative Republican Party =

The Conservative Republican Party may refer to:

- Conservative Republican Party (Brazil)
- Conservative Republican Party (Spain)
- Conservative Republican Party (United States)

== See also ==
- Conservative Republicans, faction of the modern day Republican Party in the United States
- Conservative Republicans (Reconstruction era)
- Conservative Party (disambiguation)
- Republican Party (disambiguation)
