= Farinós =

Farinós is a surname. Notable people with the surname include:

- Javier Farinós (born 1978), Spanish footballer
- Antonio Cortina Farinós (1841–1890), Spanish artist
