= Artemio Precioso =

Artemio Precioso may refer to:

- Artemio Precioso Ugarte (1917–2007), Spanish economist and environmentalist
- Artemio Precioso (writer) (1891–1945), Spanish writer and editor
