= Rafael de Penagos =

Spanish painter

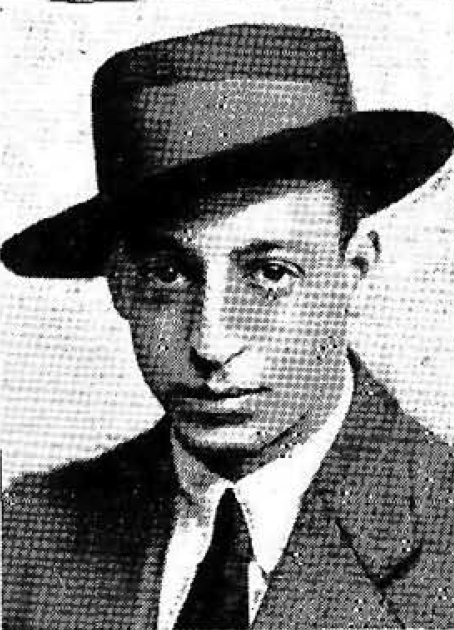
Rafael de Penagos in 1915

Rafael de Penagos (7 Mar 1889–1954) was a Spanish illustrator and painter. He was a practitioner of the art deco style and considered one of the most representative figures of Madrilenian modernism.

== Life ==
Penagos studied at the Academia de Bellas Artes de San Fernando (Academy of Fine Arts of San Fernando), where he studied under Emilio Sala and Antonio Muñoz Degrain, two major illustrators of the magazine Blanco y Negro. From the beginning of his time at the academy, Penagos had focused on both drawing and painting, but he soon demonstrated enormous skill in the art of drawing. He immersed himself in the cultural life of Madrid, and participated assiduously in the tertulias of Valle-Inclán at the Nuevo Café de Levante.

In 1913, he received a scholarship to study in Paris and London. On his return to Spain, he began to produce a large number of posters and advertisements for various firms. At the same time, he worked as an illustrator for the main magazines of the time: Nuevo Mundo, La Esfera, Estampa, Ahora, and Blanco y Negro, and for periodicals such as El Cuento Semanal, La Novela Corta and Prometeo.

In 1925, he received the most prestigious prize an artist could receive for his time: the gold medal at the International Exposition of Modern Industrial and Decorative Arts.

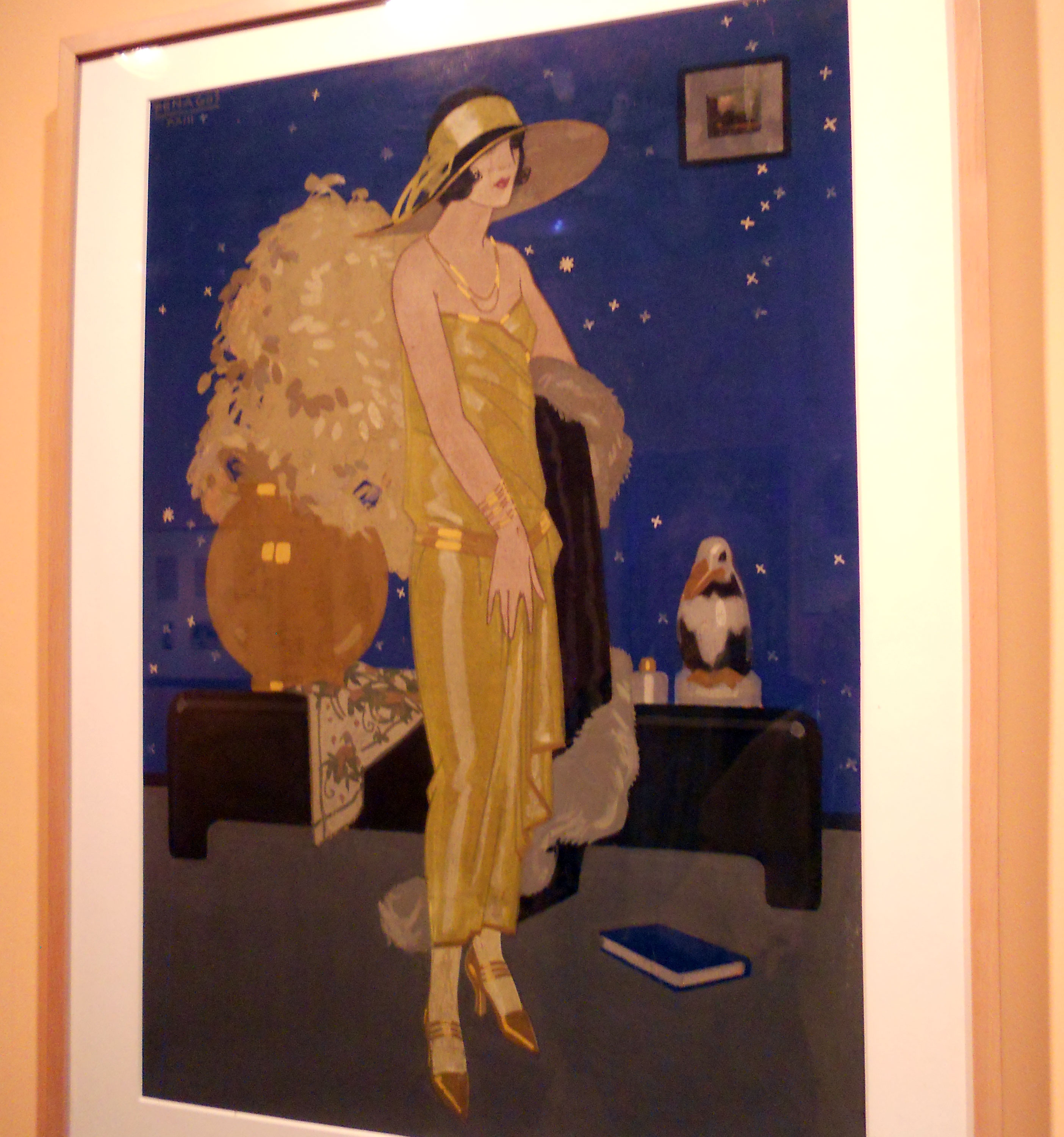
Depiction of a modern, urban woman.

He illustrated the heroines of the novels of Emilio Salgari, such as Yolanda, Daughter of the Black Corsair and Honorata de Wan Guld.

In 1926, he drew the poster for the film by Florián Rey called Agustina de Aragón. During the Spanish Civil War, Penagos lived in Valencia, serving as chair of the department of Illustration at the Instituto Obrero de Valencia. He was one of the major poster designers of the Republican side, but most of the magazines he had worked for had by this time already disappeared.

In 1948 he went into exile to Chile and Argentina. In 1953 he returned to Spain, and died a year later in Madrid, where he had served as the chair of the department of Illustration at the Instituto de Bachillerato Cervantes.

== Work ==
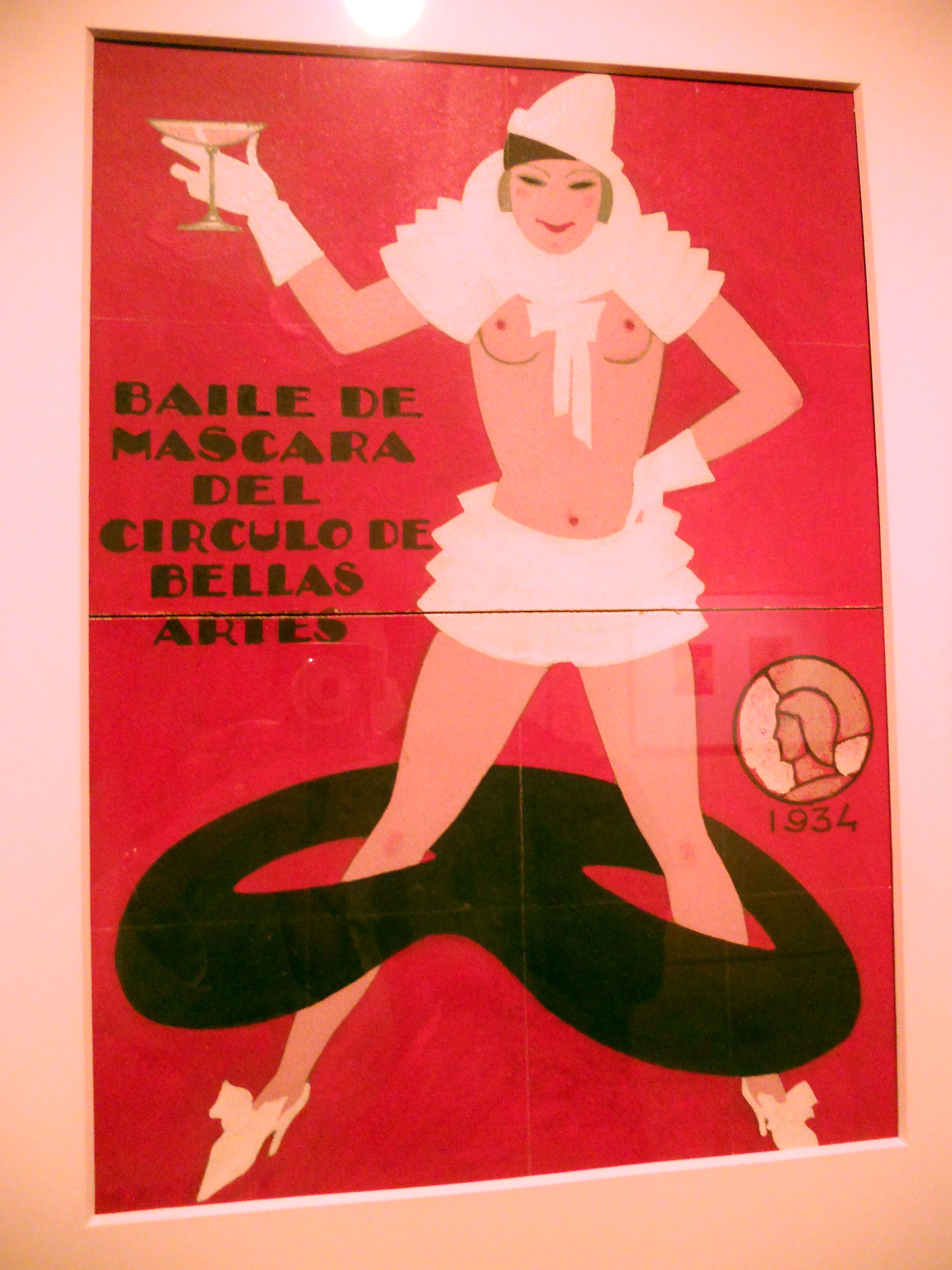
Poster by Penagos

Penagos’ art deco illustrations represented a new Spanish society that was urban and modern. He created a type of woman known as the "mujer Penagos": daring, well-dressed, sophisticated, and provocative. The “mujer Penagos” was also slender, with narrow hips, smoked cigarettes, played sophisticated sports, and loved anything exotic. Manuel Peña Muñoz remarks that "life copied art. Because Penagos didn't paint the Madrilenian woman, but the reverse: the Madrilenian woman painted herself like the Penagos Women." Penagos' illustrations helped change the mentality and customs of the Spanish woman, making her life feel less provincial and more European and cosmopolitan. Penagos "gave them a bob cut, made them more slender, put them on a bicycle, had them smoke from a cigarette holder, painted their nails red, and if that wasn't enough, had them dance the Charleston."

The most important collection of his work, consisting of 246 works, is owned by the Fundación MAPFRE. His son, also named Rafael de Penagos, became a well-known voice-over actor. His son collected his father's various works, which were published in 1989 as Penagos by Calpe S.A.
