= Miguel Maura =

Spanish politician (1887–1971)

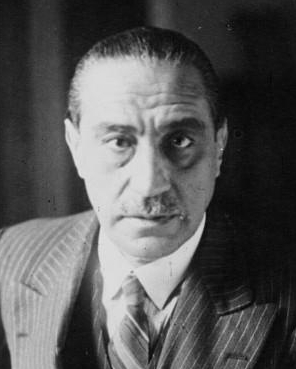

Minister of Interior
- In office April 1931 – 14 October 1931
- Prime Minister: Niceto Alcalá-Zamora

Personal details
- Born: 13 December 1887 Madrid, Spain
- Died: 3 July 1971 (aged 83) Zaragoza, Spain
- Party: Conservative Republican Party
- Parent: Antonio Maura (father)
- Relatives: Gabriel Maura (brother); Germán Gamazo (uncle)

Miguel Maura Gamazo (13 December 1887 – 3 July 1971) was a Spanish politician who served as the minister of interior in 1931 being the first politician to hold the post in the Second Spanish Republic. He was the founder of the Conservative Republican Party.

== Early life and education ==
Miguel Maura was born in Madrid on 13 December 1887. His father was Antonio Maura who was among the Prime Ministers of Spain. His elder brother, Gabriel, also was a politician.

Miguel Maura received a degree in law.

== Career ==
Following his graduation Maura worked at the city council in Madrid. Then he was elected as a member of the parliament in 1916 and 1919 representing the province of Alicante. In April 1931 he was made a member of the Republican Revolutionary Committee and also, was appointed minister of interior in the provisional government. Maura and the Prime Minister Niceto Alcalá-Zamora resigned from the office on 14 October that year.

In 1932, he founded a conservative political party, the Conservative Republican Party.

== Later years and death ==
Maura left Spain after the civil war and went into exile in Paris. While in exile he met José Antonio de Sangróniz who was serving as the representative of the Spanish ruler, Francisco Franco, to form a transitional government of national unity in 1944. However, his initiative was not fruitful.

He died in Zaragoza on 3 June 1971.

== See also ==
- Ministry of the Interior (Spain)
