= Fernanda Frances Arribas =

Spanish artist (1862–1939)

- Born: 26 February 1862; Valencia, Spain
- Died: 21 April 1939 (aged 77); Madrid, Spain
- Notable work: Jarrón de lilas (tr. Vase of lilacs)
- Style: Still life
- Spouse: José Cayetano Vallcorba (m. 1892)

Fernanda Frances Arribas (1862−1939) was a Spanish painter. She is known for still lifes and flower paintings. She taught at the Escuela de Artes y Oficinos in Madrid, and at the Escuela del Hogar in Madrid.

== Biography ==
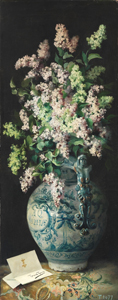
Jarrón de lilas by Fernanda Frances Arribas c. 1890

Arribas was born in Valencia, Spain on 26 February 1862. She was taught by her father, Plácido Francés y Pascual. She married the landscape painter José Cayetano Vallcorba.

She taught at the Escuela de Artes y Oficinos in Madrid, and at the Escuela del Hogar in Madrid.

She exhibited regularly at the Exposiciones Nacionales de Bellas Artes where she won a mención honorífica in 1887 and a tercera medalla in 1890, and a segunda medalla in 1897. Arribas exhibited her work at the Palace of Fine Arts and The Woman's Building at the 1893 World's Columbian Exposition in Chicago, Illinois and she also exhibited at the Exposition Universelle in 1889.

In 1902 she was the first woman to participate in a Pinelo exhibition.

She died in Madrid, Spain on 21 April 1939. Her painting Jarrón de lilas is in the Museo del Prado.
