= Conservative Republican Party (Spain) =

Conservative Republican Party Partido Republicano Conservador
- Abbreviation: PRC, CPR
- Leader: Miguel Maura
- Founder: Miguel Maura
- Founded: January 1932; 94 years ago
- Dissolved: 1936; 90 years ago
- Split from: Liberal Republican Right
- Ideology: Conservatism; Republicanism
- Political position: Centre-right to right-wing
- Colours: Blue

The Conservative Republican Party (Partido Republicano Conservador, PRC) was a Spanish political party created in January 1932 by Miguel Maura after breaking with one of the new Republic’s main conservative parties, the Liberal Republican Right. It disappeared when the Spanish Civil War broke out in 1936.

== History ==
Miguel Maura wanted to lead a party dedicated to keeping the founding principle of the Liberal Republican Right alive: instilling the conservative masses of the new Republic with secular, Western-style right-wing ideals, free from the influence of the Roman Catholic Church. Its foundation was widely welcomed by many right-leaning political sectors and moderate newspapers, and soon after, many local party committees were created, with Maura, a brilliant orator in the Spanish Congress of Deputies, as their reference.

Despite this success and the fact that Maura acted as the Leader of the Opposition against Manuel Azaña’s government, the party obtained poor results in the 1933 election, winning only 17 seats – less than the Liberal Republican Right did in 1931. Instead of supporting the Conservative Republicans, most right-wing voters elected candidates of the Spanish Confederation of Autonomous Right-wing Groups (CEDA), a Catholic and corporatist party.

Soon, Maura’s approach to politics, based on his personal charisma, and the growth of the CEDA brought the party to its representation ceiling; it ran few candidates in the 1936 election and only got three seats. Their last significant political action was running candidates for electors in the presidential election that took place in April of that year. By doing so, they were the only conservative party, along with the nationalist Catalan Regionalist League, not to boycott the process. Their votes went to the only candidate with chances to win, Manuel Azaña, and the party disbanded soon thereafter as the Spanish Civil War started.

== Sources ==
- Añigo Fernández, Luis (2000). "El republicanismo conservador en la España de los años treinta". Revista de Estudios Políticos (110): 281–296.
