= Parque del Retiro =

Park in Ponce, Puerto Rico

Coordinates: 18°00′36.61″N 66°37′35.44″W

Parque del Retiro (Retirement Park)
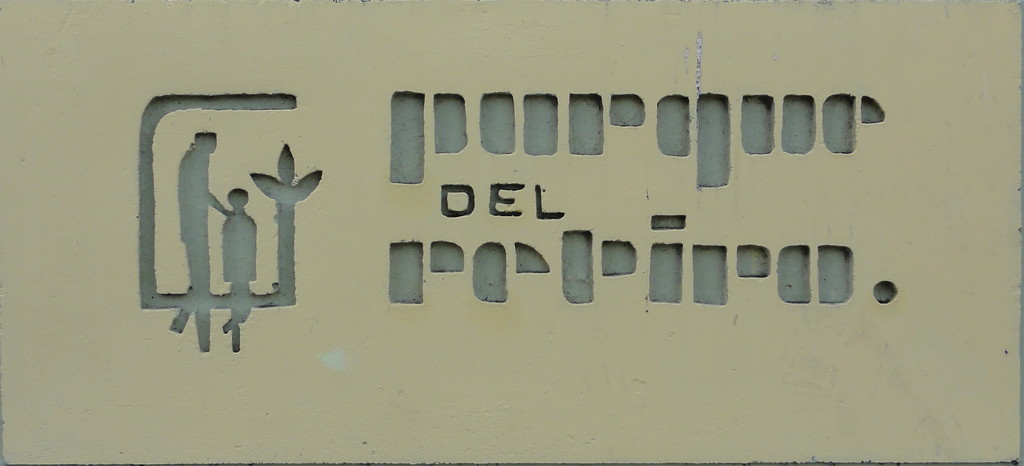
- Logo of Parque del Retiro in Barrio Canas Urbano
- Interactive map of Parque del Retiro (Retirement Park)
- Type: Passive park
- Location: PR-123/Villa Street, Clausells sector, Barrio Canas Urbano, in Ponce, Puerto Rico
- Area: approx 4 cuerdas
- Created: 1980
- Operator: Autonomous Municipality of Ponce
- Status: Open Monday through Friday, 8am to 4:30pm

Parque del Retiro (English: Retirement Park) is the only senior citizens-oriented passive park in Ponce, Puerto Rico. It is located in barrio Canas Urbano. The park commemorated its 30th anniversary on 11 February 2010. It has a "steady attendance" of some 70 senior citizens. The park's oldest member is 91 years old. The park's managing ranger is Roberto Castro Franceschi.

== Location ==
The park is located on Villa street, between the Clausells and Baldorioty sectors of barrio Canas Urbano. The area is a mixed residential/commercial area on urban route PR-123. The park sits on an underprivileged sector of the city. The park is a self-contained non-profit entity. It is managed by the Ponce municipal government. It serves exclusively the City’s elderly population. The park is set "in a calming setting among lush mahogany, avocado, almond, lemon and flamboyán trees."

== History ==
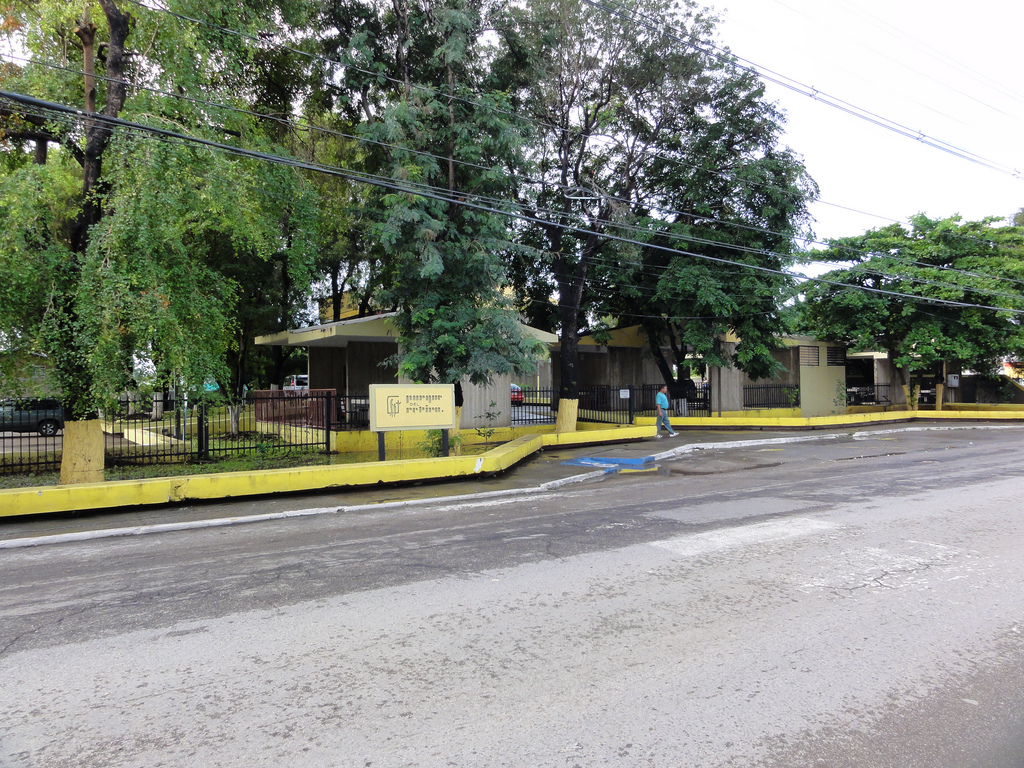
Parque del Retiro on Calle Villa in Barrio Canas

In the late 1960s, the park was an empty city lot with many tall trees, very few bushes and shrubbery, and some open semi-grassy areas. Senior citizens of the area gravitated to the empty lot in the afternoons for its comfortable shade and for the inevitable conversations with other retired neighborhood seniors. With time, the senior made their way to the park with scrap chairs to make their longer stays more comfortable. It wasn't long before a table or two also found their way there, making it possible for the retired seniors to share in a game of domino. Soon the domino games became a regular feature of the daily gatherings. It was not long before the still-empty government lot had been "appropriated" by the seniors for their daily gatherings and domino games. The daily games gathered popularity and after a few years domino tournaments also took place. At this time the park was locally known as Las Vegas, "for its popular open-air kiosks with 12 game tables".

In view of the need for a clean and safe gathering place for the seniors of the area, the city, fixed the "park", built permanently set poured concrete tables and chairs, added flower gardens with walkways as well as restroom facilities. The park was then inaugurated in 1980, under the administration of mayor José G. Tormos Vega.

== A senior citizens center ==
The park also serves as the center for an array of community services oriented towards the senior citizens community. Within the park are the offices of the non-profit organization running the park. It has an eight-member staff including a social worker, a nurse, and a recreation leader.

Some of the free services the park offers are:

- Health clinics with physicians
- Escorted transportation to medical appointments
- Especially adapted exercises and physical education programs, including strolls at other passive city parks
- Guided cultural day tours to out-of-town attractions
- Summer weekend-long outings to island beaches
- Annual Christmas, Thanksgiving, Holy Week, Mother's and Father's Day celebrations.
- Social exchange trips to other similar groups in the island
- Domino tournaments area schoolchildren
- Talent shows and educational lectures oriented to the senior citizen population.

== Reforestation effort ==
In November 2009, Parque del Retiro was selected for green reforestation effort sponsored by Telemundo, Doral Bank and the Department of Natural and Environmental Resources of the Commonwealth of Puerto Rico.
