= Party of the Democratic Centre (Spain) =

Party of the Democratic Centre Partido del Centro Democrático
- Leader: Manuel Portela Valladares
- Founded: January 28, 1936
- Dissolved: April 1, 1939 (Note: On 13 September 1936 the rebel Junta de Defensa Nacional issued a decree outlawing all political parties 'contrary' to the movimiento nacional. On 1 April 1939 the last Republican forces in Spain surrendered. This left the government of Francisco Franco—the successor to the Junta de Defensa Nacional—as the sole legally recognised, non-exile Spanish government.)
- Ideology: Anti-communism; Centrism; Republicanism
- Political position: Centre
- Congress of Deputies (1936): 18 / 473

The Party of the Democratic Centre (Spanish: Partido del Centro Democrático, PCD) was a centrist political party active in the Second Spanish Republic.

== History ==
The origins of the PCD can be traced back to a note issued to the press on 31 December 1935. The note attempted to justify the previous day's cabinet reshuffle, carried out by Prime Minister Manuel Portela Valladares with the support of President Niceto Alcalá-Zamora, by describing it as 'a necessary effort to create a Republican center'. A number of those appointed to Portela's new cabinet would go on to join the PCD. The party's manifesto, published on January 28, 1936, 'rejected both "civil war" and "red revolution"' whilst 'stressing constitutional process, national unity and progress.'.

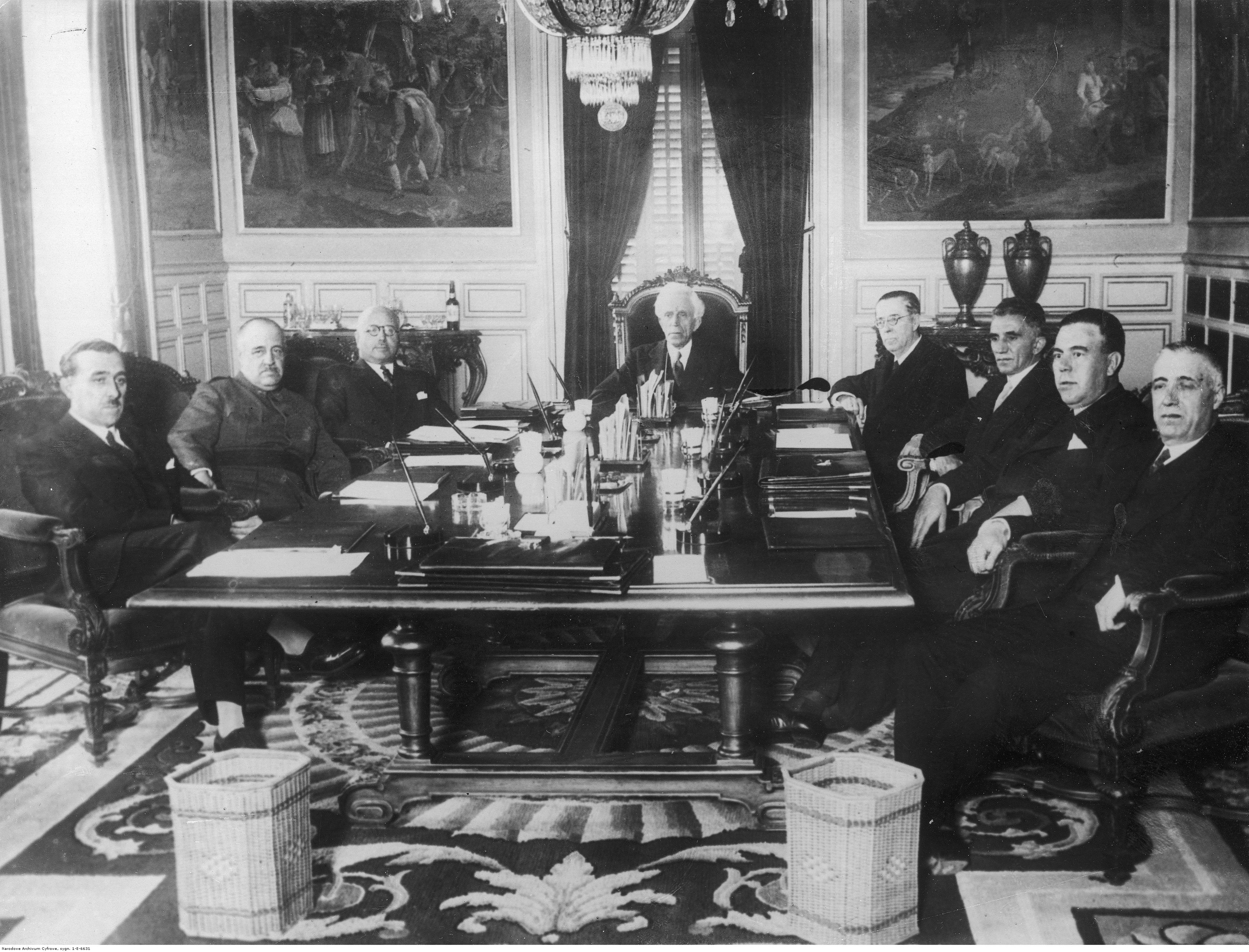
Manuel Portela Valladares' cabinet on 30 December 1935.

In the run-up to the 1936 Spanish general elections, Portela and the PCD initially tried to forge an alliance with the political left. Portela's offer was 'roundly rejected' in all provinces but Lugo and Alicante, and he instead turned to the political right. In total 89 PCD candidates stood for election in 1936. However, by the time the elections took place this number had fallen to 78 - the result of numerous defections; with only 23 securing places on 'broader center-right coalition tickets'. The PCD's failure to make a breakthrough in the 1936 elections has been attributed to both Portela's attempt to try and rapidly build a new party ex nihilo in a period of increased radicalisation, and his failure to build the strong alliance with either the left or the right that he deemed necessary.

The PCD initially won 21 seats in the 1936 elections. This total later fell to 18 when elections in Cuenca and Granada were re-held in an attempt to mitigate the impact of acts of electoral fraud carried out by the political right. It has been alleged that Alcalá-Zamora pressured the comisión de actas, the committee for examining electoral validity, into approving the election of Portela in Pontevedra despite the existence of evidence of electoral malpractice in the city. The PCD's participation in government came to an end with the resignation of a 'terror-stricken' Portela on 19 February 1936.

Five members of the PCD were the only deputies to vote against the removal of Alcalá-Zamora as President of the Republic.
