= Emilio Sala (painter) =

Spanish painter (1850–1910)

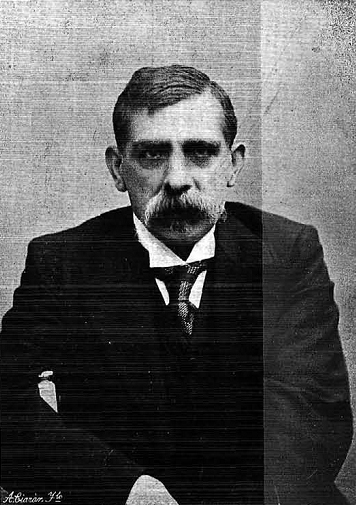
Emilio Sala; photograph by Kaulak (date unknown).

Emilio Sala y Francés (20 January 1850 – 14 April 1910) was a Spanish painter, primarily of female portraits.

== Biography ==
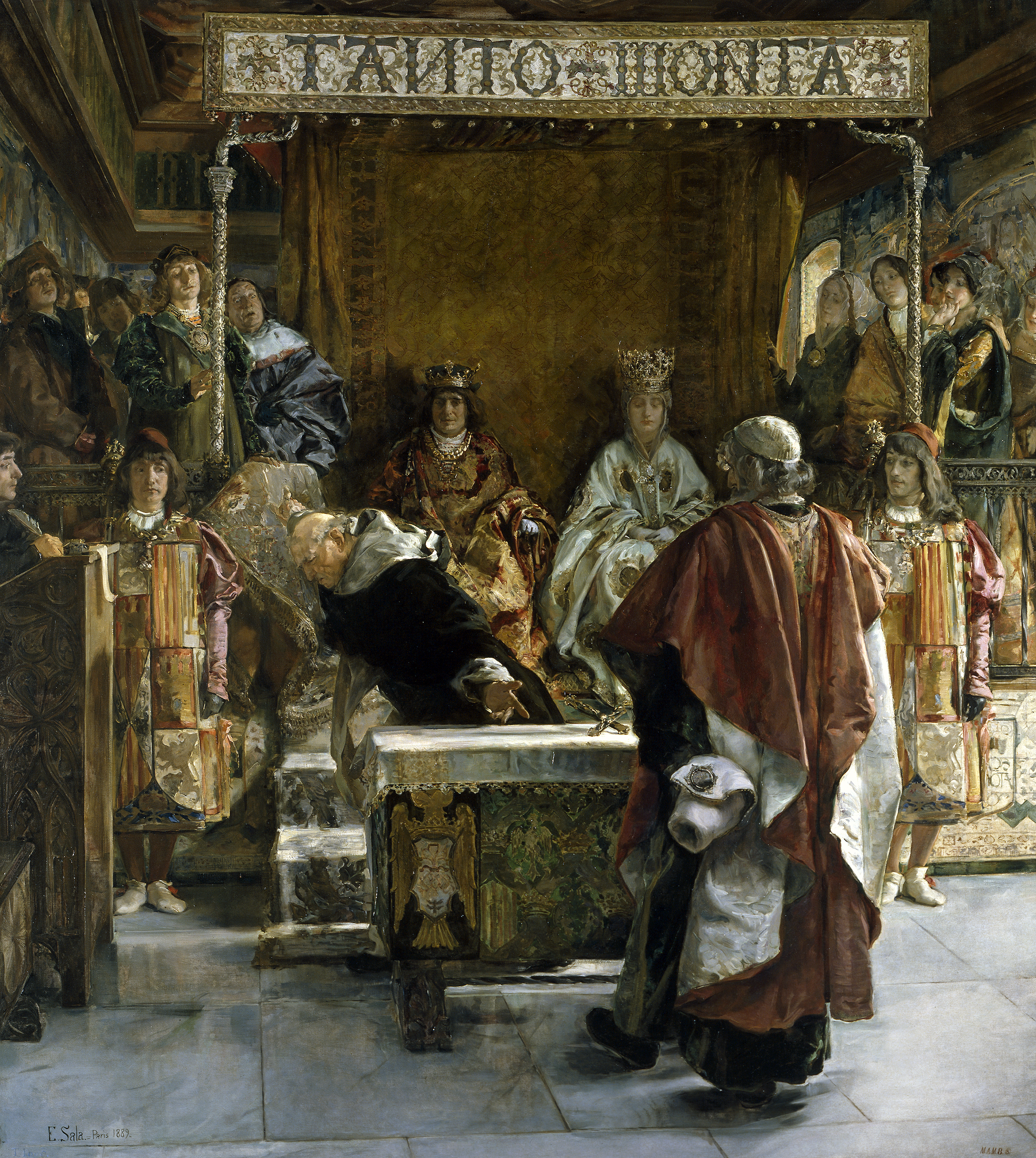
Expulsion of the Jews from Spain (1889) depicting an imagined court scene leading to the Alhambra Decree of 1492.

He was born in Alcoy to a family of merchants. His first studies were at the Real Academia de Bellas Artes de San Carlos de Valencia with Plácido Francés y Pascual, his cousin. In 1871, he had his first public showing at the National Exhibition of Fine Arts and won First Prize there in 1878. He also opened a studio in Madrid and took part in decorating the Anglada and Mazarredo palaces, the ceilings of the Café de Fornos (now gone), and the Cantina Americana.

In 1885, after failing to receive a Professorship at the "School of Arts and Crafts", he applied for and received a fellowship to study at the Spanish Academy in Rome but, two years later, was granted leave to study in Paris instead. At the Exposition Universelle (1889) he presented his now-famous painting Expulsion of the Jews from Spain, only to discover that the French public apparently no longer appreciated historical works, so he presented it in Spain, where it was better received. In 1890, perhaps as a result of this experience, he abandoned that subject in favor of genre scenes, landscapes, and illustrating.

In 1896, he returned to Spain, where he married and reopened his studio. Many of his works appeared in the magazine Blanco y Negro. He also illustrated some of the Episodios Nacionales of Benito Pérez Galdós. and created decorations for the palace of the Infanta Isabella, which were highly praised. Overall, however, his portraits stand out.

In 1906, he once again applied for an academic position, this time at the Escuela de Bellas Artes de San Fernando, and was rejected in favor of Ramón Menéndez Pidal. As compensation, the school created a chair in the "Theory and Esthetics of Color" especially for him. He held that post until his death, from heart failure, in 1910 in Madrid. Among his many honors are the Grand Cross of the Order of Isabel the Catholic and the Cross of the Order of St. Michael (Bavaria), presented at an exhibition in Munich in 1885.

== Other selected paintings ==
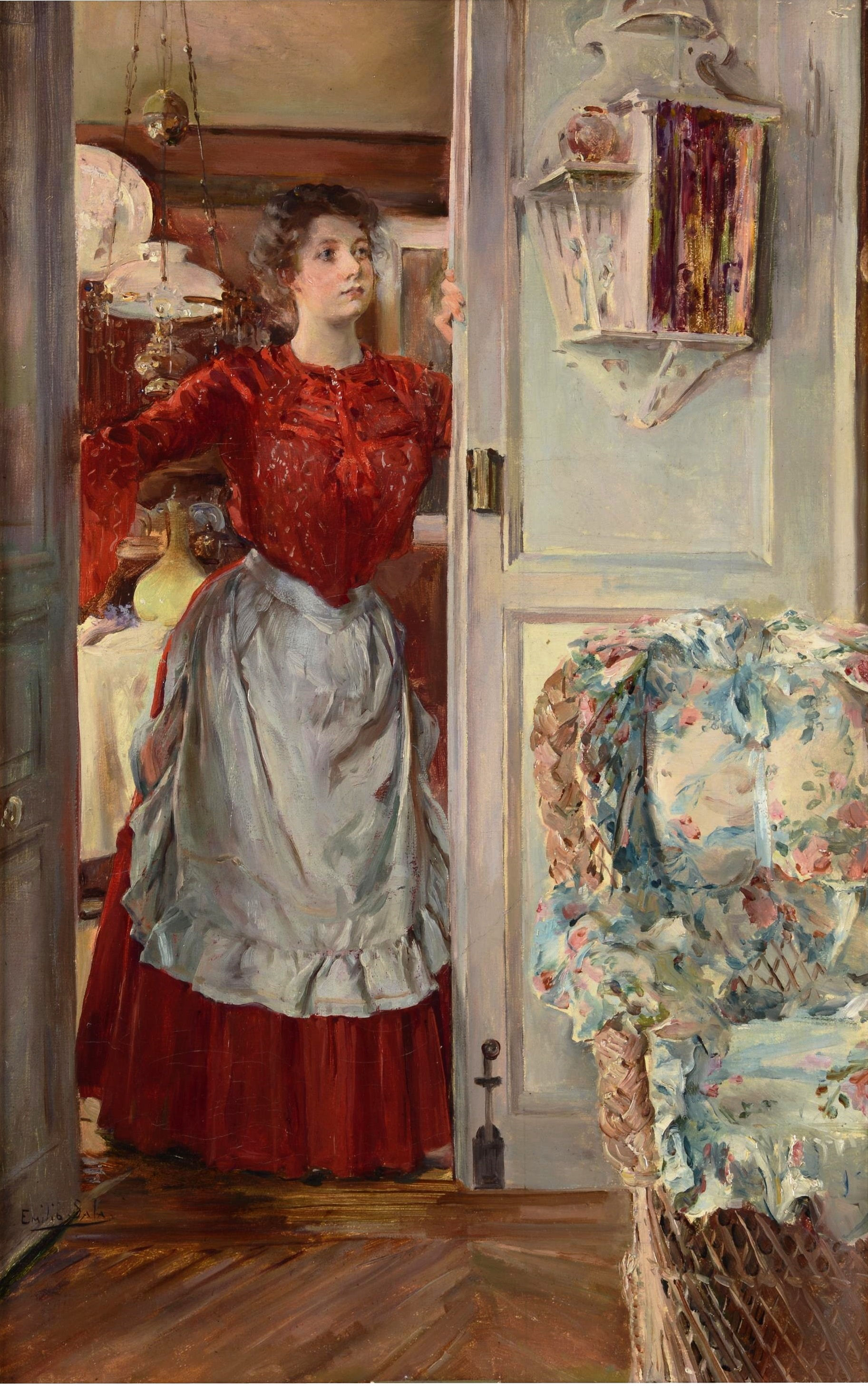
Young Lady in the Doorway (c.1895)

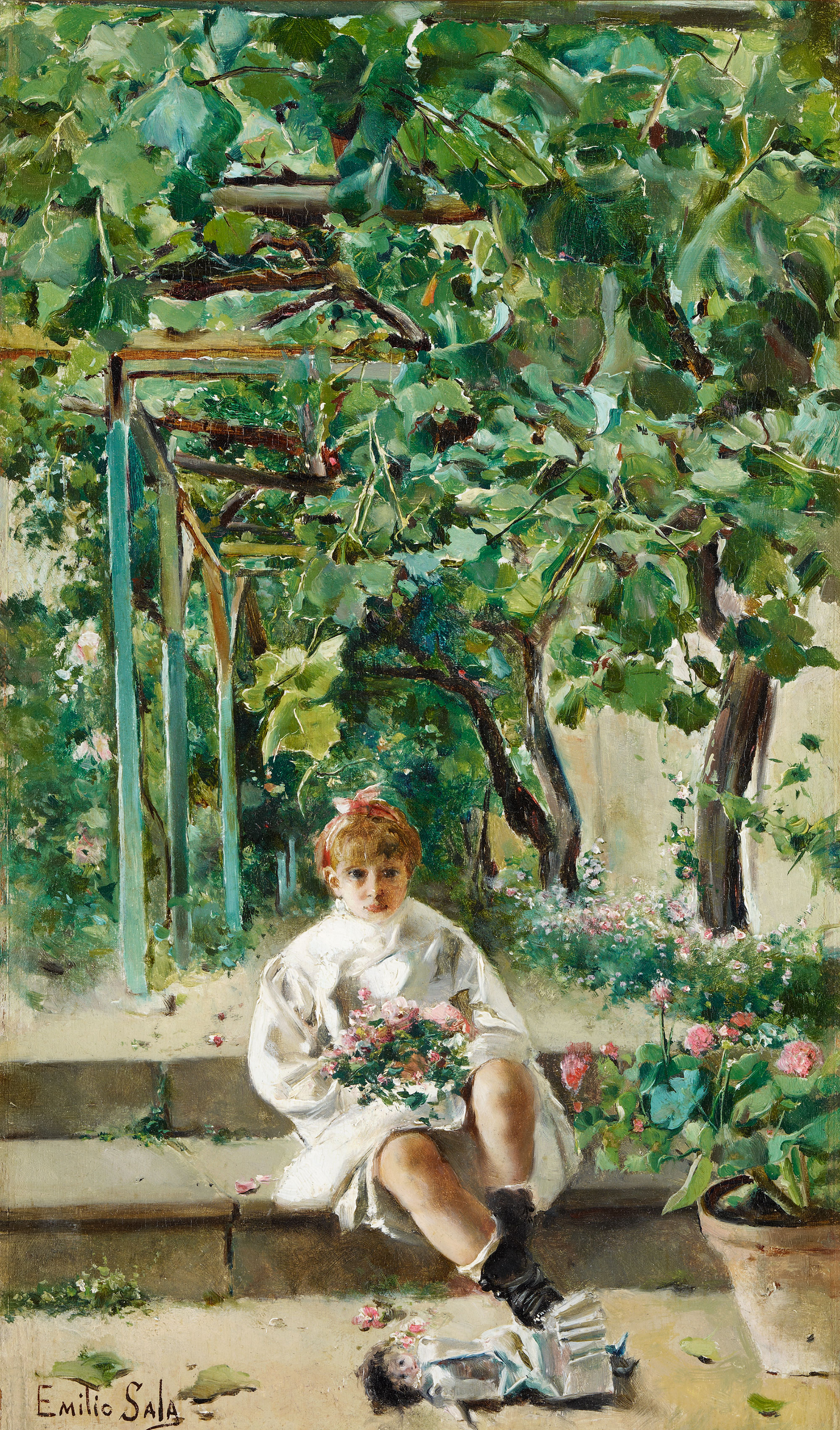
The Abandoned Doll

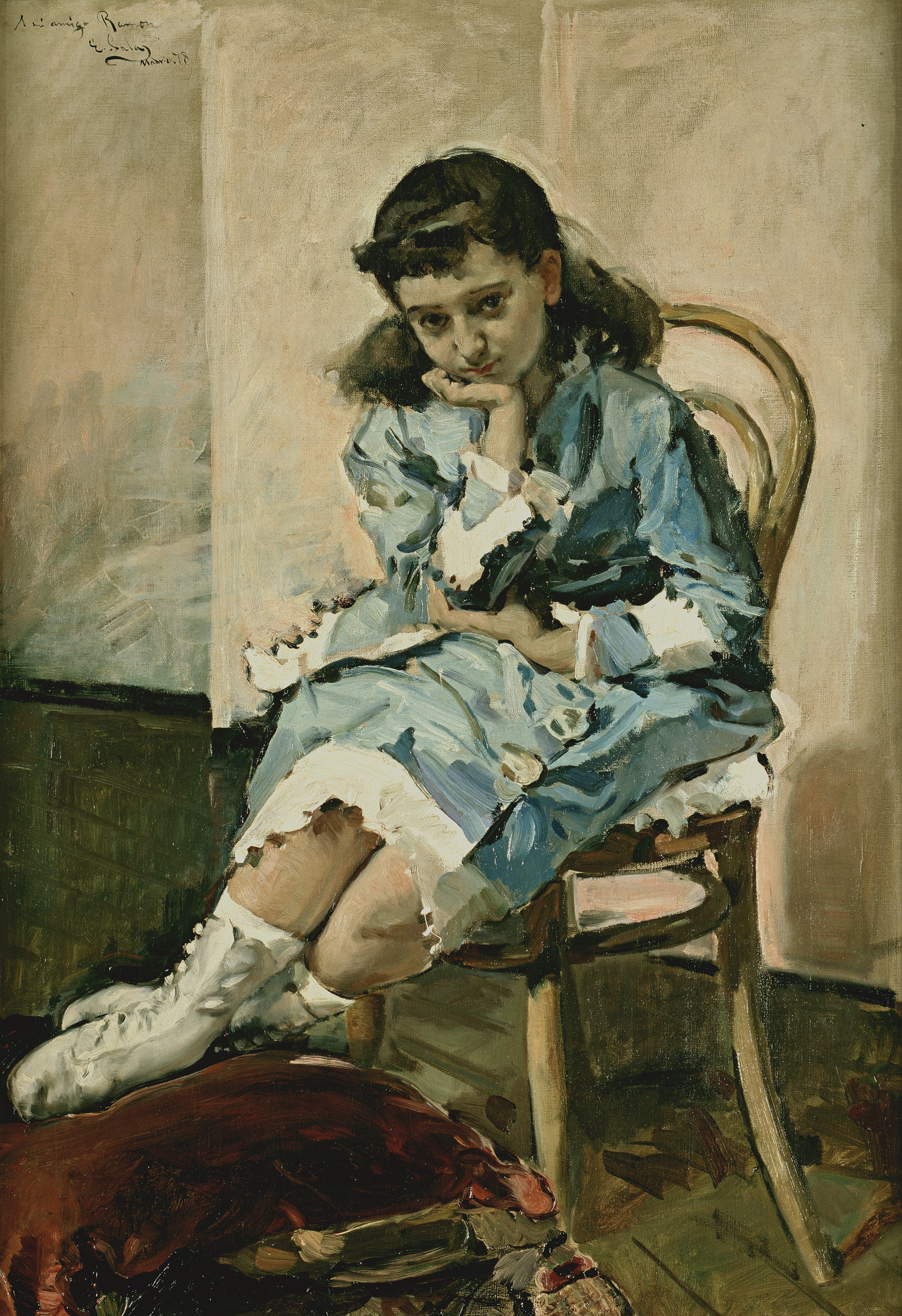
Portrait of María Guerrero (1878)

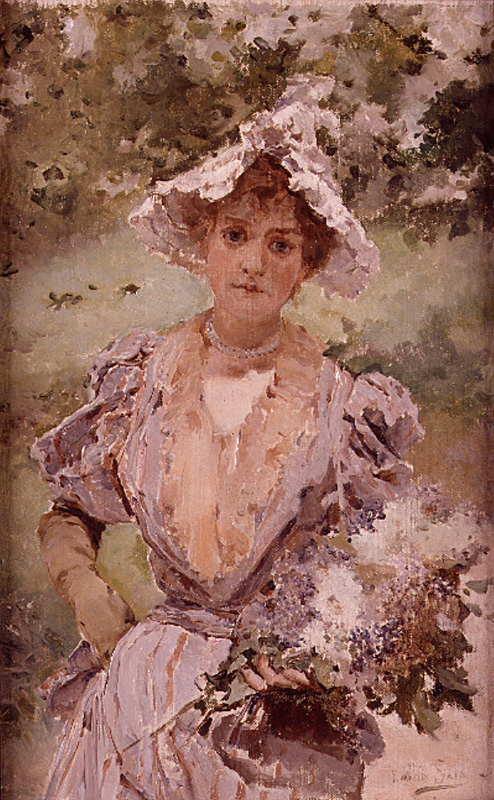
Woman with Flowers

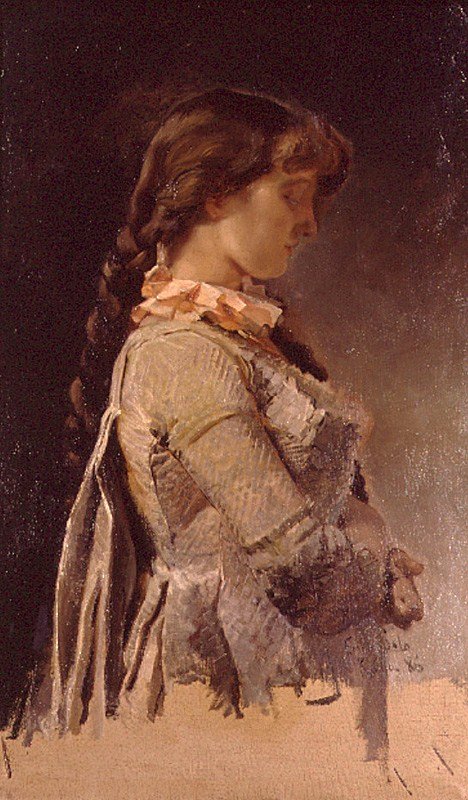
Portrait of a
young girl (1886)

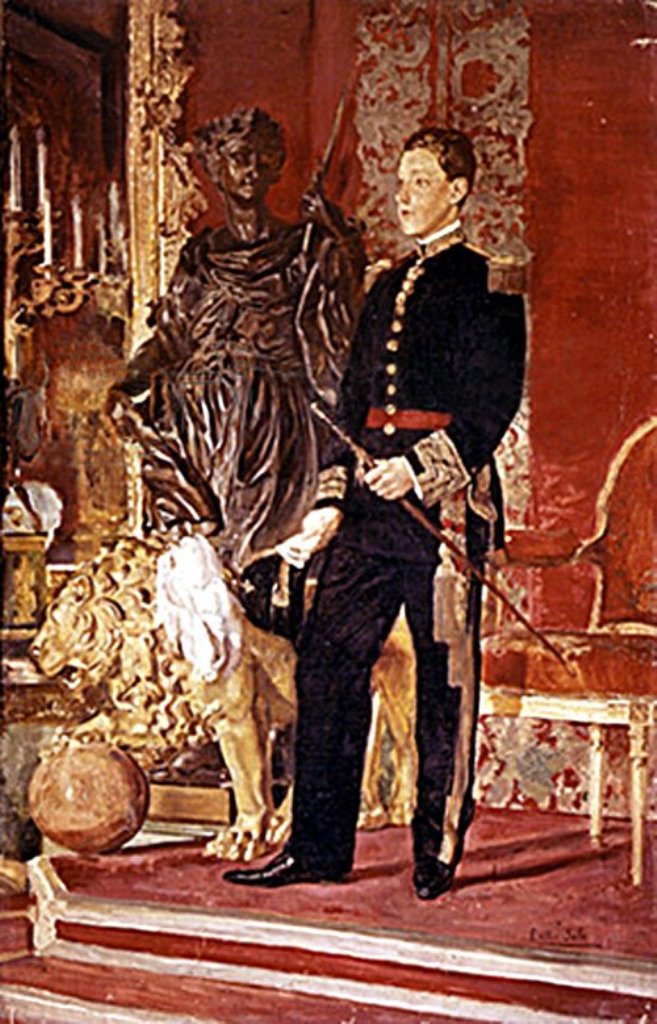
Portrait of
King Alfonso XIII

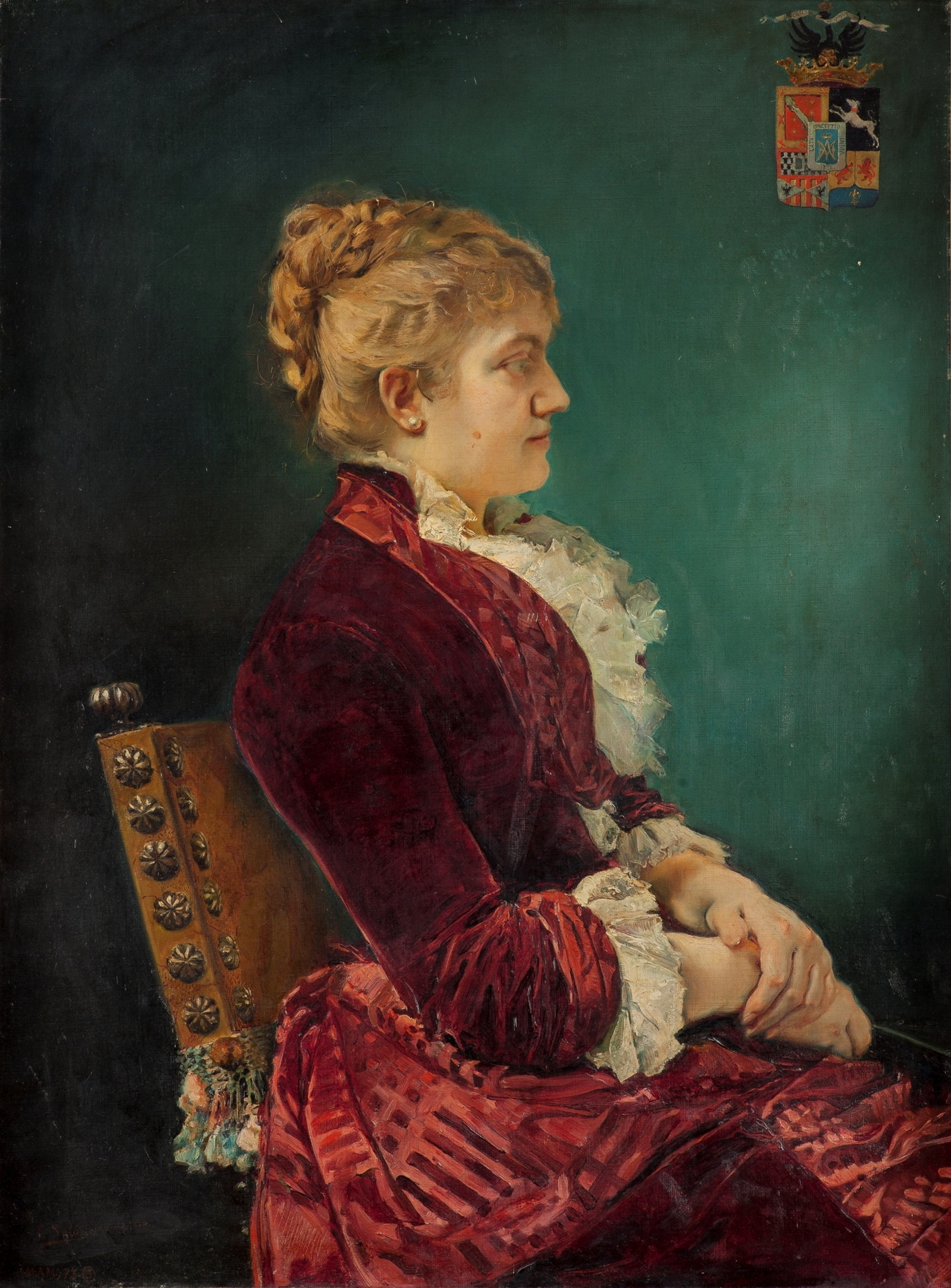
María de las Mercedes de Alcázar y Nero Vera de Aragón, marquise of Coquilla (1880)

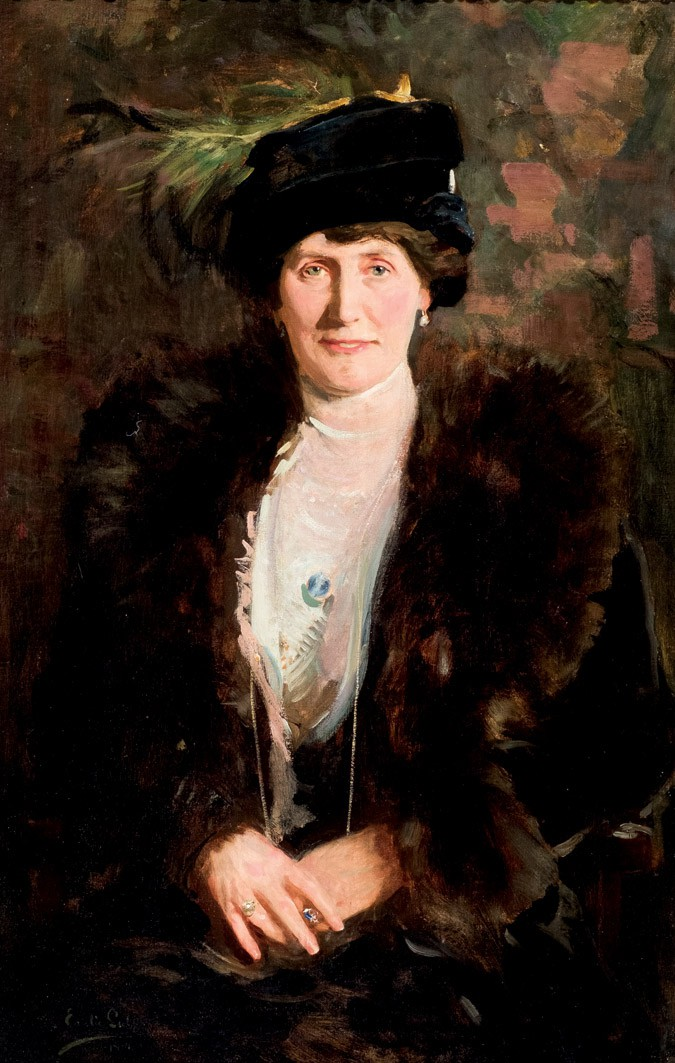
Portrait of a Lady (1910)
