= Artemio Precioso Ugarte =

Spanish economist and environmentalist

Artemio Precioso Ugarte (1917 - August 15, 2007) was a Spanish economist and environmentalist.

He founded the Socio-ecological Research Center to educate young scholars in environmental economics. He co-founded Greenpeace Spain and was its honorary president from 2004.

== Biography ==
The son of writer Artemio Precioso, he was born in Hellín, Albacete, in 1917. He joined the Communist Party of Spain (PCE) in 1937.

During the Spanish Civil War, he fought on the Republican side and served in the People's Army of the Republic. In April 1938, he was appointed commander of the 208th Mixed Brigade, which fought on the Levant front. He later took command of the 206th Mixed Brigade, an elite combat unit. On 3 March 1939, an armed uprising broke out at the naval base in Cartagena. Initially anti-communist in character, it soon became aligned with the Francoist cause. Precioso Ugarte was sent to the naval base with the 206th Mixed Brigade, where he quickly put down the uprising, although he was unable to prevent the Republican fleet from escaping.

After the end of the Spanish Civil War, he went into exile and settled in the Soviet Union, where he studied at the Frunze Military Academy. He later lived in Yugoslavia, where he served under Manuel Tagüeña. Following the Tito–Stalin split, he was transferred to Czechoslovakia with his family. There, he earned a doctorate in macroeconomics and became a professor of macroeconomics at Charles University. He returned to Spain in the 1970s and founded the Center for Socio-Ecological Studies, which trained young researchers in environmental economics. He also served as Greenpeace Spain's secretary general and, from 2004, as its honorary president. He received the National Extraordinary Environmental Award and wrote numerous studies on ecology and economics. He died in Madrid on 15 August 2007.

== Legacy ==
Greenpeace Spain presents an annual award in his name.
