= Manuel Portela Valladares =

Spanish politician (1867–1952)

The Most Excellent Manuel Portela OIC
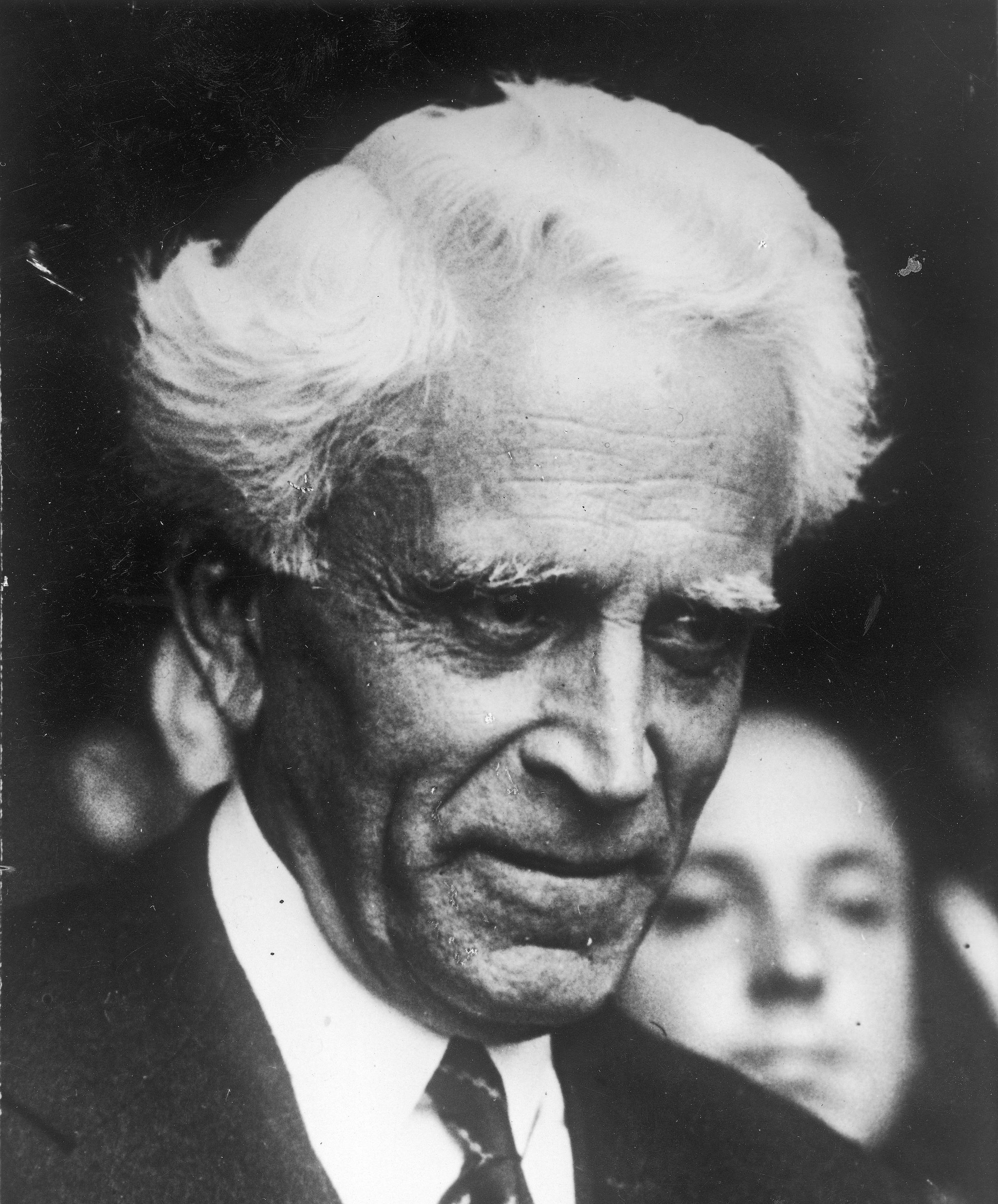

Prime Minister of Spain
- In office 14 December 1935 – 19 February 1936
- President: Niceto Alcala-Zamora
- Preceded by: Joaquín Chapaprieta
- Succeeded by: Manuel Azaña

Prosecutor of the Supreme Court
- In office 7 October 1912 – 17 March 1913
- Prime Minister: Manuel García Prieto; Álvaro de Figueroa
- Preceded by: Andrés Tornos y Alonso
- Succeeded by: Martín Rosales y Martel

Personal details
- Born: 31 January 1867 Pontevedra, Spain
- Died: 29 April 1952 (aged 85) Bandol, France
- Party: Party of the Democratic Centre
- Other political affiliations: Liberal

Manuel Portela y Valladares (Pontevedra, 31 January 1867 – Bandol, Provence-Alpes-Côte d'Azur, France 29 April 1952) was a Spanish political figure during the Second Spanish Republic. He served as Prosecutor of the Supreme Court between 1912 and 1913.

A member of the Liberal Party, he served as civil governor of Barcelona in 1910 and 1923, and as Minister of Promotion in September 1923. After the socialist revolution against the republican government in October 1934, Alejandro Lerroux named him Minister of the Interior in 1935 and named Prime Minister by Niceto Alcalá-Zamora on 14 December 1935. He formed two governments prior to the elections of 16 February 1936 where he attempted to stabilise the center ground political parties. In the end, the leftist party, Popular Front won. He went into exile at the beginning of the Spanish Civil War, but eventually returned to Spain in 1937 to attend the Republican Courts plenary session held in Valencia. Then he returned to France and continued supporting the Spanish Republic in exile, but when Second World War started he was arrested by Gestapo during the occupation of France by Nazi Germany and confined by the Vichy regime near Marseille. He died in France in 1952.

== See also ==
- List of prime ministers of Spain
- Second biennium of the Second Spanish Republic
