= 1936 Spanish general election =

- 16 February 1936 (first round); 4 March 1936 (second round); 3 May 1936 (second round, partial re-run)

All 473 seats of the Congress of Deputies 237 seats needed for a majority
- Turnout: 72.95%
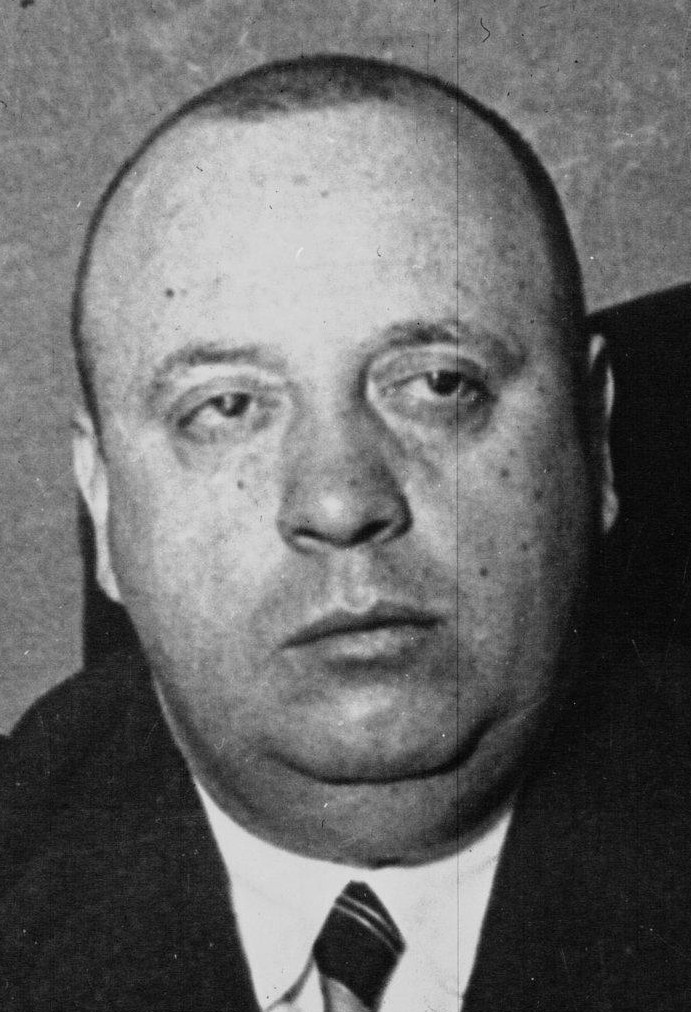

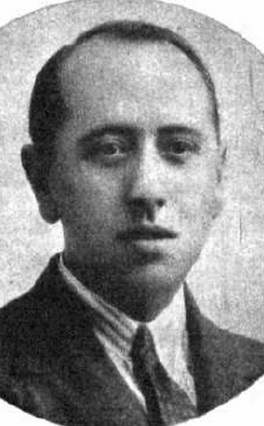

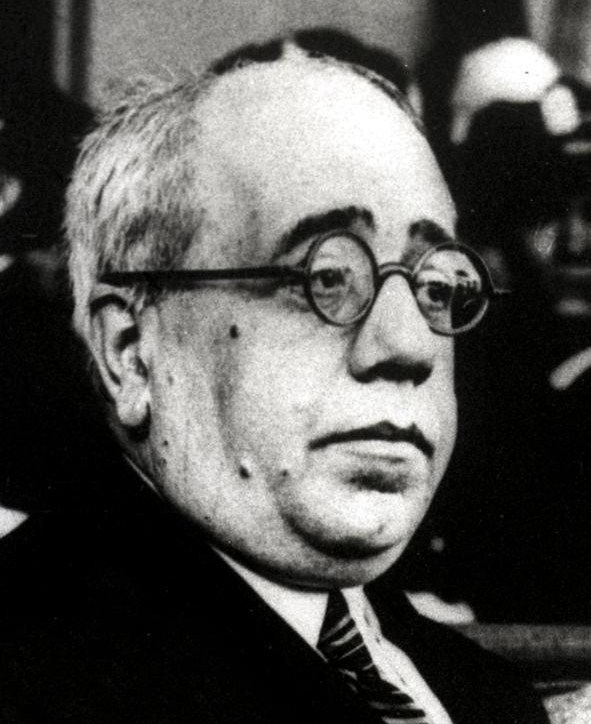

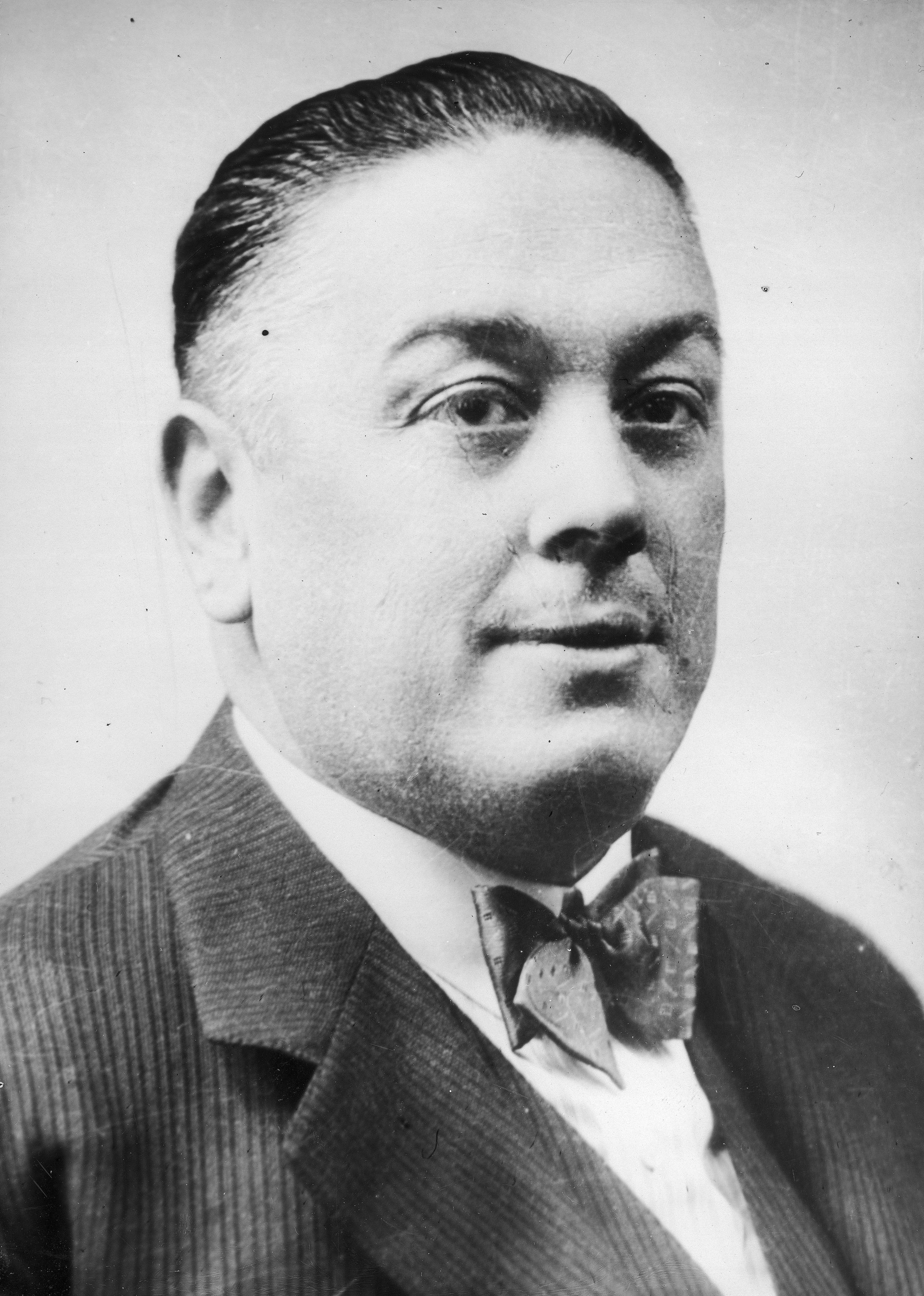

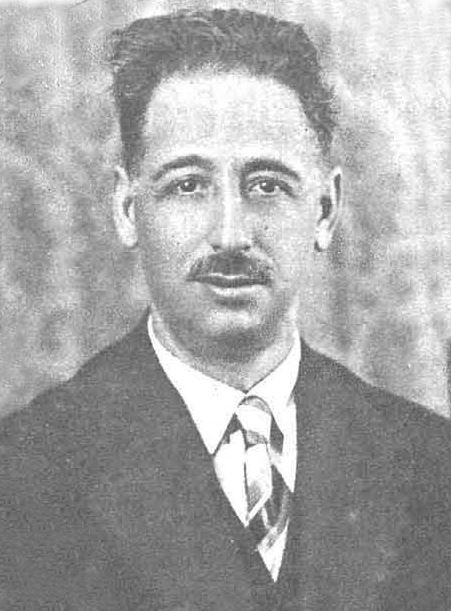

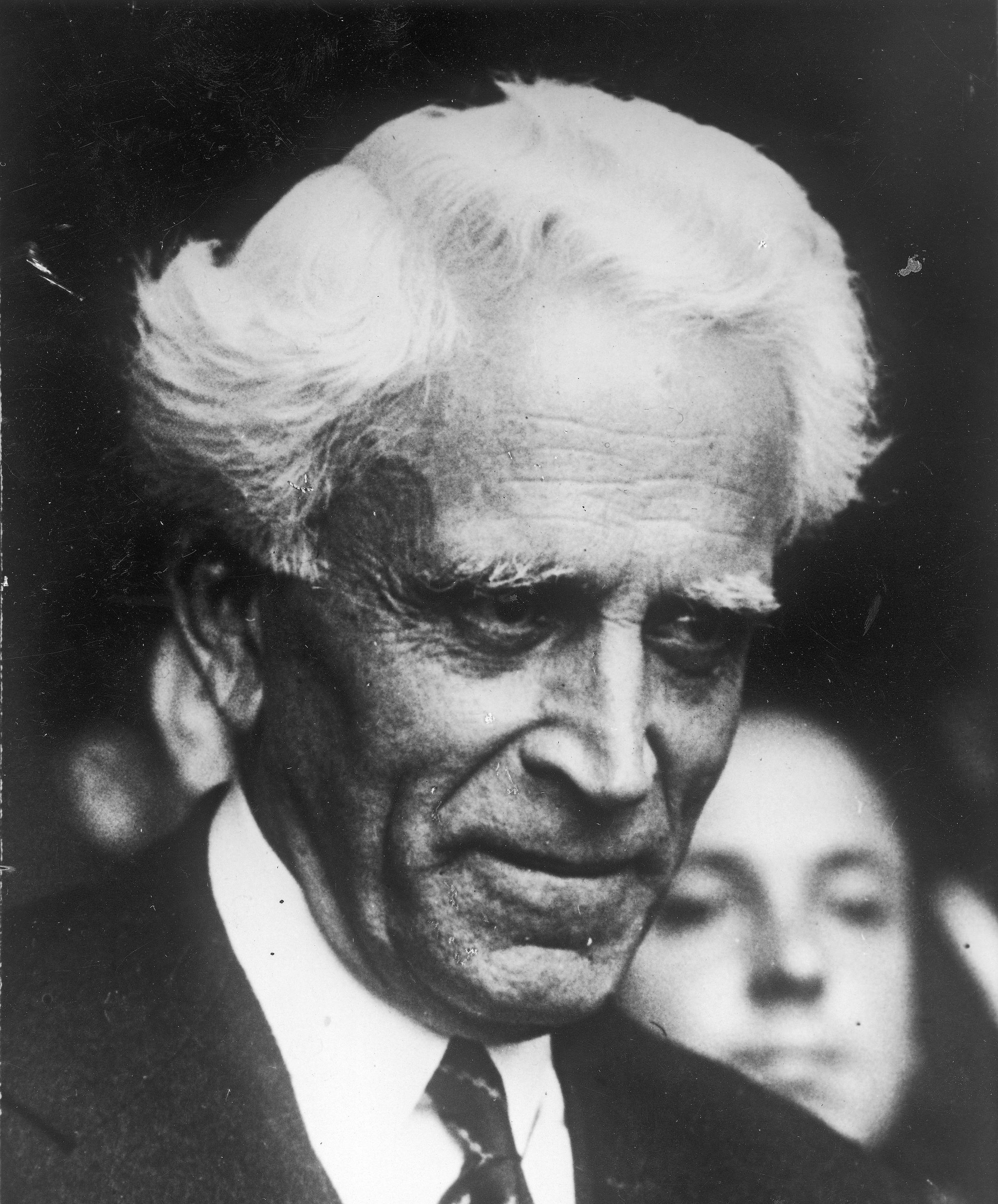
	First party	Second party	Third party
Leader	Indalecio Prieto	José María Gil-Robles	Manuel Azaña
Party	PSOE	CEDA	IR
Alliance	Popular Front	National Contrarrevolutionary Front and Front Català d'Ordre	Popular Front
Leader since	1935	4 March 1933	3 April 1934
Leader's seat	Vizcaya-capital	Salamanca	Madrid-capital
Last election	59 seats	115 seats	14 seats (Note: compared to the results of the Republican Action (5 seats), the Galician Republican Party (6 seats) and the Independent Radical Socialist Republican Party (3 seats) in 1933, who merged to form IR in 1934)
Seats won	99	88	87
Seat change	▲40	▼27	▲73
	Fourth party	Fifth party	Sixth party
Leader	Diego Martínez Barrio	Lluís Companys	Manuel Portela
Party	Republican Union	Republican Left of Catalonia	Party of the Democratic Centre
Alliance	Popular Front	Left Front of Catalonia	N/A
Leader since	1934	1932	1936
Leader's seat	Madrid-province	Barcelona-capital	Pontevedra
Last election	N/A	17	N/A
Seats won	37	21	17
Seat change	▲37	▲4	▲17
Prime Minister before election
Manuel Portela Valladares (acting)
PCD
Prime Minister after election
Manuel Azaña
IR

Legislative elections were held in Spain on 16 February 1936. At stake were all 473 seats in the unicameral Cortes Generales. The winners of the 1936 elections were the Popular Front, a left-wing coalition of the Spanish Socialist Workers' Party (PSOE), Republican Left (Spain) (IR), Esquerra Republicana de Catalunya (ERC), Republican Union (UR), Communist Party of Spain (PCE), Acció Catalana (AC), and other parties. Their coalition commanded a narrow lead over the divided opposition in terms of the popular vote, but a significant lead over the main opposition party, Spanish Confederation of the Autonomous Right (CEDA), in terms of seats. The election had been prompted by a collapse of a government led by Alejandro Lerroux, and his Radical Republican Party. Manuel Azaña would replace Manuel Portela Valladares, caretaker, as prime minister.

The electoral process and the accuracy of the results have been historically disputed. Some of the causes of this controversy include the formation of a new cabinet before the results were clear, a lack of reliable electoral data, and the overestimation of election fraud in the official narrative that justified the coup d'état. The topic has been addressed in studies by authors such as Javier Tusell and Stanley G. Payne. A series of recent works has shifted the focus from the legitimacy of the election and the government to an analysis of the extent of irregularities. Whilst one of them suggests that the impact of fraud was higher than previously estimated when including new election datasets, the other disputes their relevance in the election result.

The elections were the last of three legislative elections held during the Spanish Second Republic, coming three years after the 1933 general election which had brought the first of Lerroux's governments to power. The uncontested victory of the political left in the elections of 1936 triggered a wave of collectivisation, mainly in the south and west of the Iberian Peninsula, engaging up to three million people, which has been identified as a key cause of the July coup. The right-wing military coup initiated by Gens. Sanjurjo and Franco, the ensuing civil war, and the establishment of Franco's dictatorship ultimately brought about the end of parliamentary democracy in Spain until the 1977 general election under King Juan Carlos I and Prime Minister Adolfo Suarez.

== Background ==
After the 1933 election, the Radical Republican Party (RRP) led a series of governments, with Alejandro Lerroux as a moderate Prime Minister. On 26 September 1934, the CEDA announced it would no longer support the RRP's minority government, which was replaced by a RRP cabinet, led by Lerroux once more, that included three members of the CEDA. The concession of posts to CEDA prompted the Asturian miners' strike of 1934, which turned into an armed rebellion. Some time later, Robles once again prompted a cabinet collapse, and five ministries of Lerroux's new government were conceded to CEDA, including Robles himself. Since the 1933 elections, farm workers' wages had been halved, and the military purged of republican members and reformed; those loyal to Robles had been promoted. However, since CEDA's entry into the government, no constitutional amendments were ever made; no budget was ever passed.

In 1935, Manuel Azaña and Indalecio Prieto worked to unify the left and combat its extreme elements in what would become the Popular Front; this included staging of large, popular rallies. Lerroux's Radical government collapsed after two significant scandals, the Straperlo and the Nombela affairs. However, president Niceto Alcalá Zamora did not allow the CEDA to form a government, and called elections. Zamora had become disenchanted with Robles's obvious desire to do away with the republic and establish a corporate state, and his air of pride. He was looking to strengthen a new center party in place of the Radicals, but the election system did not favour this. Manuel Portela Valladares was thus chosen to form a caretaker government in the meantime. The Republic had, as its opponents pointed out, faced twenty-six separate government crises. Portela failed to get the required support in the parliament to rule as a majority. The government was dissolved on 4 January; the date for elections would be 16 February.

As in the 1933 election, Spain was divided into multi-member constituencies; for example, Madrid was a single district electing 17 representatives. However, a voter could vote for fewer than that – in Madrid's case, 13. This favoured coalitions, as in Madrid in 1933 when the Socialists won 13 seats, and the right, with just 5,000 votes fewer, secured only the remaining four.

== Election ==
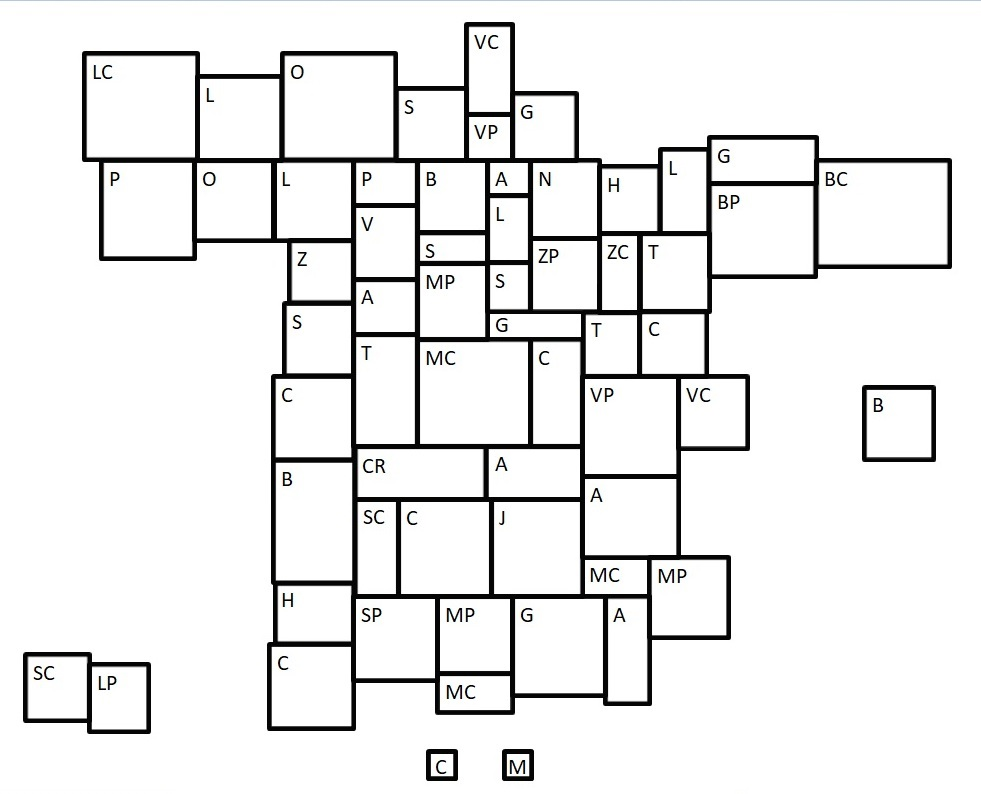
Electoral districts in proportion to number of mandates available, from Barcelona city (20) to Ceuta and Melilla (1 each)

Vatican Fascism offered you work and brought hunger; it offered you peace and brought five thousands tombs; it offered you order and raised a gallows. The Popular Front offers no more and no less than it will bring: Bread, Peace and Liberty!

— One election poster.

There was significant violence during the election campaign, most of which initiated by the political left, though a substantial minority was by the political right. In total, some thirty-seven people were killed in various incidents throughout the campaign, ten of which occurred on the election day itself. Certain press restrictions were lifted. The political right repeatedly warned of the risk of a 'red flag' – communism – over Spain; the Radical Republican Party, led by Lerroux, concentrated on besmirching the Centre Party. CEDA, which continued to be the main party of the political right, struggled to gain the support of the monarchists, but managed to. Posters, however, had a distinctly fascist appeal, showing leader Gil-Robles alongside various autocratic slogans and he allowed his followers to acclaim him with cries of "Jefe!" (Spanish for "Chief!") in an imitation of "Duce!" or "Führer!". Whilst few campaign promises were made, a return to autocratic government was implied. Funded by considerable donations from large landowners, industrialists and the Catholic Church – which had suffered under the previous Socialist administration – the Right printed millions of leaflets, promising a 'great Spain'. In terms of manifesto, the Popular Front proposed going back to the sort of reforms its previous administration had advocated, including important agrarian reforms, and reforms relating to strikes. It would also release political prisoners, including those from the Asturian rebellion (though this provoked the right), helping to secure the votes of the CNT and FAI, although as organisations they remained outside the growing Popular Front; the Popular Front had the support of votes from anarchists. The Communist Party campaigned under a series of revolutionary slogans; however, they were strongly supportive of the Popular Front government. "Vote Communist to save Spain from Marxism" was a Socialist joke at the time. Devoid of strong areas of working class support, already taken by syndicalism and anarchism, they concentrated on their position within the Popular Front. The election campaign was heated; the possibility of compromise had been destroyed by the left's Asturian rebellion and its cruel repression by the security forces. Both sides used apocalyptic language, declaring that if the other side won, civil war would follow.

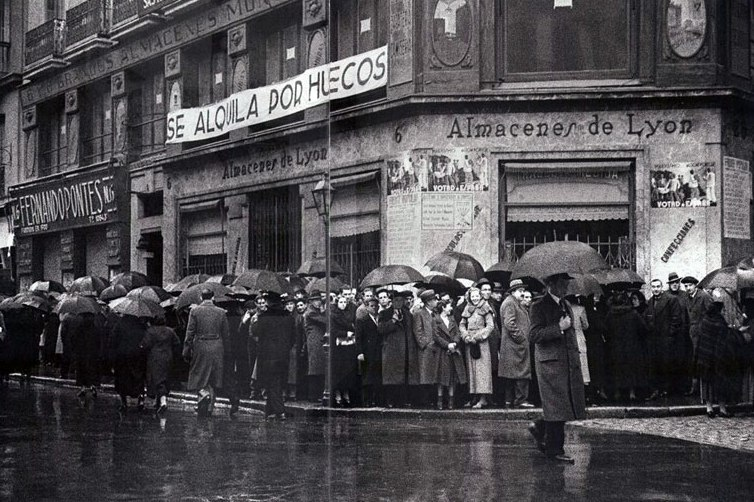
In Madrid the election day was rainy

34,000 members of the Civil Guards and 17,000 Assault Guards enforced security on election day, many freed from their regular posts by the carabineros. The balloting on 16 February ended with a draw between the left and right, with the center effectively obliterated. In six provinces left-wing groups apparently interfered with registrations or ballots, augmenting leftist results or invalidating rightist pluralities or majorities. In Galicia, in north-west Spain, and orchestrated by the incumbent government; there also, in A Coruña, by the political left. The voting in Granada was forcibly (and unfairly) dominated by the government. In some villages, the police stopped anyone not wearing a collar from voting. Wherever the Socialists were poorly organised, farm workers continued to vote how they were told by their bosses or caciques. Similarly, some right-wing voters were put off from voting in strongly socialist areas. However, such instances were comparatively rare. By the evening, it looked like the Popular Front might win and as a result in some cases crowds broke into prisons to free revolutionaries detained there.

== Outcome ==
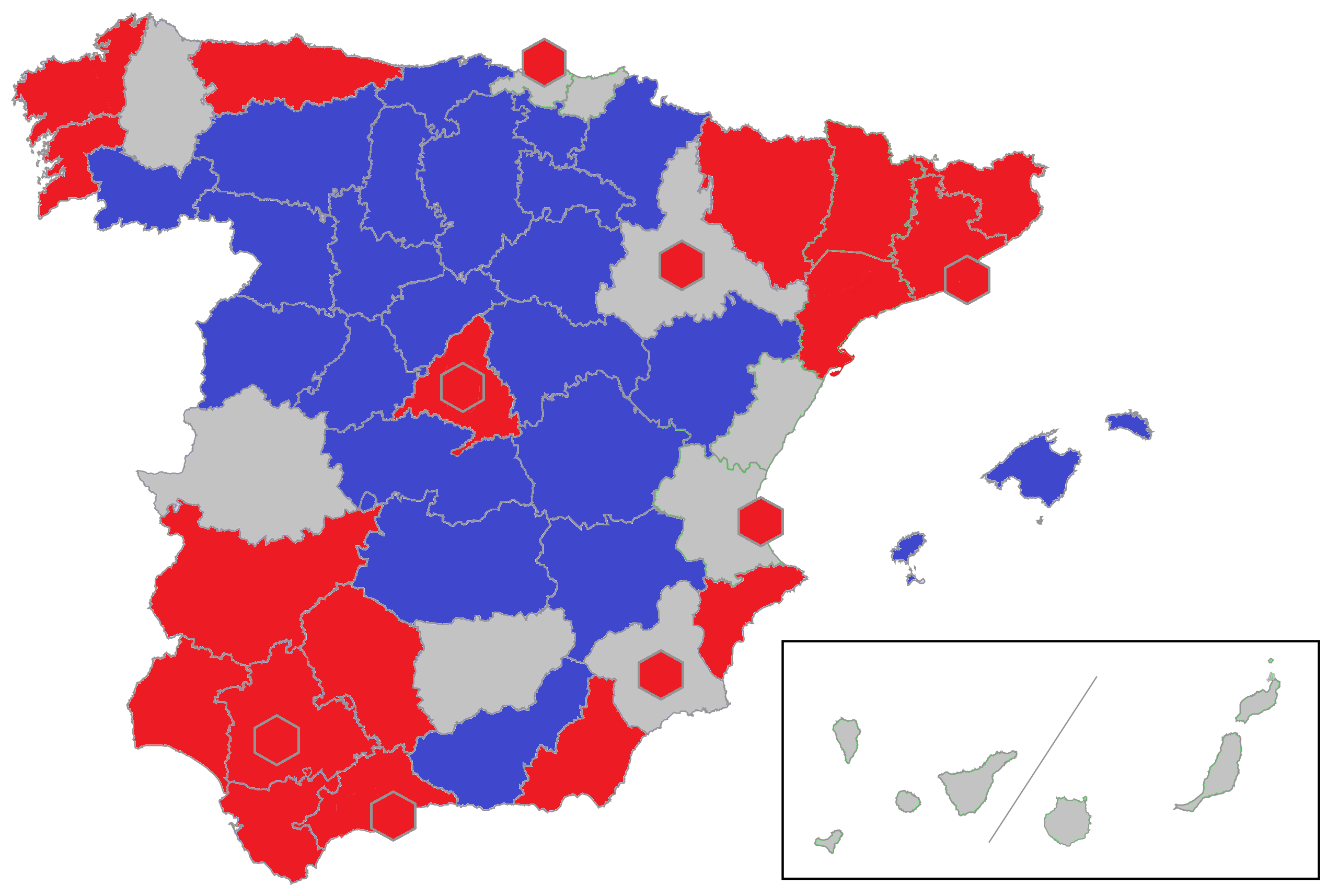
First round. RED: Popular Front at least 5% more votes than counter-revolutionary bloc, BLUE: the opposite, GREY: less than 5% difference or another list coming first

Just under 10 million people voted, with an abstention rate of 27-29 per cent, a level of apathy higher than might be suggested by the ongoing political violence. (Note: exact figures as to the number of voters, the number of electors and the turnout differ. The number of voters is quoted as 9.864.783 (Stanley G. Payne, Spain’s First Democracy, Madison 1993, ISBN 9780299136703, p. 274), 9.729.454 (Albert Carreras, Xavier Tafunell (eds.), Estadísticas históricas de España, vol. I, Bilbao 2005, ISBN 849651501X, p. 1098), 9.687.108 (Manuel Álvarez Tardío, Roberto Villa García, 1936, fraude y violencia en las elecciones del Frente Popular, Barcelona 2017, ISBN 9788467049466, p. 412) or 9.572.908 (Juan J. Linz, Jesús de Miguel, Hacia un análisis regional de las elecciones de 1936 en España, [in:] Revista Española de la Opinion Pública 48 (1977), p. 34. Internet sources might provide even different figures, e.g. 9.792.700 (HistoriaElectoral website). The number of electors, e.g. Spaniards entitled to vote, is given as 13.578.056 (Álvarez Tardío, Villa García 2017, p. 412), 13.553.710 (Payne 1993, p. 274) or 13.338.262 (Carreras, Tafunell 2005, p. 1098). Accordingly, the turnout rate which emerges from these figures might be calculated as 72,97% (Carreras, Tafunell 2005, p. 1098), 72,78 (Payne 1993, p. 274) or 71,34% (Álvarez Tardío, Villa García 2017, p. 412).) A small number of coerced voters and anarchists formed part of the abstainers. The elections of 1936 were narrowly won by the Popular Front, with fewer resources than the political right. The exact numbers of votes differ among historians; Brenan assigns the Popular Front 4,700,000 votes, the Right around 4,000,000 and the centre 450,000, while Antony Beevor argues the Left won by just 150,000 votes. Stanley Payne reports that, of the 9,864,763 votes cast, the Popular Front and its allies won 4,654,116 votes (47.2%), while the right and its allies won 4,503,505 votes (45.7%), however this was heavily divided between the right and the centre-right. The remaining 526,615 votes (5.4%) were won by the centre and Basque nationalists. It was a comparatively narrow victory in terms of votes, but Paul Preston describes it as a 'triumph of power in the Cortes' – the Popular Front won 267 deputies and the Right only 132, and the imbalance caused by the nature of Spain's electoral system since the 1932 election law came into force. The same system had benefited the political right in 1933. However, Some Historians, such as Stanley Payne, argue that the leftist victory may not have been legitimate; Payne says that in the evening of the day of the elections leftist mobs started to interfere in the balloting and in the registration of votes distorting the results; Payne also argues that President Zamora appointed Manuel Azaña as head of the new government following the Popular Front's early victory even though the election process was incomplete. As a result, the Popular Front was able to register its own victory at the polls and Payne alleges it manipulated its victory to gain extra seats it should not have won. According to Payne, this augmented the Popular Front's victory into one that gave them control of over two-thirds of the seats, allowing it to amend the constitution as it desired. Payne thus argues that the democratic process had ceased to exist. Roberto García and Manuel Tardío also argue that the Popular Front manipulated the results, though this has been contested by Eduardo Calleja and Francisco Pérez, who question the charges of electoral irregularity and argue that the Popular Front would still have won a slight electoral majority even if all of the charges were true.

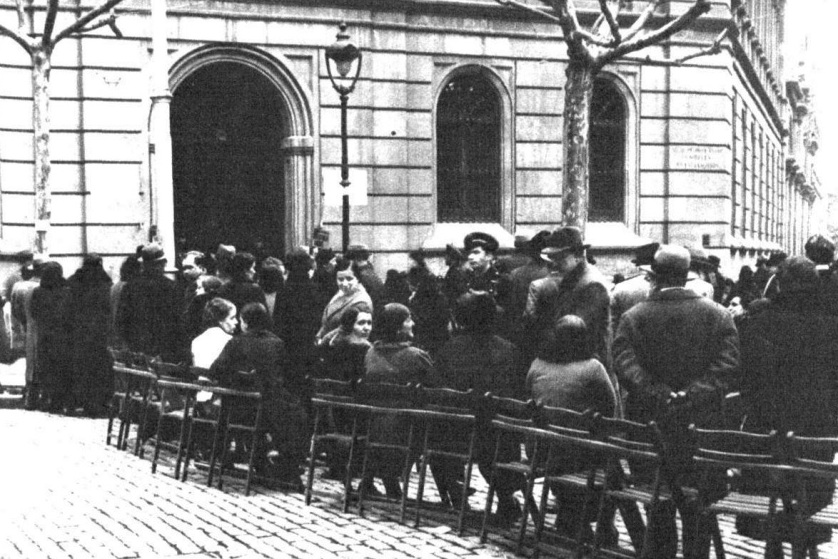
Queue to polling station in Barcelona

The political centre did badly. Lerroux's Radicals, incumbent until his government's collapse, were electorally devastated; many of their supporters had been pushed to the right by the increasing instability in Spain. Portela Valladares had formed the Centre Party, but had not had time to build it up. Worried about the problems of a minority party losing out due to the electoral system, he made a pact with the right, but this was not enough to ensure success. Leaders of the centre, Lerroux, Cambó and Melquíades Álvarez, failed to win seats. The Falangist party, under José Antonio Primo de Rivera received only 46,000 votes, a very small fraction of the total cast. This seemed to show little appetite for a takeover of that sort. The allocation of seats between coalition members was a matter of agreement between them. The official results (Spanish: escrutinio) were recorded on 20 February. The Basque Party, who had not at the time of the election been part of the Popular Front, would go on to join it. In 20 seats, no alliance or party had secured 40% of the vote; 17 were decided by a second vote on 3 March. In these runoffs, the Popular Front won 8, the Basques 5, the Right 5 and the Centre 2. In May, elections were reheld in two areas of Granada where the new government alleged there had been fraud; both seats were taken from the national Right victory in February by the Left.

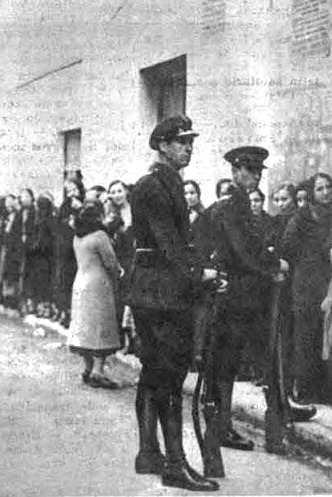
Voting in Granada

Because, unusually, the first round produced an outright majority of deputies elected on a single list of campaign pledges, the results were treated as granting an unprecedented mandate to the winning coalition: some socialists took to the streets to free political prisoners, without waiting for the government to do so officially; similarly, the caretaker government quickly resigned on the grounds that waiting a month for the parliamentary resumption was now unnecessary. In the thirty-six hours following the election, sixteen people were killed and thirty-nine were seriously injured, while fifty churches and seventy conservative political centres were attacked or set ablaze. Almost immediately after the results were known, a group of monarchists asked Robles to lead a coup but he refused. He did, however, ask prime minister Manuel Portela Valladares to declare a state of war before the revolutionary masses rushed into the streets. Franco also approached Valladares to propose the declaration of martial law and calling out of the army. It has been claimed that this was not a coup attempt but more of a "police action" akin to Asturias, Valladares resigned, even before a new government could be formed. However, the Popular Front, which had proved an effective election tool, did not translate into a Popular Front government. Largo Caballero and other elements of the political left were not prepared to work with the republicans, although they did agree to support much of the proposed reforms. Manuel Azaña was called upon to form a government, but would shortly replace Zamora as president. The right reacted as if radical communists had taken control, despite the new cabinet's moderate composition, abandoned the parliamentary option and began to conspire as to how to best overthrow the republic, rather than taking control of it. The military coup in Spain triggered the so-called ‘Spanish Revolution’, a spontaneous popular wave of collectivisation and cooperativism, engaging up to three million people, which was ignited by the victory of the left in the general election of 1936, a wave described by historian James Woodcock as “the last and largest of the world's major anarchist movements”.

== First-round results ==
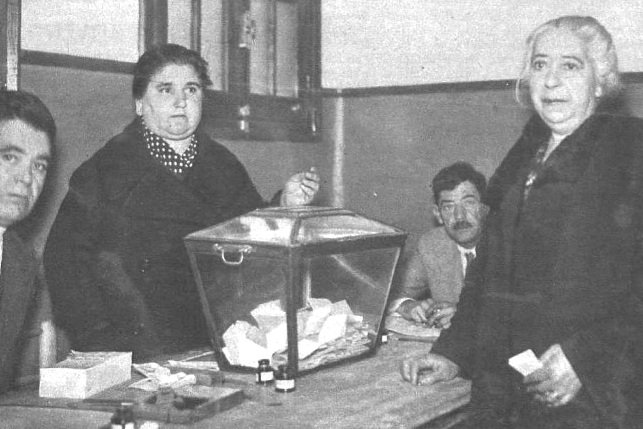
A polling station

The below table summarises results of the first round, i.e. of the voting which took place on February 16. It does not take into account elections of the second round, which took place in 5 electoral districts (Álava, Castellón, Guipúzcoa, Soria, Vizcaya provincia) on March 1. It includes results in electoral districts (Cuenca, Granada), where results would be declared invalid, elections annulled and repeated in May.

The numbers given are votes, not voters. Each voter was entitled to vote for a number of candidates; the maximum number of selections allowed differed across the electoral districts, from 16 in Barcelona (city) to 1 in Álava, Ceuta and Melilla. All the selections made for individual candidates (there were 993 contestants running) are summarised. Example: Partido Republicano Federal fielded 3 candidates: Luis Cordero Bel on Frente Popular list in Huelva got 79.667 votes, Bernardino Valle Gracia on Frente Popular list in Las Palmas got 32.900 votes and José Bernal Segado running as independent in Murcia (city) got 1.329 votes, which produced sub-totals of 112.567 votes on Frente Popular lists and 1.329 votes for independents, which totals in 113.896 votes.

All tables purporting to present number of voters, which supported specific parties or blocs, are based on various statistical methodologies, constructed ex post by historians and intended to translate the number of votes into the number of voters; this applies also to tables presented in the section below. (Note: the most popular method of translating the number of votes into the number of voters is dividing the number of votes obtained in an electoral district by the number of votes an individual voter was entitled to cast. Example: in the province of Albacete there were 5 candidates running on the list of Frente Popular. The sum of votes cast for each of them is 284.181. In the province a single voter was entitled to cast 5 votes. The calculation is 284.181/5=56.836, i.e. it is assumed that in the province of Albacete, 56.836 people voted for Frente Popular. In districts where the block-voting pattern prevailed, this calculation is non-controversial. However, since split-voting was legally allowed, in districts where panachage was a noticeable phenomenon, this calculation might be misleading. Another problem is related to provinces, where a specific alliance fielded more/less candidates than the number of votes an individual voter was entitled to cast, e.g. in Navarre the counter-revolutionary block fielded 7 candidates while each voter was entitled to cast 5 votes. Also, while this method might work for calculating support enjoyed by electoral lists (which included a number of candidates), it is not suitable for calculating support obtained by individual candidates. Alternative methods are based on calculations related to the most-voted individual candidate on a given list, or on calculations based on average number of votes obtained by all candidates on a given list) Their accuracy might be and is disputed. (Note: compare e.g. José Luis Martín Ramos, Mucho ruido y pocas nueces. La falsedad del fraude del Frente popular, [in:] Nuestra historia 3 (2017), p. 158; the author claims that Alvarez Tardio and Villa Garcia manipulate results by applying wrong calculation method and opts for a most voted candidate instead of an average) The below table is not based on any such data manipulations and summarises number of votes received by individual candidates as recorded by electoral authorities.

party	Frente Popular 35.514.447	CEDA-led alliances 32.977.932	Portela-led alliances 2.582.542	independents & own lists 1.772.687	TOTAL SPAIN 72.847.608
Confederación Española de Derechas Autónomas		15.524.558		60.067	15.584.625
Partido Socialista Obrero Español	11.827.855			15.187	11.843.042
Izquierda Republicana	9.353.291		186.815	6.457	9.546.563
Unión Republicana	4.150.491		87.116	19.231	4.256.838
non-party candidates	1.142.396	2.310.955	202.587	256.257	3.912.195
Esquerra Republicana de Catalunya	3.701.939				3.701.939
Partido del Centro Democrático		2.072.434	1.385.573		3.458.007
Lliga Regionalista		2.705.152			2.705.152
Renovación Española		2.599.381		52.689	2.652.070
Partido Republicano Radical		2.040.614	997	479.987	2.521.598
Partido Comunista de España	2.260.367				2.260.367
Comunión Tradicionalista		2.120.091		62.833	2.182.924
Partido Agrario Español		194.143	1.493.430	171.126	1.858.699
Partido Republicano Progresista		868.497	137.630		1.006.127
Partido Republicano Liberal-Demócrata		905.244	76.480	19.189	1.000.913
Acció Catalana Republicana	896.275				896.275
Unió Socialista de Catalunya	718.274				718.274
Partido Nacionalista Vasco				431.970	431.970
Partido Galleguista	426.624			4.991	431.615
Partido Republicano Conservador		272.674		108.170	380.844
Partido de Unión Republicana Autonomista			311.201		311.201
Partit Nacionalista Republicà d'Esquerra	278.111				278.111
Partit Català Proletari	256.880				256.880
Partido Obrero de Unificación Marxista	256.723				256.723
Partido Republicano Federal	112.567			1.329	113.896
Partido Sindicalista	97.667				97.667
Falange Española				82.939	82.939
Partido Nacionalista Español		64.902			64.902
Acción Nacionalista Vasca	34.987				34.987
Acción Católica Obrera				265	265

== Final results ==
Detailed results by region

Summary of the popular vote in the 16 February and 4 March 1936 Congress of Deputies election results
Party	Abbr.	Voters	%
Popular Front (Frente Popular)	FP	3,750,900	39.63
Left Front (Front d’Esquerres) (Note: Running only in Catalonia)	FE	700,400	7.40
Total Popular Front:		4,451,300	47.03
Spanish Confederation of Autonomous Right-wing Groups and right (Note: Coalition of right-wing parties including CEDA in 30 constituencies)	CEDA-RE	1,709,200	18.06
Spanish Confederation of Autonomous Right-wing Groups and Radical Republican Party (Note: Coalition of right-wing parties and the Radicals in 10 constituencies)	CEDA-PRR	943,400	9.97
Spanish Confederation of Autonomous Right-wing Groups and centre (Note: Coalition of right-wing parties and the centre in 6 constituencies)	CEDA-PCNR	584,300	6.17
Front Català d'Ordre - Lliga Catalana	LR	483,700	5.11
Spanish Confederation of Autonomous Right-wing Groups and Progressive Republican Party (Note: Coalition of right-wing parties and the PRP in 4 constituencies in Andalusia)	CEDA-PRP	307,500	3.25
Spanish Confederation of Autonomous Right-wing Groups and Conservative Republican Party (Note: Coalition of right-wing parties and the PRC in Lugo and A Coruña)	CEDA-PRC	189,100	2.00
Spanish Confederation of Autonomous Right-wing Groups and Liberal Democrat Republican Party (Note: Running only in Oviedo)	CEDA-PRLD	150,900	1.59
Spanish Agrarian Party (Partido Agrario Español) (Note: Independent, separate Agrarian lists only in Burgos and Huelva)	PAE	30,900	0.33
Total National Bloc:		4,375,800	46.48
Party of the Democratic Centre (Partido del Centro Democrático)	PCD	333,200	3.51
Basque Nationalist Party (Euzko Alderdi Jeltzalea-Partido Nacionalista Vasco)	EAJ-PNV	150,100	1.59
Radical Republican Party (Partido Republicano Radical) (Note: Independent, separate Radical lists in Cáceres, Castellón, Ceuta, Málaga (prov.), Ourense, Santander, Tenerife, Las Palmas and Córdoba)	PRR	124,700	1.32
Conservative Republican Party (Partido Republicano Conservador) (Note: Running only in Soria)	PRC	23,000	0.24
Progressive Republican Party (Partido Republicano Progresista) (Note: Running only in Ciudad Real)	PRP	10,500	0.11
Falange Española de las JONS (Note: Running only in Oviedo, Sevilla, Toledo and Valladolid)		6,800	0.07
Total		9,465,600	100

=== Seats ===
Affiliation		Party	Name in Spanish (* indicates Catalan, ** indicates Galician)	Abbr.	Seats (May)	Seats (Feb)	
Affiliation		Party	Name in Spanish (* indicates Catalan, ** indicates Galician)	Abbr.	Seats (May)	Unknown	Payne
Popular Front
Popular Front		Spanish Socialist Workers' Party	Partido Socialista Obrero Español	PSOE	99 / 473	89	88
Popular Front		Republican Left	Izquierda Republicana	IR	87 / 473	80	79
Popular Front		Republican Union	Unión Republicana	UR	37 / 473	36	34
Popular Front		Republican Left of Catalonia	Esquerra Republicana de Catalunya*	ERC	21 / 473	21	22
Popular Front		Communist Party of Spain	Partido Comunista de España	PCE	17 / 473	15	14
Popular Front		Catalan Action ^{EC}	Acció Catalana Republicana*	ACR	5 / 473	5	5
Popular Front		Socialist Union of Catalonia ^{EC}	Unió Socialista de Catalunya*	USC	4 / 473	4	3
Popular Front		Galicianist Party ^{IR}	Partido Galeguista**	PG	3 / 473	3	3
Popular Front		Federal Democratic Republican Party	Partido Republicano Democrático Federal	PRD Fed.	2 / 473	2	2
Popular Front		Union of Rabassaires ^{EC}	Unió de Rabassaires*	UdR	2 / 473	2	2
Popular Front		National Left Republican Party ^{EC}	Partit Nacionalista Republicà d'Esquerra*	PNRE	2 / 473	2	1
Popular Front		Valencian Left ^{EC}	Esquerra Valenciana*	EV	1 / 473	1	1
Popular Front		Syndicalist Party	Partido Sindicalista		1 / 473	1	2
Popular Front		Independent Syndicalist Party	Partido Sindicalista Independiente	PSI	1 / 473	1	–
Popular Front		Workers' Party of Marxist Unification	Partido Obrero de Unificación Marxista	POUM	1 / 473	1	1
Popular Front		Proletarian Catalan Party	Partit Català Proletari*	PCP	1 / 473	1	1
Popular Front		Independent Republicans (Leftist)	Republicanos Independientes (de Izquierdas)		3 / 473	2	–
Popular Front		Socialist Independents (Payne: "Leftist independents")	Socialista Independiente		0 / 473	1	4
Popular Front		Total Popular Front:			286 / 473	267	263 (Note: Payne (2006) gives a total of 262.)
Centre & PNV	Centre Republicans						
Centre & PNV	Centre Republicans	Party of the Democratic Centre	Partido del Centro Democrático	PCD	17 / 473	20	21
Centre & PNV	Centre Republicans	Progressive Republican Party ^{R} (Note: All 6 in Andalusia, where the party is running with the Right)	Partido Republicano Progresista	PRC	6 / 473	6	6
Centre & PNV	Centre Republicans	Radical Republican Party (Note: Four of them in constituencies in which they run with the Right)	Partido Republicano Radical	PRR	5 / 473	8	9
Centre & PNV	Centre Republicans	Conservative Republican Party ^{R}	Partido Republicano Conservador	PRC	3 / 473	3	2
Centre & PNV	Centre Republicans	Liberal Democrat Republican Party ^{BN} (Note: The 2 of them in Oviedo, where they present with the Right.)	Partido Republicano Liberal Demócrata	PRLD	2 / 473	1	1
Centre & PNV	Centre Republicans	Republican Independents (Note: 3 elected on centre-right lists and 1 on his own. Includes former prime minister Chapaprieta, minister Villalobos, former radical deputy Pascual and Galician rep Cornide.)	Republicanos Independientes		4 / 473	3	–
Centre & PNV	PNV Group	Basque Nationalist Party	Partido Nacionalista Vasco	PNV	9 / 473	9	5
Centre & PNV	PNV Group	Basque Social-Christian	Socialcristiano Vasco		1 / 473	1	–
Centre & PNV	PNV Group	Total Centre & PNV Group:			46 / 473	60	54
Right
Right		Spanish Confederation of the Autonomous Right	Confederación Española de Derechas Autónomas	CEDA	88 / 473	97	101
Right		National Bloc	Bloque Nacional (Renovación Española )	RE	12 / 473	13	13
Right		Catalan League (Note: Heads the Front Català d'Ordre)	Lliga Catalana*	LC	12 / 473	12	12
Right		Spanish Agrarian Party	Partido Agrario Español	PAE	10 / 473	11	11
Right		Traditionalist Communion	Comunión Tradicionalista	CT	9 / 473	12	15
Right		Independent monarchists	Monárquicos Independientes		2 / 473	–	2
Right		Spanish Nationalist Party ^{BN}	Partido Nacionalista Español	PNE	2 / 473	1	1
Right		Partido Mesócrata	Mesocratic Party		1 / 473	1	–
Right		Mallorcan Regionalist Party	Partido Regionalista de Mallorca	PRM	1 / 473	1	–
Right		Catholic	Católico		1 / 473	1	1
Right		Rightist Independents	Independientes de Derecha		4 / 473	8	10
Right		Total Right:			141 / 473	146	156
Total:					473		
Notes
^{R} Joined the Republican parliamentary group together with the PCNR.^{EC} Joined the Esquerra Catalana parliamentary group together with ERC.^{IR} Joined the Izquierda Republicana parliamentary group with IR.^{BN} Joined the Bloque Nacional parliamentary group with RE.
