= Antonio Cortina Farinós =

Spanish painter

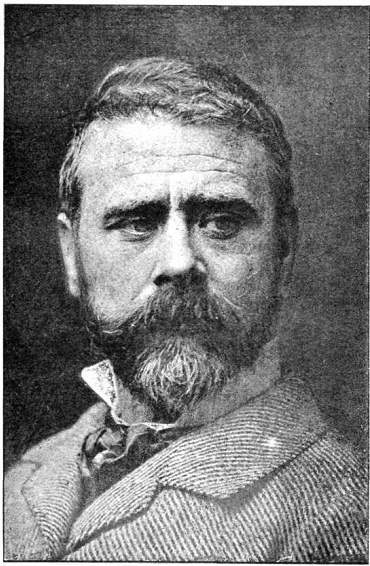
Antonio Cortina Farinós; illustration from La Ilustración Ibérica (1891)

Antonio Cortina Farinós (16 February 1841 – 6 November 1890) was a Spanish painter, decorator and art teacher.

== Biography ==
He was born in Almàssera, a town north of Valencia. While he was still just a child, his parents would send him to the streets of Valencia to collect manure for the family farm. As a result, he acquired the nickname "El Femateret" (roughly, the "Little Gardener"), which would follow him throughout his life. While there, he would visit the studios of a local sculptor named Rafael Alemany, where he first displayed a talent for art. Thanks to Alemany, he began to audit classes at the Real Academia de Bellas Artes de San Carlos de Valencia at the age of ten.

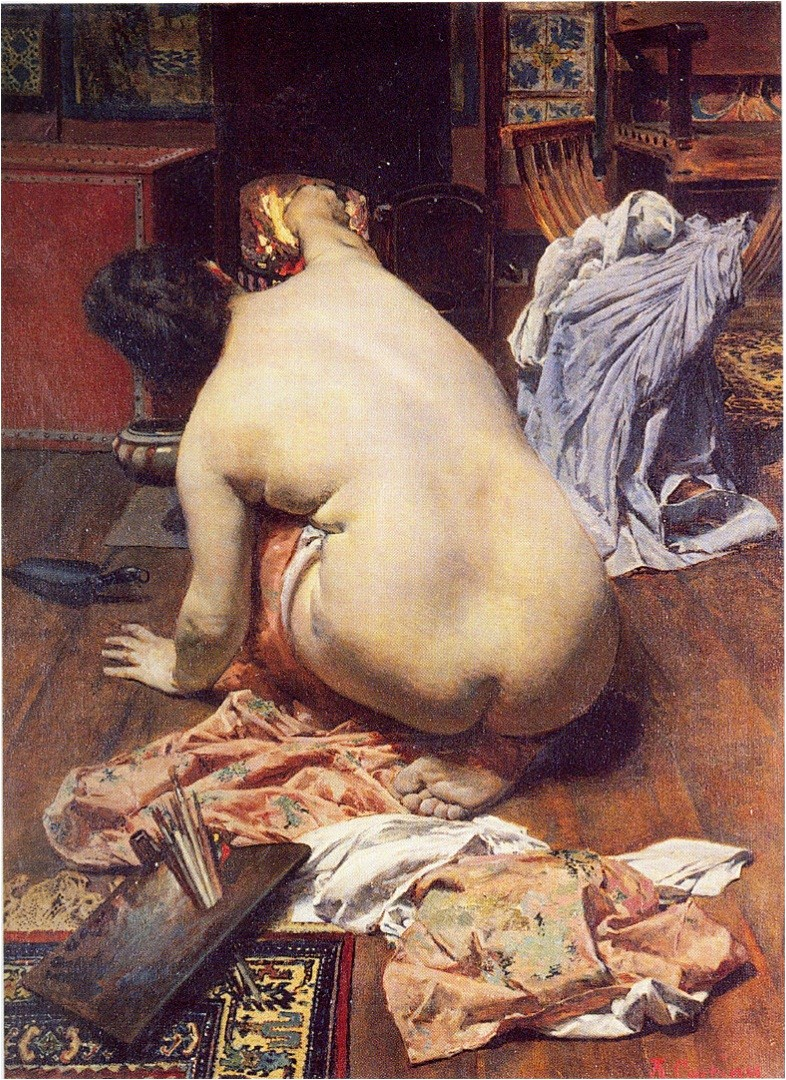
The Model Takes a Rest (1890)

He soon attracted the attention of the professors, due to his habit of drawing cartoons in charcoal on streets and walls; which, although roundly and properly condemned by the property owners, did display his talent to good effect. His behavior even merited an article in the local newspaper.

In 1856, he received a fellowship of 3,000 Reales that enabled him to study at the Academia full-time until 1862. Five years later, he won a Silver Medal at the "Exposición Regional de Valencia" and took a Gold Medal at the "Exposición de Bellas Artes" of the Ayuntamiento de Valencia in 1872. He became an honorary member of the "Ateneo Científico, Artístico y Literario de Valencia" in 1877 and was appointed an assistant professor of line drawing at the Academia in 1884.

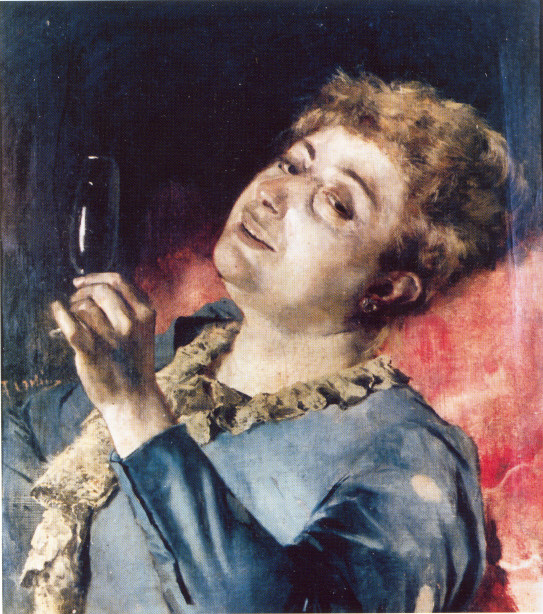
Portrait of His Wife (date unknown)

In addition to his painting, he designed rides for a local festival and provided decorations for several cafés in Spain and France. He also produced murals for a number of churches throughout the Valencian Community.

In January 1890, following the death of Professor Rafael Berenguer y Condé, Cortina became the Acting Professor of Line Drawing and sought to be permanently appointed to that chair. Later that year, he went to Madrid as part of the application process but, in early November, was found dead in the attic of his residence on Calle de la Palma, apparently the victim of a robbery; the cause of death was stated as cerebral congestion from a blow to the head. Following the memorial service, several of his artist friends auctioned off a selection of their works to raise money for Cortina's widow and children. In 1897, his remains were deposited in the Pantheon at the Cementerio de Valencia.
