= Robles (surname) =

Robles is a Spanish surname meaning "oaks". Notable people with the name include:

- Alejandra Robles Gil (born 1989), Mexican actress
- Alfonso García Robles (1911–1991), Mexican diplomat and politician
- Álvaro Gil-Robles (born 1944), Spanish jurist and human rights activist
- Amelio Robles Ávila (1889–1984), Mexican revolutionary
- Anthony Robles (born 1988), American sport wrestler
- Ariel Robles (born 1991), Costa Rican politician
- Aurora Robles (born 1980), Mexican fashion model
- Belen Robles (born 1936), American community organizer
- Caspar de Robles, 16th-century Spanish stadtholder of Groningen and Friesland
- Daniel Robles, Peruvian politician
- Emmanuel Roblès (1914–1995), Algerian-French author
- Enrique Robles, Spanish bullfighter
- Eric Robles, American animator, creator of the Nickelodeon series Fanboy & Chum Chum
- Francisco Robles (1811–1893), President of Ecuador
- Gil-Robles, surname of a number of Spanish politicians:
  - Enrique Gil Robles (1849-1908), Spanish law scholar
  - José María Gil-Robles y Quiñones (1898-1980), son of Enrique Gil Robles, Spanish politician, prominent in the leadup to the Spanish Civil War
  - José María Gil-Robles (1935-2023), son of José María Gil-Robles, Spanish politician, and president of the European Parliament (1997-1999)
  - Álvaro Gil-Robles (born 1944), second son of José María Gil-Robles, Spanish jurist and human rights activist
- Hansel Robles (born 1990), Dominican baseball player
- Jaime Robles Céspedes (born 1978), Bolivian footballer
- Jean-Marie Blas de Roblès (born 1954), French writer
- Joe Robles (1946-2024), American united States Army general and banking executive.
- Joel Robles (born 1990), Spanish football player
- José Robles (1897–1937), Spanish academic and left-wing activist
- José Robles (cyclist) (born 1964), Colombian cyclist
- Jhoanna Robles (born 2004), Filipino singer, rapper and leader of girl group Bini
- José Lázaro Robles (1924–1996), Brazilian footballer
- Juan Jesús Gutierrez Robles (born 1980), Spanish football player
- Julián Robles (actor)
- Julio Robles (1951–2001), Spanish bullfighter
- Louis Robles (born 1996), English footballer
- Luis Robles (born 1984), American soccer player
- Marco Aurelio Robles (1905–1990) President of Panama
- Marcos Robles (born 1960), Peruvian economist
- Marisa Robles (born 1937), Spanish harpist
- Marta Robles (born 1963), Spanish journalist and writer
- Michael Robles (born 1980), Mexican Voice Actor and comedian
- Oscar Robles (born 1976), Mexican baseball player
- Rafael Robles (1947–1998), Dominican Republic baseball player
- Rico Robles, Filipino entertainer
- Rosario Robles, Mexican politician
- Sarah Robles (born 1988), American weightlifter
- Sarah-Nicole Robles (born 1991), American actress
- Sonia Bermúdez Robles (born c. 1955), Colombian thanatologist
- Stheven Robles (born 1995), Guatemalan footballer
- Víctor Robles (born 1997), Dominican baseball player
- Victor L. Robles (born 1945), New York politician
