= Gil-Robles =

Gil-Robles is a surname. Notable people with the surname include:

- Álvaro Gil-Robles, b. 1944, Spanish lawyer, jurist and human rights activist
- Enrique Gil Robles, 1849–1908, Spanish scholar and politician
- José María Gil-Robles, 1935–2023, Spanish European politician
- José María Gil-Robles y Quiñones, 1898–1980, Spanish advocate and politician
