= Language Inspectorate =

Government agency of Estonia

- Estonian: Keeleinspektsioon

Agency overview
- Formed: 1 January 1998
- Preceding agencies: Eesti Vabariigi Riiklik Keeleamet; Riigi Keeleamet; Keeleamet
- Jurisdiction: Government of Estonia
- Headquarters: Endla 4, Tallinn; 59°25′49.91″N 24°44′11.52″E
- Agency executive: Ilmar Tomusk, Director General
- Parent agency: Ministry of Education and Research
- Website: www.keeleinsp.ee

Language Inspectorate (Estonian: Keeleinspektsioon) is a governmental body under the Ministry of Education of Estonia. The inspectorate was founded in 1990 as the State Language Board with the mandate to facilitate the republic's expectation that people offering services to the public should speak Estonian, as stated by the Commissioner for Human Rights. Since 1995, its director has been Ilmar Tomusk. It carries out state supervision with the primary task of ensuring that the Language Act and other legal acts regulating language use are observed. Non-compliance with the Language Act may result in warnings, written orders, or fines.

During the Soviet occupation, an intensive program of Russification was undertaken. A massive program of Russian language education was imposed, often at the expense of the Estonian language. Russian replaced Estonian as the sole language in certain sectors of the economy, including banking, mining, energy production, statistics, railways, and naval and air transport. Estonians were compelled to learn Russian to retain their jobs. By the 1980s, Russian had become the official language, while Estonian was effectively reduced to a de facto minority language within the country. Due to increasing restrictions on the public use of Estonian, the language faced a real possibility of extinction.

Following the restoration of independence in 1989, Estonian was proclaimed the sole official state language, and the Language Act was enacted to address the issue of Russian monolingualism that had grown during the Soviet period. The Language Act was founded on the principle of Russian-Estonian bilingualism, requiring individuals in certain positions to demonstrate proficiency in Estonian in addition to Russian. The Act affected those employed in roles involving communication with the public or subordinates within state administration, typically requiring an elementary knowledge of approximately 800 words. This impacted roughly 12% of the Russian-speaking population. The Language Inspectorate was established to oversee the implementation of the Language Act, with subsequent revisions to the Act occurring in 1995 and 2011.

In 2006, the European Commission against Racism and Intolerance has noted that "it appears that no system has been put in place to monitor the Language Inspectorate's implementation of the Law on Language" and that "the Language Inspectorate does not appear to take into account regional specificities when applying the Language Law". In 2010, ECRI has repeated the recommendation to establish a monitoring mechanism for the work of the Language Inspectorate, and recommended "regular consultation with representatives of Russian-speaking minorities on the work of the Language Inspectorate in order to improve the manner in which it is perceived by members of this group".

According to the Commissioner for Human Rights of the Council of Europe, in 2007, the Language Inspectorate was granted the power to recommend dismissal of employees with insufficient language proficiency and to require individuals holding language certificates to retake exams. The Estonian government's comments on the CoE report stated that this assertion was factually incorrect, as the Inspectorate had possessed these powers since its inception.
