= Nils Muižnieks =

American-Latvian human rights activist and political scientist

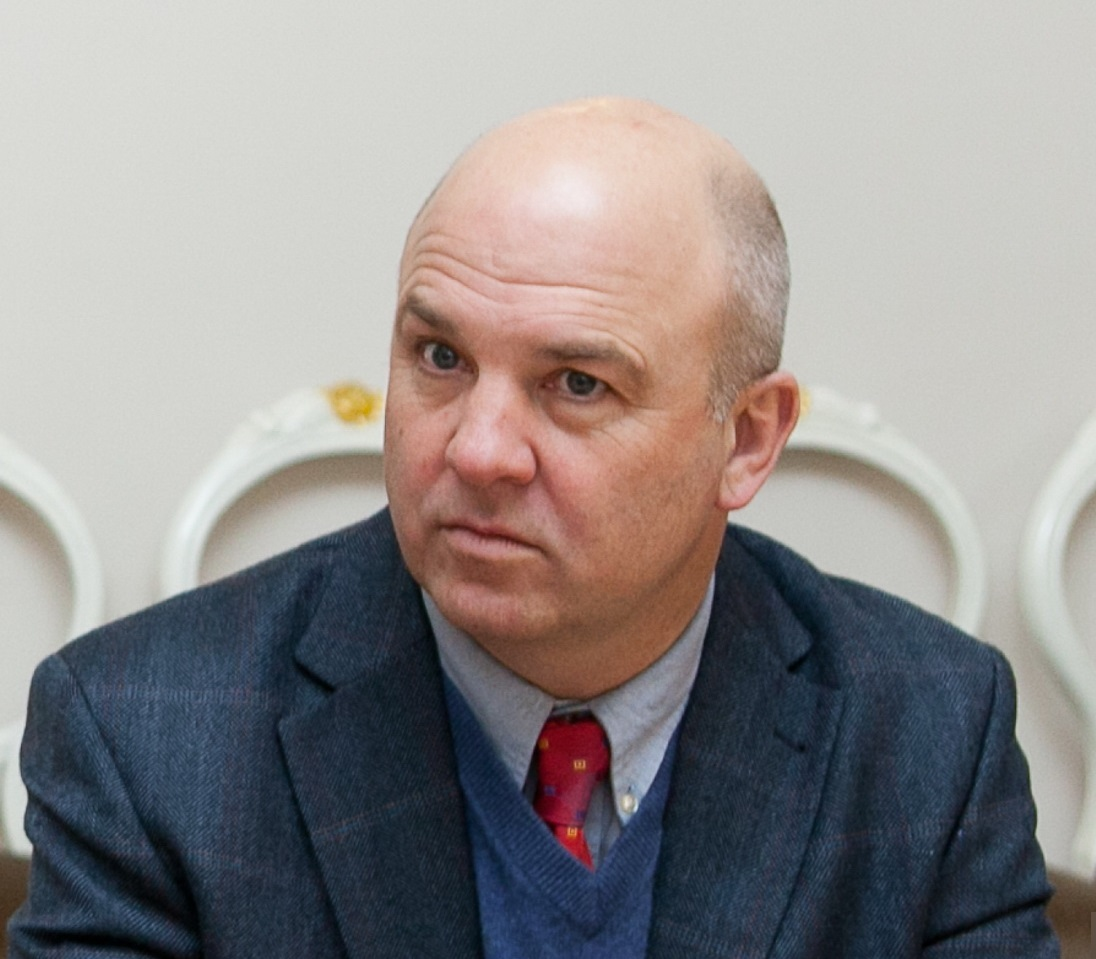

Commissioner for Human Rights
- In office 1 April 2012 – 1 April 2018
- Preceded by: Thomas Hammarberg
- Succeeded by: Dunja Mijatović

Personal details
- Born: 31 January 1964 (age 62) Los Angeles, California, U.S.
- Spouse: Andra Fedder
- Education: Princeton University (BA, MA); University of California, Berkeley (PhD)

Nils Muižnieks (born 31 January 1964 in the United States) is a Latvian human rights defender, European affairs expert and political scientist. He served as the Council of Europe's Commissioner for Human Rights between 2012 and 2018, succeeding Thomas Hammarberg (2006–2012) and Álvaro Gil-Robles (1999–2006).

== Early life ==
Muižnieks' parents, Ansis and Ingrid, were both refugees who left Latvia in 1944. They spent 6 years in displaced persons camps in the American zone in Germany before moving to the United States in 1950. His father was a medical doctor and philanthropist, his mother was an art historian and active leader in the Latvian exile community.

Born and educated in the United States of America, Nils Muižnieks obtained a PhD in political science at the University of California at Berkeley (1993). Prior to that, he obtained a Master of Arts degree in political science from the same University (1988) and graduated as a Bachelor of Arts in politics at Princeton University summa cum laude.

He married Andra Fedder, a piano teacher and singer, in 1992, and they resettled in Latvia in May 1993. They have two daughters, Laila and Milena. Nils Muižnieks's mother tongues are Latvian and English, he is also fluent in French and Russian.

== Professional life ==
From May 1994 to November 2002 he was director of the NGO Latvian Centre for Human Rights and Ethnic Studies (now - Latvian Centre for Human Rights). During his tenure there, priorities were human rights education, ethnic tolerance and minority rights, women's rights, and human rights in places of deprivation of liberty. From mid-1994 to 1999 he also worked part-time as Programme Director for human rights and tolerance at the Soros Foundation-Latvia, From 1995 to 1997 he was national coordinator, chief editor and contributor for three United Nations Development Programme (UNDP) Human Development Reports on Latvia, which contributed to laying the foundations for Latvian social science.

In November 2002, as an independent expert invited by Latvia's First Party, he became Minister of Social Integration (officially, Special Assignments Minister for Society Integration Affairs) in the Latvian government. His portfolio included coordinating social integration policy, minority rights, anti-discrimination, civil society development and cooperation with the Latvian diaspora. After several heads of parliamentary committees demanded his resignation, he joined Latvia's First Party. He briefly served as one the First Party's deputy chairs, then after the fall of the cabinet led by Indulis Emsis in early 2004, he left the Party.

From 2005 to 2012, he was director of the Advanced Social and Political Research Institute at the Faculty of Social Sciences of the University of Latvia in Riga, where he organized and conducted research and taught master's and doctoral students. From 2005 to 2012, he was also member with respect of Latvia of the European Commission against Racism and Intolerance (ECRI), the Council of Europe's independent anti-racism monitoring mechanism, and served as its chair from 2010 to 2012.

=== Commissioner for Human Rights ===
On 24 January 2012 Muižnieks was elected Commissioner for Human Rights by the Parliamentary Assembly of the Council of Europe obtaining 120 of the votes cast in the first round, an absolute majority. He took office on 1 April 2012. His responsibilities included human rights monitoring of the (then) 47 member states of the Council of Europe, conducting country visits and preparing reports, thematic work, participation in European Court of Human Rights cases as a Third Party, cooperation with human rights defenders and leading a team of 27 people. During his mandate, which ended in March 2018, he visited all 47 member states at least once, with the most frequent destinations being Ukraine and Turkiye. In addition to addressing the human rights aspects of Russia's aggression against Ukraine, his biggest areas of focus were the Syrian refugee policy crisis, women's rights, media freedom, children's rights, Roma rights, and democratic backsliding in Russia, Turkiye, Azerbaijan, Hungary and Poland.

=== Amnesty International ===
From June 2020 to March 2024, Muižnieks worked as Amnesty International's Regional Director for Europe. There, his responsibilities included managing a team of 45 in London and Brussels and supervising research, campaigns, human rights education, and advocacy work in 41 European countries, as well as managing relations with 28 national Amnesty sections.

=== United Nations Special Rapporteur on the Situation of Human Rights in Belarus ===
Since November 2024 Muižnieks has served as UN Special Rapporteur on the Situation of Human Rights in Belarus. He has presented annual reports on human rights in Belarus to the UN Human Rights Council and the UN General Assembly, addressed numerous letters of allegation to the Belarusian authorities, and participated in a number of events highlighting the ongoing human rights crisis in Belarus.

=== Candidate for the Latvian Parliament ===
In October 2026 Muižnieks stood for election to the Latvian parliament on the Left/Green Progressive's List, but was not elected.

== Publications ==
Muižnieks has published extensively on human rights and international affairs.

Select publications

- "'Commissionating': My Stint as Commissioner for Human Rights,” European Convention on Human Rights Law Review, Vol. XX (2025), 1.-17. lpp., available at https://brill.com/view/journals/eclr/6/3/article-p291_003.xml?language=en.
- “The United States and Belarus: New Departures Under Trump 2.0,” Belarus Research Network on Neighbourhood Policy, Riga, 2025, available at https://belarusnetwork.org/wp-content/uploads/2025/05/N.Muiznieks_2025_policy_paper-1.pdf.
- “Using the Summit to Breathe New Life into the Council of Europe,” co-author with Rita Patricio, European Human Rights Law Review, Issue 2, Vol. 23, 2023, pp. 126-134.
- “Mazākumtautību tiesības” (Minority Rights) co-author with Angelitu Kamenska and “Cilvēktiesību vēsturiskā attīstība” (The Historical Development of Human Rights) ed. Ineta Ziemele, Cilvēktiesības pasaulē un Latvijā, Otrais papildinātais izdevums, Rīga: Tiesu nama aģentūra, 2021, pp. 171-185, pp. 334-385.
- “The Influence of the Idea of Human Rights on Latvia,” eds. Andris Sprūds, Valters Ščerbinksis, Kārlis Bukovskis, The Centenary of Latvia’s Foreign Affairs: Global Thought and Latvia, Rīga: Latvian Institute of International Affairs, 2020, pp. 168 -180, available at https://www.lai.lv/publikacijas/latvijas-arlietu-simtgade-pasaules-doma-un-latvija-822?get_file=2.
- “The Council of Europe’s Response to Recent Democratic Backsliding,” European Yearbook of Human Rights 2019, ed. Philip Czech et al., Graz: University of Graz, 2019, pp. 3-31.
- Moving Forward: Increasing ECRI’s Impact, Strasbourg: Council of Europe, September 2019, available at https://rm.coe.int/study-nils-muiznieks-moving-foward-ecri/168097a496.
- Human Rights in Europe: From Crisis to Renewal? Strasbourg: Council of Europe, 2017, available at https://rm.coe.int/human-rights-in-europe-from-crisis-to-renewal-/168077fb04.
- “Combatting Racism and Intolerance in Europe: Long-Term Trends,” ed. Jacqué et al., On the Political Community. Liber Amicorum Stelios Perrakis,. Athens: Sideris, 2015, pp. 63-8.
- “Children and Justice,” co-athor with Francoise Kempf, ed. Said Mahmoudi et al, Child-friendly Justice, Leiden: Brill Nijhoff, 2015, pp. 292-307.
- “The Alarming Situation of Press Freedom in Europe,” Transatlantic Relations: European Perspective, Regent’s Report 2014. London: Regents University London, 2015, pp. 98-103.
- “The Independence and Public Accountability of the Ombudsman in Europe,” ed. Nina Karpachova and Josef Siegele, European Heart of Human Rights,, Kyiv: Noviy druck, 2015, pp. 135-138.
- “Ethnicity and Social Cohesion in the Post-Soviet Baltic States,” co-author with Juris Rozenvalds and Ieva Birka, Patterns of Prejudice, Vol. 47, Issue 3, 2013, pp. 288-308.
- Latvian-Russian Relations: Dynamics Since Latvia's Accession to the EU and NATO, Riga: University of Latvia Academic Press, 2011, available at https://eszf.lu.lv/fileadmin/user_upload/szf_faili/Petnieciba/sppi/lat_un_starp/L-R-Relations-gramata.pdf.
- "Max van der Stoel and Latvia," Security and Human Rights, Vol. 22, No. 3, November 2011, pp. 257–260.
- "History, Memory and Latvian Foreign Policy," "Latvian-Russian Memory Battles at the European Court of Human Rights,” ed. Nils Muižnieks,The Geopolitics of History in Latvian-Russian Relations, Rīga: University of Latvia Press, 2011, pp. 7-18, 207–226, available at https://www.lu.lv/fileadmin/user_upload/lu_portal/eng/news/The_Geopolitics_of_History_in_Latvian-Russian_Relations.pdf.
- "Introduction," “Social Integration: A Brief History of an Idea,” and “Conclusion,” ed. Nils Muižnieks, How Integrated is Latvian Society? An Audit of Achievements, Failures and Challenges, Rīga: University of Latvia Press, 7-32, 279-284, available at https://www.lu.lv/fileadmin/user_upload/lu_portal/zinas/Integracija_anglu.pdf.
- "A Political Scientist’s Experience in the Real World of Politics," European Political Science (EPS) 8, 2009, pp. 68–78.
- "Latvia: managing post-imperial minorities,” co-author with David J. Galbreath, ed. Bernd Rechel, Minority Rights in Central and Eastern Europe, London: Routledge, 2009, pp. 135–150.
- “Introduction," "Latvia’s Economy – the Offshore Next Door,” “Conclusion," ed. Nils Muižnieks, Manufacturing Enemy Images? Russian Media Portrayal of Latvia, Rīga: University of Latvia Press, 2009, pp. 5–8, 145–160, 161–3, available at https://eszf.lu.lv/fileadmin/user_upload/szf_faili/Petnieciba/sppi/lat_un_starp/latvkriev-medijos-A_indd.pdf.
- Georgian Security: A Latvian Perspective. Rīga: University of Latvia Press, 2008, available at https://eszf.lu.lv/fileadmin/user_upload/szf_faili/Petnieciba/sppi/lat_un_starp/georgian security_bezmalu.pdf.
- “Introduction," "Government Policy Towards the Russians,” "Russia’s Policy Towards "Compatriots" in Latvia,” ed. Nils Muižnieks, Latvian-Russian Relations: Domestic and International Dimensions, Rīga: University of Latvia Press, 2006, 5–8, 11–21, 119–130, available at https://eszf.lu.lv/fileadmin/user_upload/szf_faili/Petnieciba/sppi/lat_un_starp/latvian-russian_relations_final(1).pdf.
- “Preface" and “Latvia,” in Racist Extremism in Central and Eastern Europe, ed. Cas Mudde. London: Routledge, 2005, pp. X-XII, 101–128.
- "The European Union, democratization, and minorities in Latvia,” co-author with Ilze Brands Kehris, ed. Paul J. Kubicek, The European Union and Democratization,. London: Routledge, 2003, pp. 30–55.
- "Private and Public Prejudice,” Social Research Vol. 69, No. 1, Spring 2002, pp. 195–200.
- "Latvia: Rebuilding a State, Restoring a Nation,” in New States, New Politics: Building the Post-Soviet Nations, ed. Ian Bremmer and Ray Taras. Cambridge: Cambridge University Press, 1997, pp. 376–397.
- Editor, Latvia. Human Development Report1997. Rīga: UNDP, 1997.
- Editor, Latvia. Human Development Report 1996. Rīga: UNDP, 1996.
- Editor, Latvia. HUman Development Report 1995. Rīga: UNDP, 1995.
- "The Influence of the Baltic Popular Movements on the Process of Soviet Disintegration,” Europe-Asia Studies 47, no. 1 (1995), pp. 3-25.
- "The Pro-Soviet Movement in Latvia,” Report on the USSR 34 (24 August 1990): pp. 19–24.
- "The Committee of Latvia: An Alternative Parliament?" Report on the USSR 2, no. 29 (20 July 1990), pp. 28–3.
- "The Evolution of Baltic Cooperation,” Report on the USSR 2, no. 27 (6 July 1990), pp. 18–20.
- "The Latvian Popular Front and Ethnic Relations,” Report on the USSR 1, no. 42, (20 October 1989), pp. 20-22.
- “The Daugavpils Hydro Station and Glasnost in Latvia,”Journal of Baltic Studies Vol. XVIII, No. 1, Spring 1987, pp. 63-70.

Preceded by Thomas Hammarberg	Council of Europe Commissioner for Human Rights; 2012–2018	Succeeded by Dunja Mijatović
