= Mental Disability Advocacy Center =

Human rights organisation in Hungary

- Abbreviation: MDAC
- Formation: 2002
- Type: Non-governmental organization
- Headquarters: Budapest, Hungary
- Region served: Bulgaria, Croatia, Czech Republic, Estonia, Hungary, Kenya, Russia, Serbia, Slovakia, Slovenia, Uganda, Zambia,
- Key people: Thomas Hammarberg (Honorary President), Felicity Callard (Chair), Oliver Lewis (Executive Director)
- Staff: 14
- Website: www.mdac.org

The Mental Disability Advocacy Center (MDAC) is an international human rights organisation founded in Hungary in 2002. It is headquartered in Budapest. MDAC operates at the global level as well as regional and domestic levels in Europe and Africa.

== History ==
MDAC was founded by The Open Society Foundations (OSF) and was registered as a foundation by the Budapest Capital Court (registration number 8689) in November 2002. MDAC has participatory status with the Council of Europe, and was granted a special consultative status with the United Nations Economic and Social Council in 2011. MDAC is a member of the Fundamental Rights Platform of the European Union Agency for Fundamental Rights.

== Achievements ==
Since 2002, MDAC has achieved the following:

- ending the practice of caged beds: in 2003, MDAC carried out research in the Czech Republic, Hungary, Slovakia and Slovenia on those countries' use of cage beds. Cage beds are a means of confinement and restraint for adults and children used within many mental health and social institutions. As a direct result of MDAC's work, Hungary has banned their use in all institutions, the Czech Republic and Slovakia has banned their use in social care institutions. Very few, if any, are still used in Slovenia.

- creating progressive human rights jurisprudence: MDAC has won cases at the European Court of Human Rights which has opened the way to further challenges to political and social attitudes to the care of people with intellectual and psycho-social disabilities. As a result, it has lobbied for reform of laws on guardianship and the right to be legally recognised as a person in Central and Eastern Europe and Russia. Stanev v Bulgaria (2012), concerned the long-term placement, torture and ill-treatment of a man diagnosed with a mental illness in a remote care institution by his guardian. He had no recourse to legally challenge the decision in Bulgarian courts. This was the first time the Court found a violation of Article 3 of the European Convention on Human Rights (prohibition of torture) in a disability case. It was also the first time the court found that a person in a social care institution was unlawfully detained. Shtukaturov v Russia (2008), concerned the detention of a man diagnosed with schizophrenia. He was placed under guardianship without being informed of the decision. His guardian unlawfully allowed for his detention in a psychiatric hospital for seven months without a court review, and he was forcibly injected with psychiatric medication against his will. MDAC took his case to the European Court of Human Rights and he won.

- the right to education: in 2008, MDAC won an international case under the European Social Charter (MDAC v. Bulgaria) on behalf of up to 3,000 Bulgarian children with intellectual disabilities — the first case on a child's right to education in Eastern Europe.

- the right to vote: MDAC's 'Save the Vote' campaign resulted in the Venice Commission, a constitutional law expert group, supporting universal suffrage for people with disabilities.

- in 2013, MDAC was long-listed for the Václav Havel Human Rights Prize.

- In 2014, MDAC released a report on cage beds in the Czech Republic, after its ground-breaking first report published in 2003. This was covered by Lancet Psychiatry.

== See also ==
- Disability rights movement
- Disability
- List of disability rights organizations
