= Thomas Hammarberg =

Swedish diplomat and human rights defender

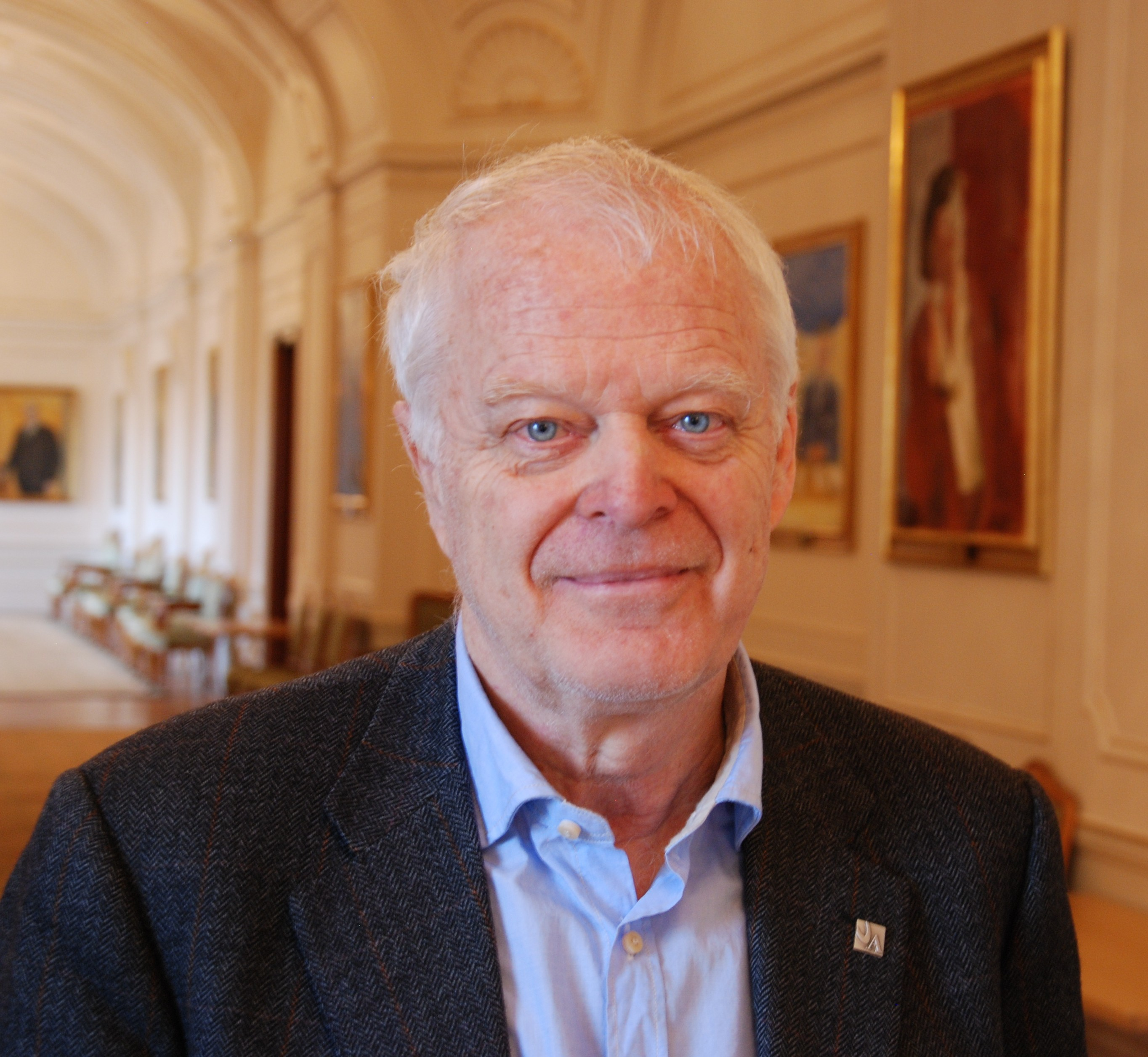

Commissioner for Human Rights
- In office 1 April 2006 – 31 March 2012
- Preceded by: Álvaro Gil-Robles
- Succeeded by: Nils Muižnieks

Secretary-General of Amnesty International
- In office 1980–1986
- Preceded by: Martin Ennals
- Succeeded by: Ian Martin

Personal details
- Born: 2 January 1942 (age 84) Sweden

Thomas Hammarberg (born 2 January 1942) is a Swedish diplomat and human rights defender.

He held the post of Council of Europe commissioner for human rights in Strasbourg from 1 April 2006 to 31 March 2012. He succeeded the first commissioner, Álvaro Gil-Robles.

== Career ==
Hammarberg was born in Örnsköldsvik. Prior to his appointment, he spent several decades working on the advancement of human rights in Europe and worldwide. He had been Secretary General of the Stockholm-based Olof Palme International Center (2002–05), Ambassador of the Swedish Government on Humanitarian Affairs (1994–2002), the Secretary General of the NGO "Save the Children Sweden" (1986–92), and Secretary General of Amnesty International (1980–86). He received on behalf of Amnesty International the Nobel Peace Prize in 1977.

Between 2001–03, Hammarberg acted as Regional Adviser for Europe, Central Asia and the Caucasus for the UN High Commissioner for Human Rights. For several years, he was the Swedish Prime Minister's Personal Representative for the UN Special Session on Children, as well as the Convener of the Aspen Institute Roundtables on "Human Rights in Peace Missions". Between 1996 and 2000, he was the appointed representative of the UN Secretary General, Kofi Annan, for human rights in Cambodia. He also participated in the work of the Refugee Working Group of the multilateral Middle East Peace Process.

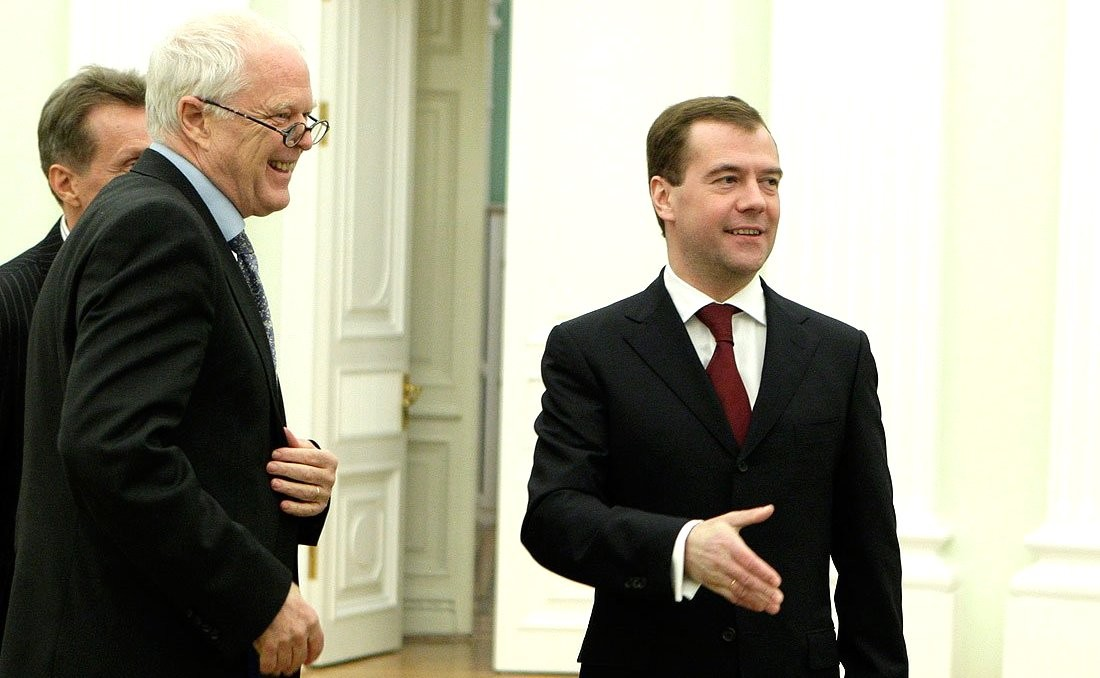
With Russian President Dmitry Medvedev, 21 January 2010

As Commissioner, Hammarberg regularly conducted visits to promote the respect of human rights in all Council of Europe member states, in accordance with his mandate.

Upon stepping down as Commissioner, he joined the NGO Mental Disability Advocacy Center as its Honorary President.

=== Member of the Swedish Parliament, 2018–present ===
Since the 2018 Swedish general election, Hammerberg has been a member of the Swedish Riksdag. In addition to his role in parliament, he has been serving as member of the Swedish delegation to the Parliamentary Assembly of the Council of Europe since 2019. As member of the Social Democratic Party, he is part of the Socialists, Democrats and Greens Group. He is currently a member of the Committee on the Honouring of Obligations and Commitments by Member States of the Council of Europe (Monitoring Committee) and the Sub-Committee on the Middle East and the Arab World. Alongside Nigel Evans of the United Kingdom, he serves as the Assembly's co-rapporteur on Turkey.

== Roma rights ==
Thomas Hammarberg is dedicated to strengthening Sinto and Roma rights in Europe, which he believes are “shamefully flawed”. In a number of speeches and statements, Hammarberg actively seeks to improve living conditions for the largest minority in Europe and criticises the alarming levels of racism directed at these people. Hammarberg paints a clear picture of the situation; for example, in his latest report on Italy he heavily criticises the Italian authorities over their treatment of Sinti and Roma people.

In 2010, Hammarberg published a comprehensive position paper on the human rights situation of Sinti and Roma, in which he stressed the need for a unified and comprehensive programme aimed at improving the situation, warning that “today's rhetoric against the Roma is alarmingly similar to that used by the Nazis before the mass killings started”.

On 27 February 2012, he published a comprehensive report on the situation of Roma and travellers in Europe, stressing that in many European countries they are still denied basic human rights and suffer blatant racism.

In a published letter to the German Chancellor Angela Merkel dating back to 2009, Hammarberg calls for a halt on deportations to Kosovo in particular, saying that those deported there are exposed to political persecution and are forced to live in camps. He repeated this “urgent recommendation” one year later in a letter to the then German Federal Minister of the Interior, Thomas de Mazière. A special committee organised by Hammarberg described a Roma camp in Kosovo as “a humanitarian catastrophe”. The Human Rights Commissioner also heavily criticised France’s mass deportation of Roma in 2010.

For his resilience and passion in the question of Roma rights, Thomas Hammarberg has been honoured by the Documentation and Cultural Centre and the Central Council of German Sinti and Roma and the Manfred Lautenschlaeger Foundation with the European Civil Rights Prize of the Sinti and Roma in Berlin on 3 April 2012.

== Publications ==
Hammarberg has published widely on various human rights issues, and particularly on the rights of the child, refugee policy, minority issues, xenophobia, islamophobia, Roma rights, LGBT rights in Europe as well as international affairs and security. He is also well known for his presentations and lectures on human rights at various intergovernmental and academic institutions. As Commissioner he has published a series of "Viewpoint" articles on human rights issues in Europe on the institution's website. He regularly publishes comments focusing on main human rights issues.

During his mandate as Council of Europe Commissioner for Human Rights, Hammarberg has visited and published reports about almost all of the Council of Europe 47 member states.

== Recognition ==
On March 9 2012, Hammarberg received the Amnesty International Chair as a reward for his impressive track record in human rights. The Amnesty Chair is organised by Amnesty International Flanders and the University of Ghent, Belgium.

Preceded by Martin Ennals	Secretary-General of Amnesty International; 1980–1986	Succeeded by Ian Martin
Preceded by Álvaro Gil-Robles	Council of Europe Commissioner for Human Rights; 2006–2012	Succeeded by Nils Muižnieks
