= Michael O'Flaherty =

Irish academic and international human rights official

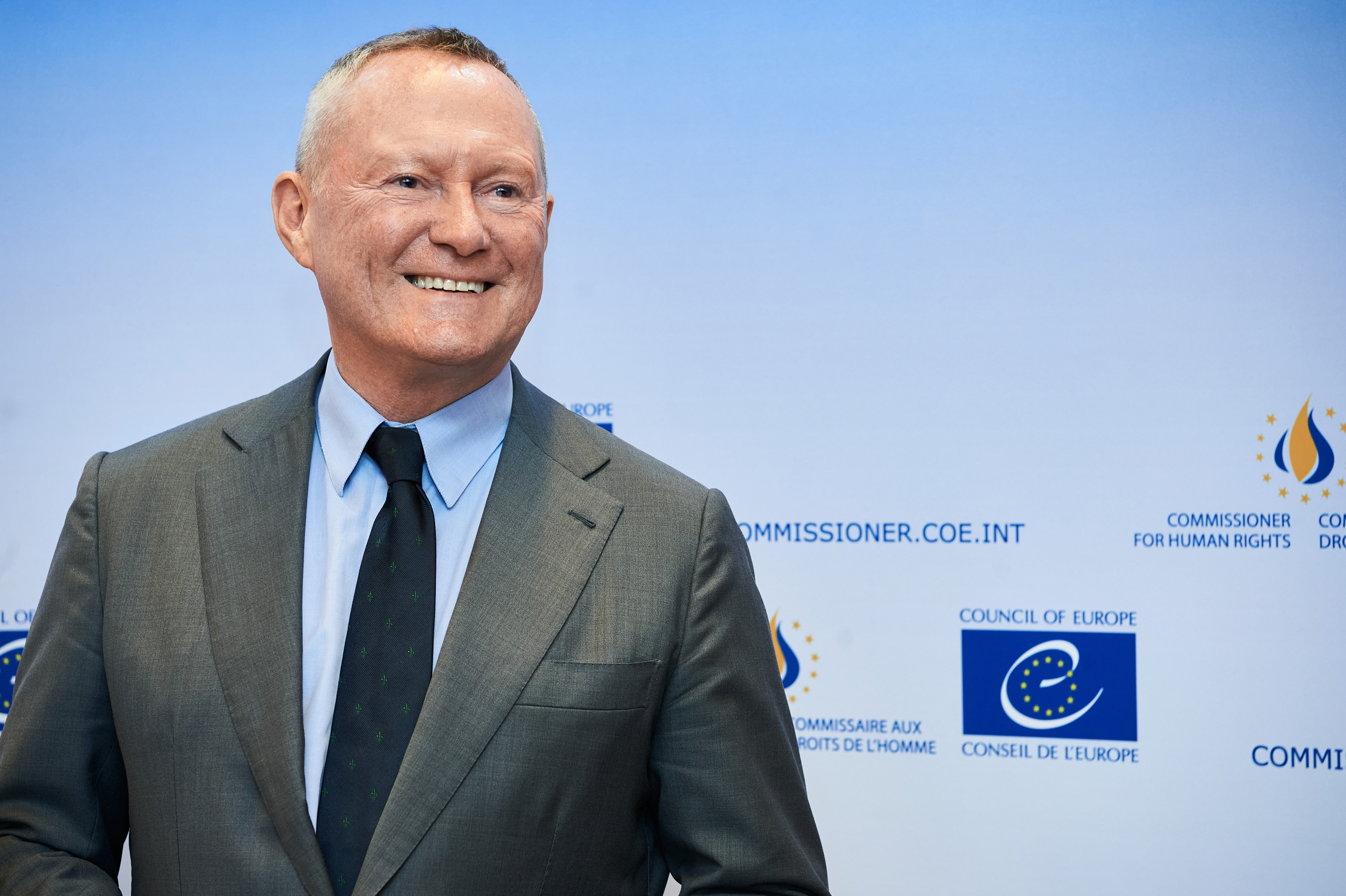
Michael O'Flaherty (2024)

Professor Michael O'Flaherty is the current Commissioner for Human Rights of the Council of Europe. He has also served as the Director of the European Union Fundamental Rights Agency (FRA) and from 2004 to 2012 as a member of the United Nations Human Rights Committee (HRC). On 19 September 2011 he took up appointment as the third Chief Commissioner of the Northern Ireland Human Rights Commission (NIHRC), the statutory national human rights institution for Northern Ireland. He resigned as chief commissioner in October 2013.

== Early life, education and honours ==
A native of Salthill in Galway, and the son and grandson of mayors of Galway, O'Flaherty attended school at Scoil Iognaid Gaillimh, Willow Park Preparatory School and Blackrock College, Dublin. He holds degrees in law from University College Dublin, in theology and philosophy from the Pontifical Gregorian University in Rome, and in international relations from the University of Amsterdam. Ordained in the 1980s as a priest in the Roman Catholic Church for the Diocese of Galway, he has not exercised priestly ministry since 1992. He has since been laicised.

In November 2019, on the basis of his published works in the field of human rights, O’Flaherty was awarded the Higher Doctorate in Laws (LLD) by the National University of Ireland In 2024, he was awarded the Grand Decoration of Honour in Gold with Star for services to the Republic of Austria.He is a Fellow of the Royal Society of the Arts (FRSA).

On 1 September 2026, University College Dublin, his Alma Mater, awarded him an honorary doctorate in law.

== Career ==
=== Career in academia ===
He qualified as a solicitor, but did not enter legal practice. Since completing his postgraduate studies he has worked mainly in the field of international human rights. From 2004 to 2012 he was Professor of Applied Human Rights and co-director of the Human Rights Law Centre at the University of Nottingham, England. In December 2012 he was appointed as Established Professor of Human Rights at the National University of Ireland, Galway and Director of the Irish Centre for Human Rights.

=== Career with the United Nations ===
Having written extensively on the ICCPR in the 1990s, O'Flaherty joined the United Nations civil service and held several headquarters and field positions in the Office of the High Commissioner for Human Rights (OHCHR). This included coordination of the OHCHR Asia and the Pacific programmes, leadership of field operations in Sierra Leone and Bosnia and Herzegovina, and (2000–02) chairing the UN reference group on human rights and humanitarian action. He served for some years as secretary to the Committee on the Elimination of Racial Discrimination, and as a senior researcher in Florence at the UNICEF child rights research unit, the Innocenti Research Centre. He was a member of the UN Expert Group on Human Rights Indicators, and has been an advisor to several intergovernmental and international non-governmental organisations, including the European Roma Rights Centre and the Council of the European Inter-University Centre for Human Rights and Democratisation.

According to a CV posted on the Council of Europe website in 2023, O’Flaherty had at that date published nine books and some 70 articles and other writings, all in the field of human rights. He was 'rapporteur' (principal drafter) for the Human Rights Committee's General Comment on Article 19 of ICCPR, finally adopted on 21 July 2011 after two years of negotiation. This major re-statement of the international law on freedom of expression emphasises the importance of media freedoms and it sets out the extent to which human rights standards relate to the new media and information platforms. O'Flaherty also has contributed to the international definition and protection of gay rights: in 2006 he led the drafting of the Yogyakarta Principles on the Application of International Human Rights Law in relation to Sexual Orientation and Gender Identity.

O'Flaherty is the former Chairperson of the Irish Penal Reform Trust and the former vice-chair of the Universal Rights Group.

=== European Union Fundamental Rights Agency, 2015–2024 ===
In September 2015 it was announced that he was appointed as Director of the European Union Fundamental Rights Agency. The FRA “delivers on its responsibility as the acknowledged, unique and independent centre of reference and excellence for the promotion and protection of the rights of everyone in the European Union”. In a speech delivered in Warsaw, Poland, on 1 December 2017, he described its activities, “(FRA) is the body tasked with delivering independent data, analysis and advice to the EU institutions, as well as its Member States, to support them in being compliant with the fundamental rights standards of the Union”.As his mandate at FRA came to a close, in late 2023, he described the work of the agency and his priorities as follows,

FRA's current priorities include supporting the human rights of: people fleeing Ukraine, migrants at EU external borders, the Roma and Jewish communities and children in the justice system; as well as the combat of racism and the development of strong human rights oversight of artificial intelligence. Other priorities during my term as director have includedstrengthening partnerships for human rights including with the faith and cultural communities; improving the communication of human rights messages and supporting the work of human rights civil society.

My establishment of the biennial Fundamental Rights Forum has facilitated the delivery of many of these priorities. The forum (…) has grown to be the largest periodic human rights gathering of the EU.

=== Council of Europe Commissioner for Human Rights, 2024–present ===
In 2024, O’Flaherty was his country's candidate to succeed Dunja Mijatović as the Council of Europe's Commissioner for Human Rights; in a vote by the Parliamentary Assembly of the Council of Europe, he defeated Meglena Kuneva and Manfred Nowak. He took over the position on 1 April 2024.

During his tenure as Commissioner, O'Flaherty has focused on the protection of civic space, the rights of Roma and Travellers, migration and asylum, freedom of expression and assembly, and the human rights implications of armed conflict. He has undertaken official visits to numerous Council of Europe member states, publishing memoranda and recommendations on issues including the administration of justice, policing, racism and discrimination, the rights of older persons, and violence against women. He has also addressed governments through public letters and third-party interventions before the European Court of Human Rights on matters concerning asylum, freedom of association, and the protection of human rights defenders. In November 2024, he presented his first annual activity report to the Committee of Ministers, outlining four priority areas for his mandate: democracy and civic space; migration and asylum; equality; and human rights institutions and defenders.

In June 2026, O'Flaherty criticized a European Commission proposal to exclude newly arriving Ukrainian men of military age from automatic temporary protection. The proposal, introduced at the request of the Ukrainian government, would apply to newly arriving men aged 23 to 60 who are subject to mobilization. O'Flaherty expressed concern that the measure reflected "mounting pressure to prematurely end temporary protection arrangements" for particular groups of displaced Ukrainians. In observations published by the Council of Europe, he argued that the continuing displacement of Ukrainians required "more solidarity, not less".
