= Dunja Mijatović =

Bosnian human rights expert and activist (born 1964)

- Дуња Мијатовић
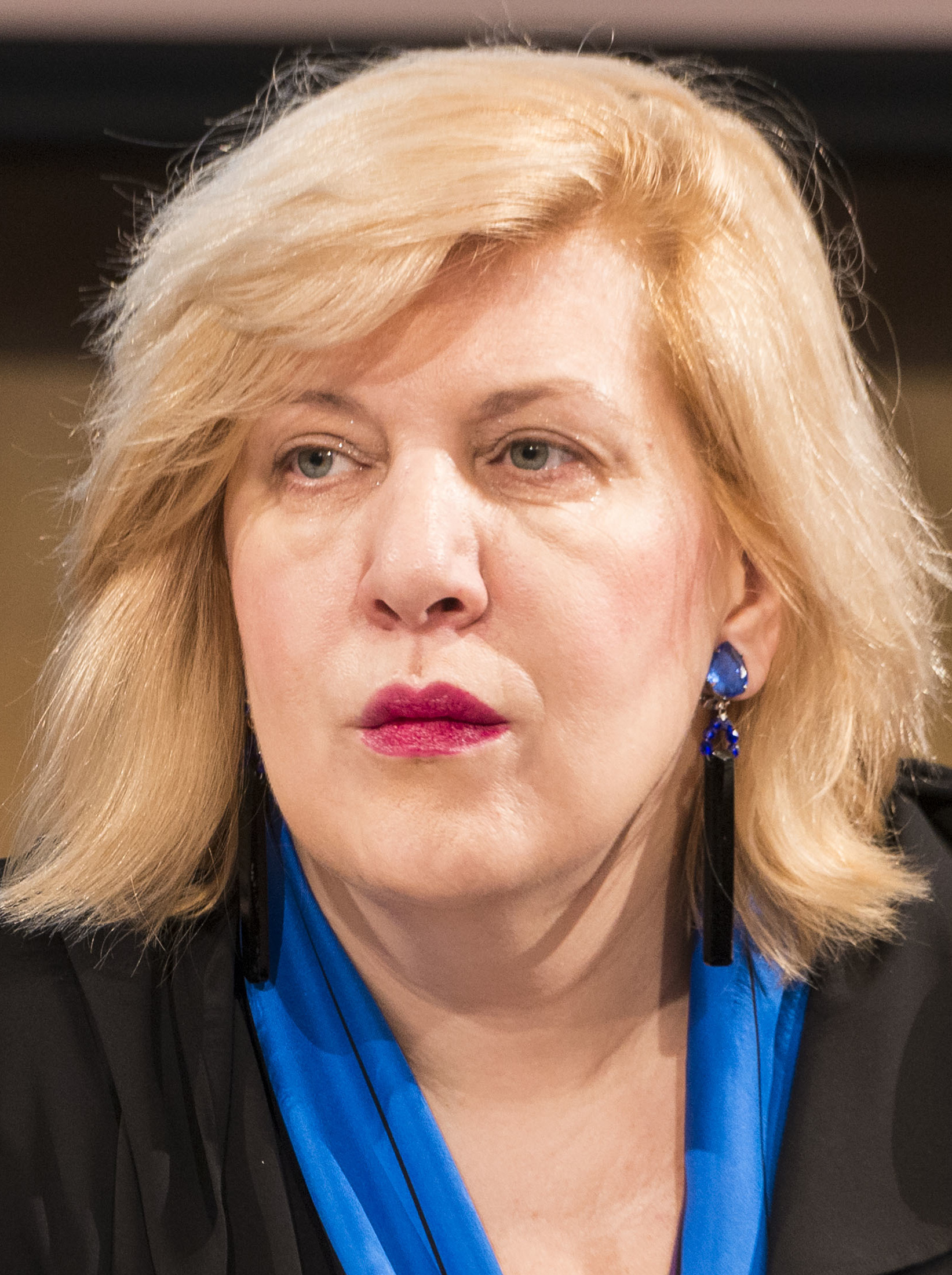
- Mijatović in 2015

Commissioner for Human Rights
- In office 1 April 2018 – 31 March 2024
- Preceded by: Nils Muižnieks
- Succeeded by: Michael O'Flaherty

Personal details
- Born: Sarajevo, SR Bosnia and Herzegovina, SFR Yugoslavia
- Education: University of Sarajevo (BS, MA)

Dunja Mijatović (Serbian Cyrillic: Дуња Мијатовић) is a Bosnian human rights expert and activist.

An expert on media law and media regulation, she served from 2010 to 2017 as the OSCE Representative on Freedom of the Media (RFoM), and as the Council of Europe Commissioner for Human Rights from 2018 to 2024.

== Early life and education ==
Having studied in a variety of countries, Mijatović earned her B.Sc. at the University of Sarajevo in 1987. She then pursued a joint M.A. in European studies at a variety of universities (University of Sarajevo, University of Sussex, University of Bologna and London School of Economics), graduating in 2002 with a Master’s thesis on "The Internet and Freedom of Expression".

Mijatović is a native speaker of Serbo-Croatian. She is also fluent in English and German and has a working knowledge of French and Russian.

== Career ==
Throughout her career, Mijatović has been engaged in media issues across a multitude of disciplines, with substantial experience in Bosnia and Herzegovina, as well as intergovernmental settings.

As early as 1998, as one of the founders of the BiH Communications Regulatory Agency, she helped create a legal, regulatory and policy framework for the media in a complex post-war society. She was also involved in setting up a self-regulatory press council and the first free media helpline in Southeast Europe.

=== EU and Council of Europe posts; lecturing at home and abroad (2007–2010) ===
In 2007, Mijatović was elected Chair of the European Platform of Regulatory Authorities, the first woman and the first person from a non-EU Member State to hold the post. Prior to that appointment, she chaired the Council of Europe's Group of Specialists on "Freedom of Expression and Information in Times of Crisis".

During her chairmanship, the CoE Committee of Ministers adopted a Declaration on the “Protection and promotion of investigative journalism” and issued Guidelines on "protecting freedom of expression and information in times of crisis.”

As an expert on media and communications legislation, she has worked in a number of countries.

In addition, she has lectured, in her home country and abroad, on various aspects of media freedom and regulation. Since 2000 she has taught media regulation at the Universities of Sarajevo and Banja Luka and, among other teaching positions, has lectured at the Academy for Political Excellence (2007-2009) and has served, since 2008, as a permanent lecturer with the joint OSCE / Ministry of Security project on "Media, Security and Hate Crime".

=== OSCE Representative on Freedom of the Media (2010–2016) ===
In 2010 Mijatović succeeded Miklós Haraszti as the OSCE Representative on Freedom of the Media (RfoM).

In accordance with the 1997 Directive that established the post, Mijatović aimed to fulfil her mandate as OSCE Representative on Freedom of the Media by observing relevant media developments in OSCE participating States, advocating and promoting full compliance with OSCE principles and commitments concerning freedom of expression and free media, and sending early warnings and implementing rapid responses in cases of non-compliance.

In March 2013 she was reappointed for a second three-year term as OSCE RFoM Representative.

=== Council of Europe Commissioner on Human Rights (2018–2024) ===
On 24 January 2018, Mijatović was elected by the Parliamentary Assembly of the Council of Europe to serve as the Council's Commissioner on Human Rights for a non-renewable term of six years. She took up her new post on 1 April 2018.

== Recognition ==
- 2015 – Médaille Charlemagne pour les Médias Européens

Preceded by Nils Muižnieks	Council of Europe Commissioner for Human Rights; 2018-present	Incumbent
