= Nicole Fontaine =

French politician (1942–2018)

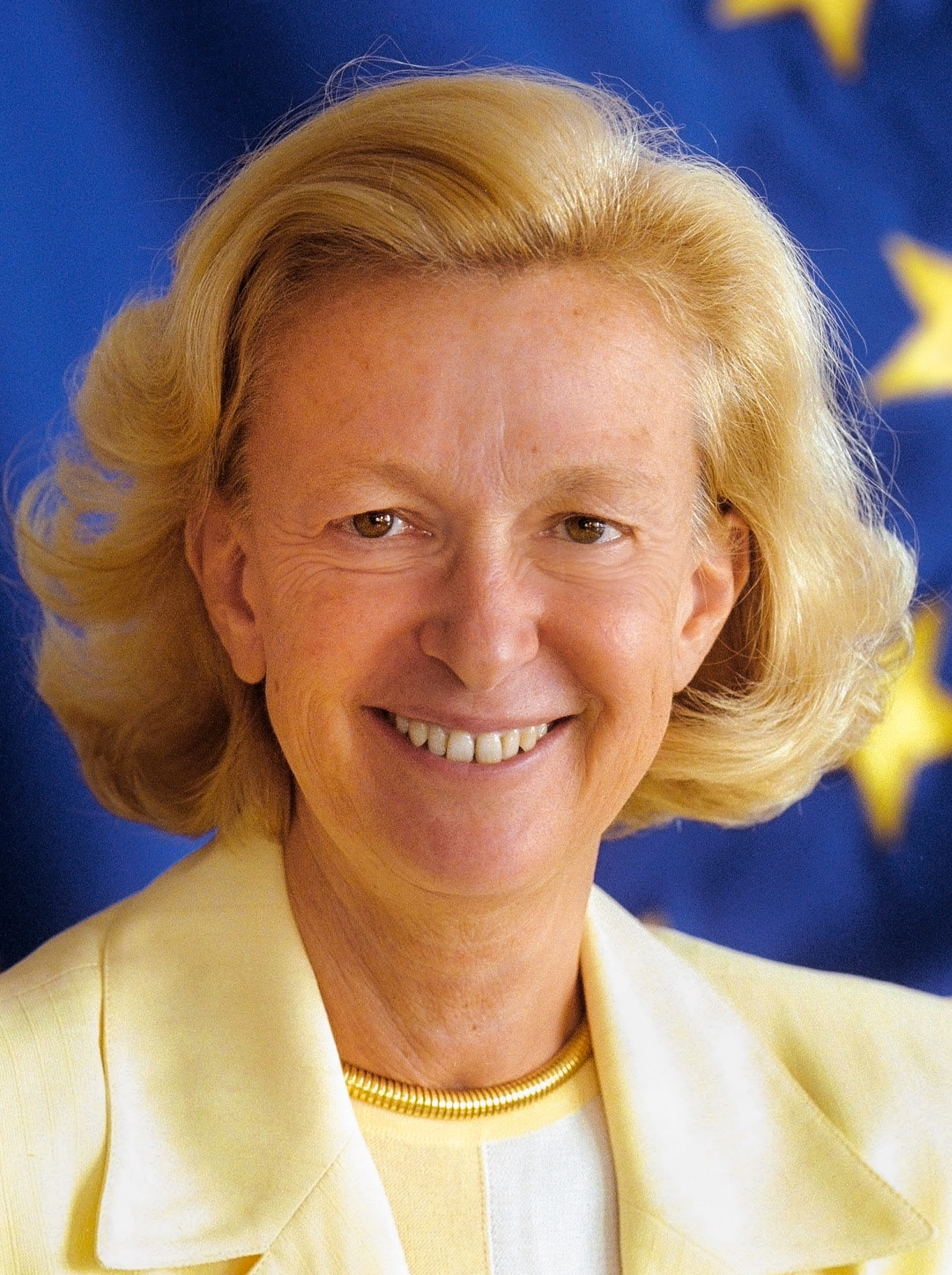
- Official portrait, 2002

President of the European Parliament
- In office 20 July 1999 – 14 January 2002
- Preceded by: José María Gil-Robles
- Succeeded by: Pat Cox

Delegated Minister for Industry
- In office 17 June 2002 – 30 March 2004
- Prime Minister: Jean-Pierre Raffarin
- Preceded by: Christian Pierret
- Succeeded by: Patrick Devedjian

Member of the European Parliament
- In office 20 July 2004 – 13 July 2009
- Constituency: Île-de-France
- In office 24 July 1984 – 16 June 2002
- Succeeded by: Fabienne Keller
- Constituency: France

Personal details
- Born: Nicole Garnier; 16 January 1942 Grainville-Ymauville, Occupied France
- Died: 17 May 2018 (aged 76) Neuilly-sur-Seine, France
- Party: UMP; EPP
- Spouse: Jean-René Fontaine
- Education: Sciences Po
- Profession: Lawyer

Nicole Fontaine (French pronunciation: [nikɔl fɔ̃tɛn]; 16 January 1942 – 17 May 2018) was a French politician who served as Member of the European Parliament for the Île-de-France from 1984 until 2002 and from 2004 until 2009. She was a member of the Union for a Popular Movement, part of the European People's Party. Fontaine was the President of the European Parliament from 1999 to 2002 and was then replaced by Pat Cox, from the European Liberal, Democrat and Reform Party, in accordance with an agreement between the two groups at the start of the term.

== Early life and education ==
Born in 1942 in Normandy, the daughter of a doctor and the granddaughter of primary school teachers, she was awarded a degree in law in 1962 at the age of 20, the diploma of the Sciences Po in 1964 and a doctorate in public law in 1969. She was a lawyer and a member of the bar of the department of Hauts-de-Seine. Republished four times and widely distributed, her doctoral thesis on relations between the State and private teaching establishments linked by contract to the public sector has become the standard reference work in that area.

== Political career ==
For almost 20 years Fontaine had national responsibility for the sensitive issue of relations between the private education sector and the public authorities at the Secrétariat général de l'Enseignement catholique (Catholic Education Secretariat), first of all as legal adviser, then as deputy secretary-general from 1972 to 1981 and finally as chief representative from 1981 to 1984. She was closely involved in discussions concerning and often the driving force behind the legislative and statutory changes which, over a period of two decades, shaped the legal framework which provides for balanced relations between the State and the private establishments linked by contract to the public education service.

Fontaine was a member of the Conseil supérior de l'Education nationale (National Education Council) from 1975 to 1981 and a member of its standing committee from 1978 to 1981. Between 1980 and 1984 she was a member of the Conseil économique et social (Economic and Social Council), to which she submitted a report on publishing policy.

=== Member of the European Parliament, 1984–2002 ===
Fontaine entered politics late in her career to become a Member of the European Parliament in the 1984 elections, in the wake of the major demonstration in Paris in favour of private education which ultimately led to a settlement based on the principle of freedom of education. During her first term of office, her work focused on an area whose importance for the future is still underestimated, given the predominance of economic issues: a citizens' Europe. In that connection, she concentrated more particularly on projects concerning youth, community life and the mutual recognition of diplomas, the key to professional mobility and freedom of establishment throughout the European Community.

She worked primarily as a member of three parliamentary committees: the Committee on Legal Affairs and Citizens' Rights, the Committee on Culture, Youth, Education and the Media, and the Committee on Women's Rights and Gender Equality.

In the 1989 elections, Fontaine was re-elected to the European Parliament on the centrist list led by Simone Veil and elected vice-president of the European Parliament. In that capacity, she was a member of Parliament's Bureau and represented the Assembly on the European Parliament - National Parliaments Joint Delegation.

In January 1994 Fontaine was appointed by her political group, the European People's Party, to sit as a permanent member on the Conciliation Committee established by the Maastricht Treaty; the role of that committee is to settle disputes outstanding at the end of legislative procedures involving the European Council of Ministers and the European Parliament. She was the only French permanent member of the committee. She was also chairman of the European Parliament delegation to the Conference of Parliamentary Committees for Union Affairs of Parliaments of the European Union (COSAC), which is the forum for cooperation between the national parliaments and the European Parliament.

In the run-up to the 1994 European Parliament election, Fontaine published a work intended to make the general public more familiar with the European Parliament, entitled Les députés européens: Qui sont-ils? Que font-ils? (MEPs: who are they? what do they do?). In June 1994 she was re-elected to the European Parliament for a third term of office. In July she was also re-elected a vice-president of the Parliament and became, by virtue of the number of votes obtained, first vice-president of the European Parliament. She retained that position in January 1997. In that capacity, she co-chaired the Conciliation Committee with the president-in-office of the Council of Ministers.

In August 1997 Fontaine published a guide to community aid schemes, entitled L'Europe de vos initiatives, and then in October 1998 a layman's guide to the Amsterdam Treaty entitled Le traité d'Amsterdam, à l'attention de ceux qui aimeraient s'intéresser à l'Europe si elle était moins obscure (the Amsterdam Treaty for those who would like to take an interest in Europe but find it difficult to understand).

At the national level, Fontaine served as vice president of the UDF and, as an ex-officio member, of the UDF's Executive Committee and Political Bureau. In second place on the list led by François Bayrou, she was re-elected to the European Parliament in June 1999.

Standing against Mário Soares for the post of President of the European Parliament, she was elected by a majority of the votes cast in the first round on 20 July 1999. She led the Parliament from 1999 to 2002. A profile by The Economist from that time described her as "a consensus-seeker, coalition-builder, conciliator ... nowhere more at home than in the Byzantine corridors of Europe, canvassing cross-party support, flashing her smile, teasing out compromise".

=== Career in the French government ===
Fontaine served as France's industrial minister between 2002 and 2004 in the government of President Jacques Chirac.

=== Member of the European Parliament, 2004–2009 ===
In her final term as a member of the European Parliament, Fontaine served on the Committee on Industry, Research and Energy and the Committee on Women's Rights and Gender Equality. In addition to her committee assignments, she was a member of the Parliament's delegation for relations with Afghanistan.

== Political positions ==
In 2007, Fontaine led an unsuccessful campaign to press for French to be designated the European Union's benchmark legal language.

== Recognition ==
Paying tribute to her, President Emmanuel Macron said: "For 35 years of her life, she fought for the European project".

== Honours ==
- Grand Cordon of the Order of Ouissam Alaouite (Morocco, 2000)
- Knight Grand Cross of the Order of Isabella the Catholic (Spain, 2002)
- Commander of the National Order of Merit (France, 2009)
- Knight of the Légion d'honneur (France, 2014)

== Notes ==
Political offices
Preceded by José María Gil-Robles	President of the European Parliament; 1999–2002	Succeeded by Pat Cox
