= José María Gil-Robles =

Spanish politician (1935–2023)

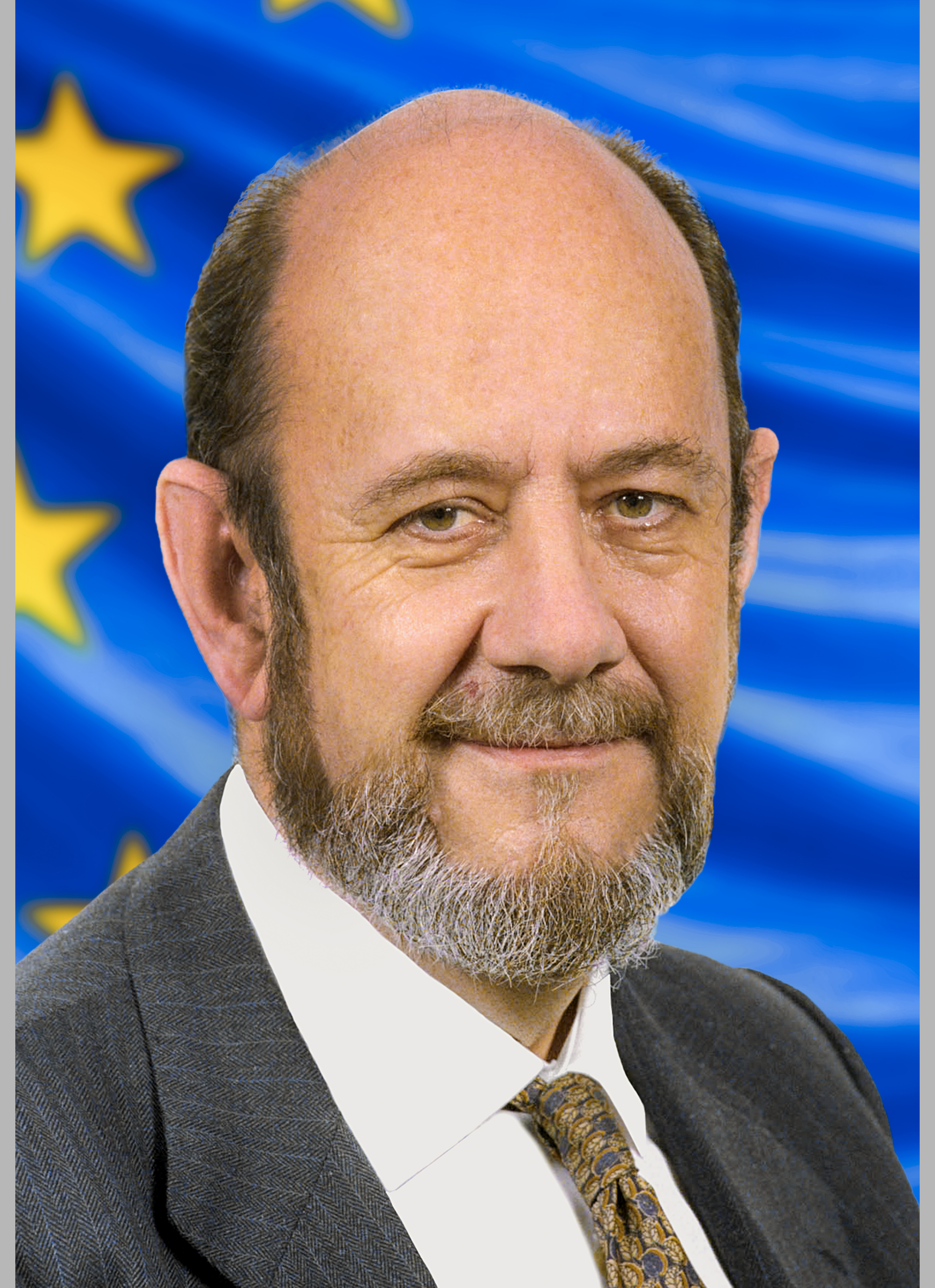
- Official portrait, 1997

President of the European Parliament
- In office 14 January 1997 – 20 July 1999
- Preceded by: Klaus Hänsch
- Succeeded by: Nicole Fontaine

Personal details
- Born: 17 June 1935 Madrid, Spain
- Died: 13 February 2023 (aged 87) Madrid
- Party: EPP
- Parent: José María Gil-Robles y Quiñones (father)

José María Gil-Robles y Gil-Delgado (17 June 1935 – 13 February 2023) was a Spanish lawyer and politician. He was a Member of the European Parliament in the European People's Party group, and was President of the European Parliament from 1997 to 1999.

== Early life ==
José María Gil-Robles was born on 17 June 1935 in Madrid, during the Spanish Second Republic. He was the son of José María Gil-Robles y Quiñones, leader of the CEDA and a prominent figure in the period leading up to the Spanish Civil War, and Carmen Gil-Delgado Armada. He was the grandson of Carlist theorist Enrique Gil Robles and brother of Álvaro Gil-Robles, who was the second Ombudsman of Spain between 1988 and 1993.

Due to the Civil War, the family went into exile in Estoril, Portugal. Gil-Robles, in 1953, returned to Spain to study Law at the University of Deusto, from which he graduated with an Extraordinary Prize. In 1959 he became a lawyer in the Francoist Courts, a position he held during the Spanish transition to democracy and the democratic Congress of the Deputies. He was also editor of the "Boletín de Legislación extranjera" (Foreign Legislation Bulletin) and between 1959 and 1964 he was a professor of Political Law at the Complutense University of Madrid. Between 1959 and 1997 and from 1999 onwards he practiced law and since 1974 he has published several legal works related to the restoration of democracy and to parliamentary and public law. In 2004, Gil-Robles obtained the "Jean Monnet" Chair at the Complutense University of Madrid.

== Political career ==
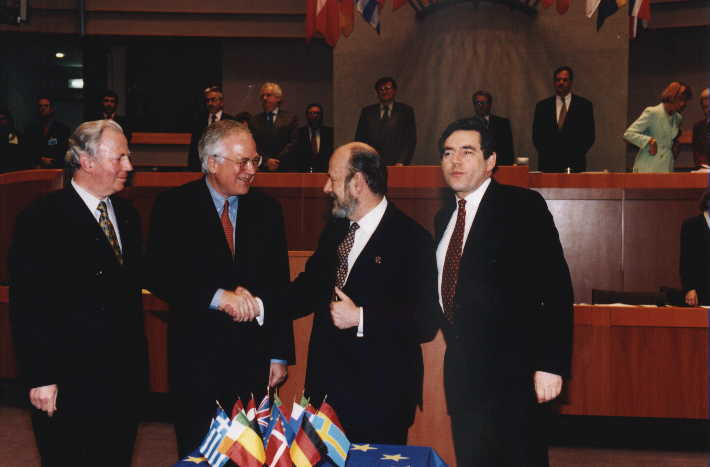
Gil-Robles (second from right) in 1998.

In 1989, and after the re-foundation of People's Party, Marcelino Oreja asked Gil-Robles to accompany him in the candidacy for the 1989 European Parliament election. Gil-Robles was elected member of the European Parliament in the elections that took place in July, as part of the European People's Party, party of which he was vice-president between 1990 and 1992.

In 1994, after being re-elected MEP in the 1994 election, he was appointed Vice-President of the European Parliament, a position he held until 1997. In January of that year he was elected President of the European Parliament after obtaining a large majority of 338 votes, office he held until 1999. This position allowed him to play a key role in the negotiation of the Treaty of Amsterdam of 1997, treaty that expanded the powers of the European Parliament. He also oversaw the beginning of negotiations of the accession of new state members to the European Union, and the approval of the Agenda 2000. He also had to manage the institutional crisis after the resignation of the Santer Commission.

In the 1999 European Parliament election Gil-Robles was reelected member of the European Parliament and succeeded on 20 July by Nicole Fontaine as its president. He did not stand for the 2004 elections.

Gil-Robles was president of the Jean Monnet Foundation for Europe between 2009 and 2014.

== Personal life and death ==
He was married to Magdalena Casanueva, with whom he had four children.

Gil-Robles died on 13 February 2023, at the age of 87.

== Honours ==
- Robert Schuman Medal, EPP Group (1995).
- Grand Cross of the Order of Isabella the Catholic (2000). and the Grand Cross of Civil Merit (Spain).

Political offices
Preceded by Klaus Hänsch	President of the European Parliament; 1997–1999	Succeeded by Nicole Fontaine
