= Commissioner for Human Rights =

Human Rights protector

Council of Europe Commissioner for Human Rights
- Formation: May 7, 1999
- Headquarters: Strasbourg
- Leader: Michael O'Flaherty
- Parent organization: Council of Europe
- Website: Homepage

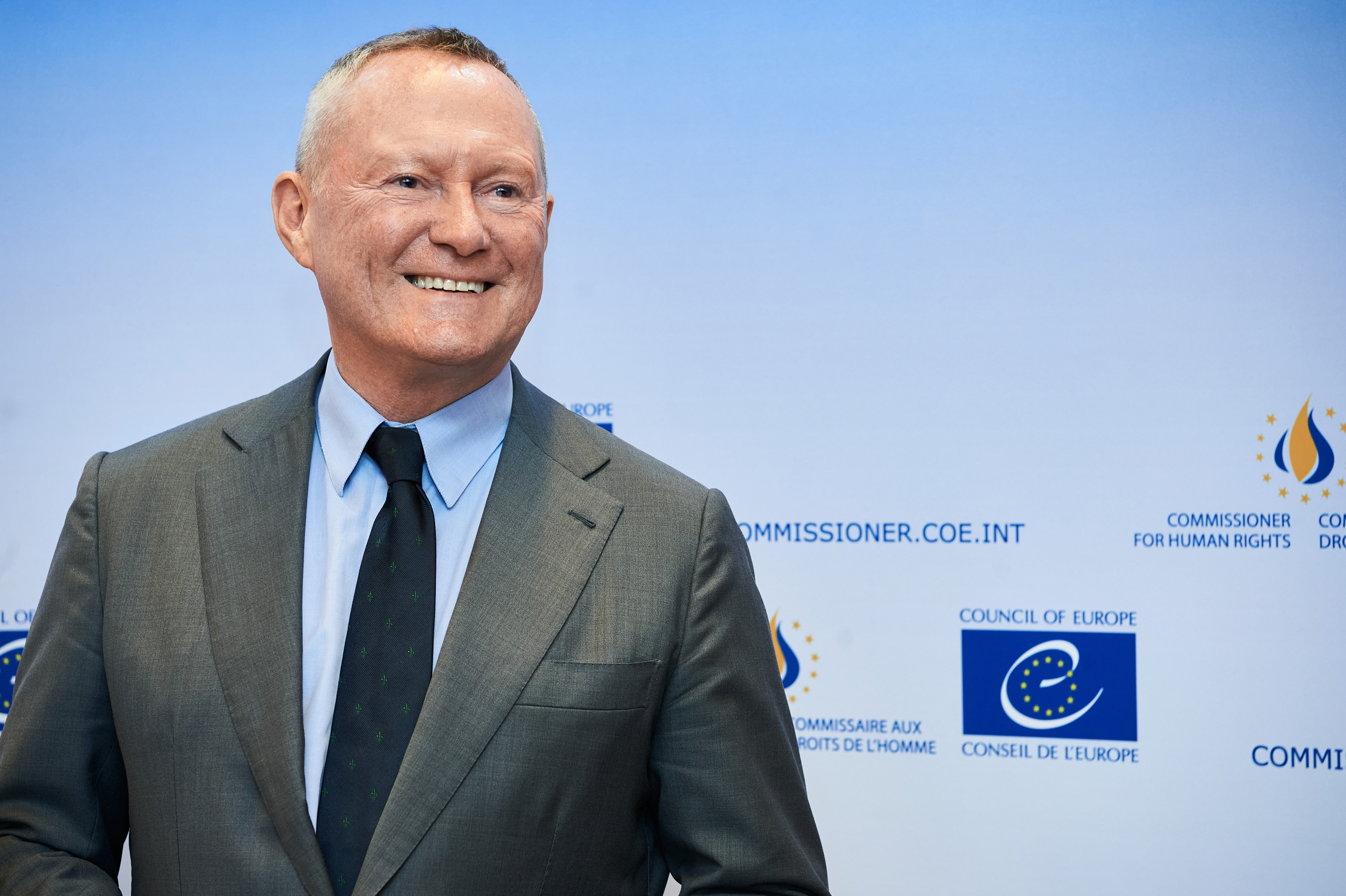
The current commissioner, Michael O'Flaherty

The Council of Europe commissioner for human rights is an independent and impartial non-judicial institution established in 1999 by the Strasbourg-based Council of Europe, to promote awareness of and respect for human rights in the council's 46 member states. The activities of commissioner focus on three major, closely related areas:

- country visits and dialogue with national authorities and civil society;
- thematic studies and advice on systematic human rights work;
- awareness-raising activities.

The current commissioner is Michael O'Flaherty, who began his six-year term on April 1, 2024. The previous commissioners were Álvaro Gil-Robles, Thomas Hammarberg, Nils Muižnieks and Dunja Mijatović.

Elected by the Parliamentary Assembly of the Council of Europe, the commissioner seeks to engage in permanent dialogue with member states, continually raising awareness about human rights issues, and promoting the development of national human rights structures. The commissioner conducts visits to each member state for an evaluation of the human rights situation, and issues reports, opinions and recommendations to governments.

The commissioner also co-operates with a broad range of partners, including the European Union, the United Nations and its specialized offices, as well as leading human rights NGOs, universities and think tanks.

== Mandate ==
The mandate of the commissioner is based on the resolution (99) 50 of the Council of Europe (adopted on May 7, 1999). It includes the following points:

*foster the effective observance of human rights, and assist member states in the implementation of Council of Europe human rights standards;

- promote education in and awareness of human rights in Council of Europe member states;
- identify possible shortcomings in the law and practice concerning human rights;
- facilitate the activities of national ombudsperson institutions and other human rights structures; and
- provide advice and information regarding the protection of human rights across the region.

The member states are obliged to "facilitate the Commissioner's contacts, including travel, in the context of the mission of the Commissioner and provide in good time information requested by the Commissioner". While the commissioner "shall function independently and impartially." The commissioner may act "on any information relevant to the Commissioner's functions".

The commissioner "may directly contact governments of member States of the Council of Europe". The commissioner may also "issue recommendations, opinions and reports."

The commissioner enjoys immunity "from arrest and all legal proceedings in the territories of all members, in respect of words spoken and votes cast".

Article 36 of the European Convention on Human Rights allows "third party intervention" before the European Court of Human Rights for the commissioner stating that "In all cases before a Chamber or the Grand Chamber, the Council of Europe commissioner for human rights may submit written comments and take part in hearings.

== Election ==
The commissioner is elected by the Parliamentary Assembly of the Council of Europe, from a list of three candidates drawn up by the Committee of Ministers, and serves a non-renewable term of office of six years. According to the Resolution (99) 50:

The candidates shall be eminent personalities of a high moral character having recognised expertise in the field of human rights, a public record of attachment to the values of the Council of Europe and the personal authority necessary to discharge the mission of the commissioner effectively. During his or her term of office, the commissioner shall not engage in any activity which is incompatible with the demands of a full-time office.

== Activities ==
Country visits and dialogue with national authorities and civil society

The commissioner carries out visits to all member states to monitor and evaluate the human rights situation. In the course of such visits, he meets with the highest representatives of government, parliament, the judiciary, civil society and national human rights structures. He also talks to ordinary people with human rights concerns, and visits places of human rights relevance, including prisons, psychiatric hospitals, centres for asylum seekers, schools, orphanages and settlements populated by vulnerable groups including Romani, LGBT people and other minority group.

Following the visits, a report or a letter may be addressed to the authorities of the country concerned containing an assessment of the human rights situation and recommendations on how to overcome shortcomings in law and practice. The commissioner also has the right to intervene as a third party in the proceedings of the European Court of Human Rights, either by submitting written information or taking part in its hearings.

Thematic reporting and advising on human rights systematic implementation

The commissioner also conducts thematic work on subjects central to the protection of human rights in Europe. He provides advice and information on the prevention of human rights violations and releases opinions, Issue Papers and reports.

Awareness-raising activities
The commissioner promotes awareness of human rights in member states, by organising and taking part in seminars and events on various human rights themes. The commissioner engages in permanent dialogue with governments, civil society organisations and educational institutions in order to improve public awareness of human rights standards. He further contributes to the debate and the reflection on current and important human rights matters through contacts with the media, the publication of periodic articles and thematic documents.

As part of country visits, thematic work and awareness raising activities, the commissioner pays a specific attention to the defence of human rights activists and engages in close co-operation with other Council of Europe bodies and with a broad range of international institutions, most importantly the United Nations and its specialised offices, the European Union and the Organization for Security and Co-operation in Europe (OSCE). The office also cooperates closely with national human rights structures, leading human rights NGOs, universities and think tanks.

== See also ==
- Human rights in Europe
- European Commission against Racism and Intolerance
- United Nations special rapporteur
