= Tomás Cámara y Castro =

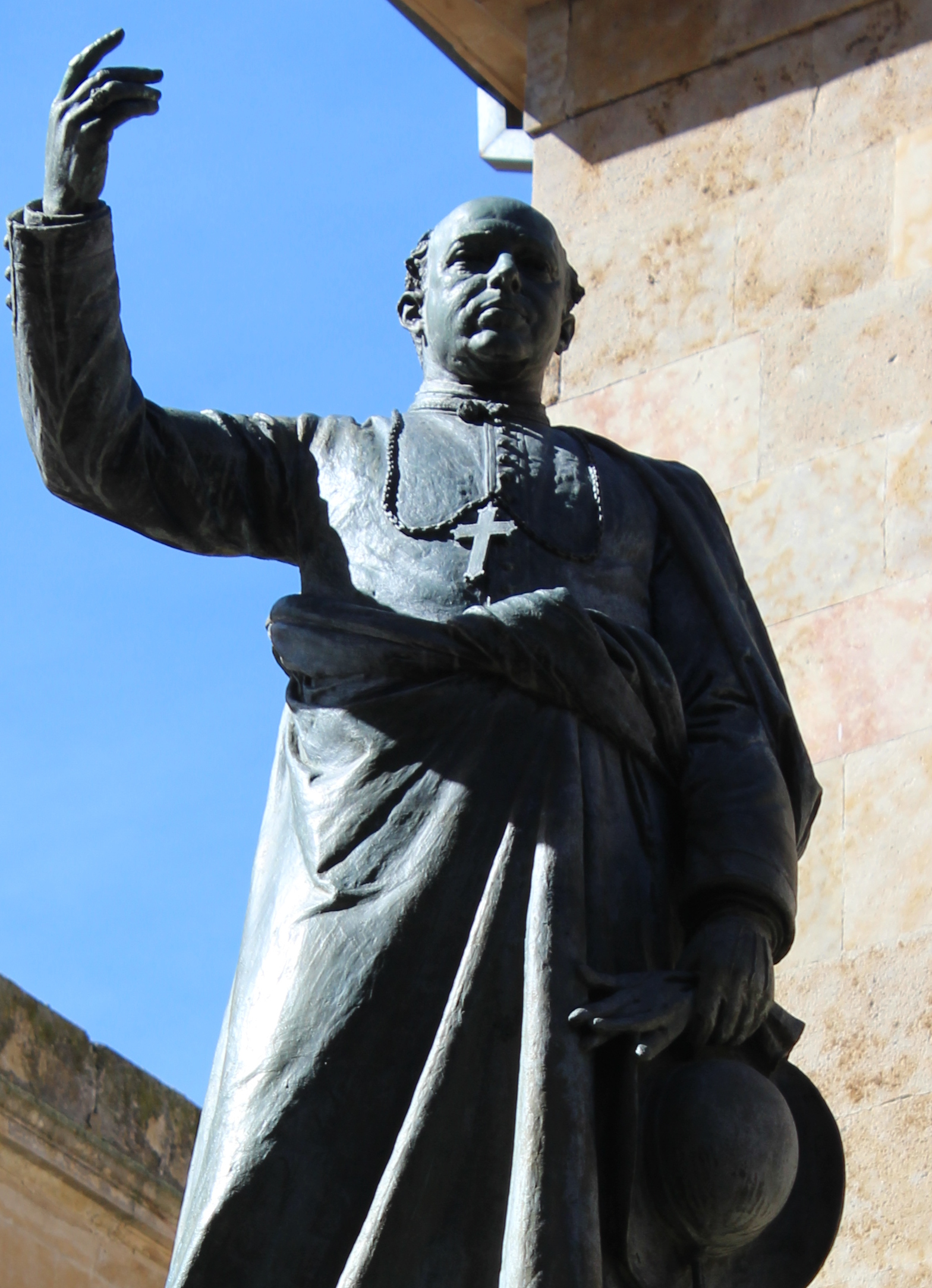
Monument of Tomás Cámara y Castro

Tomás Cámara y Castro, was a Catholic bishop of Salamanca, Spain.

== Biography ==
Cámara was born at Torrecilla de Cameros, Logroño on September 19, 1847. His father, D. Leonardo Cámara, was a physician in this town.

Cámara studied humanities at Burgos, and at the age of fifteen took the habit of the Augustinians at Valladolid, where he finished his theology and was appointed professor in the college. His activity was inexhaustible, and among the many works which he accomplished during his episcopate were the foundation in Salamanca of the Colegio de Calatrava for the promotion of ecclesiastical courses, the erection of a handsome church to San Juan de Sahagún, patron of the city, and of six smaller churches in other cities.

Cámara was primarily a polemicist and orator. His great learning, extraordinary talents, varied interests, and untiring activity made him one of the most prominent figures of the Spanish episcopate during the 19th century. No great work was undertaken for the Catholic Church in which he did not figure in the foremost rank, in posts of danger and enterprises of the greatest importance, making him beloved by the Catholics and feared by the enemies of the Church. In congresses, assemblies, the Senate, the press, and in every situation where noble and sacred interests were to be safeguarded, he was to be found. His Lenten conferences, preached in 1884 and 1885, were attended by a representative audience of the most distinguished men of letters, politics, sciences, and arts.

Cámara died at Villaharta on May 17, 1904.

== Works ==
Cámara was a prolific author. His writings include:

- Contestación á la historia del conflicto entre la religión y la ciencia de Juan Guillermo Draper (3 editions)
- Vida y escritos del Beato Alonso de Orozco, del Orden de San Agustín, Predicador de Felipe II
- Conferencias y demás discursos hasta hoy publicados del Ilmo. P. Cámara, Obispo de Salamanca
- Vida de S. Juan de Sahagún, del Orden de S. Agustín, Patrón de Salamanca
- La Venerable Sacramento, Vizcondesa de Jorbalán, Fundadora de las Señoras Adoratrices
