= European Commission against Racism and Intolerance =

Anti-racist organizations in Europe

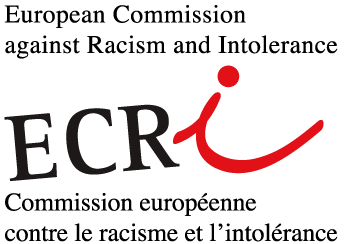
Logo of ECRI

European Commission against Racism and Intolerance (ECRI) is the Council of Europe's independent human rights monitoring body specialised in combating antisemitism, discrimination, racism, religious intolerance, and xenophobia. It publishes periodic reports on CoE member states and general policy recommendations. The decision to found ECRI was adopted in 1993. The organization became officially active as of March 1994.

== Members ==
ECRI consists of 46 experts, one from every CoE member state. The chair of the commission is Maria Daniella Marouda from Greece, since 2020. Each ECRI member is allowed a renewable term of five years through appointing by their respective governments. To maintain membership, they must also abide by these terms of the ECRI Statute:

The members of ECRI shall have high moral authority and recognised expertise in dealing with racism, racial discrimination, xenophobia, antisemitism, and intolerance; The members of ECRI shall serve in their individual capacity, shall be independent and impartial in fulfilling their mandate. They shall not receive any instructions from their government.

The first ECRI chair was the Swedish Discrimination Ombudsman Frank Orton, who held the position until 1998. It was his idea that the commission should undertake its now well-known country-by-country studies, aimed at providing the member states with country-specific advice how to combat racism and related intolerance.

Former ECRI chairs include Nikos Frangakis, Michael Head, Eva Smith Asmussen and Nils Muižnieks.

== Actions ==
The main purpose of the ECRI is to provide a constructive critique, called a General Policy Report (GPR), to countries on their actions and legislature to improve the welfare of the minority groups residing within the nation. The ECRI also pens its reports itself, and not the country being examined, which differentiates it from CERD at the United Nations.

Merja Pentikäinen relays the ECRI's desire for immigrants and resident non-EU citizens' full integration and participation in EU societies. In particular, the ECRI is a strong advocate of the integration of the Romani people in European society and Romani children in EU school systems. In fact, the Romani are the main objects of attention in most of the organization's calls for integration. However, while racism and discrimination have always been a large part of the ECRI agenda, integration has only started to make prominent appearances in recent GPRs.

== See also ==
- Commissioner for Human Rights
- Environmental injustice in Europe
- Fundamental Rights Agency
