= José María Gil-Robles y Quiñones =

Spanish politician

José María Gil-Robles
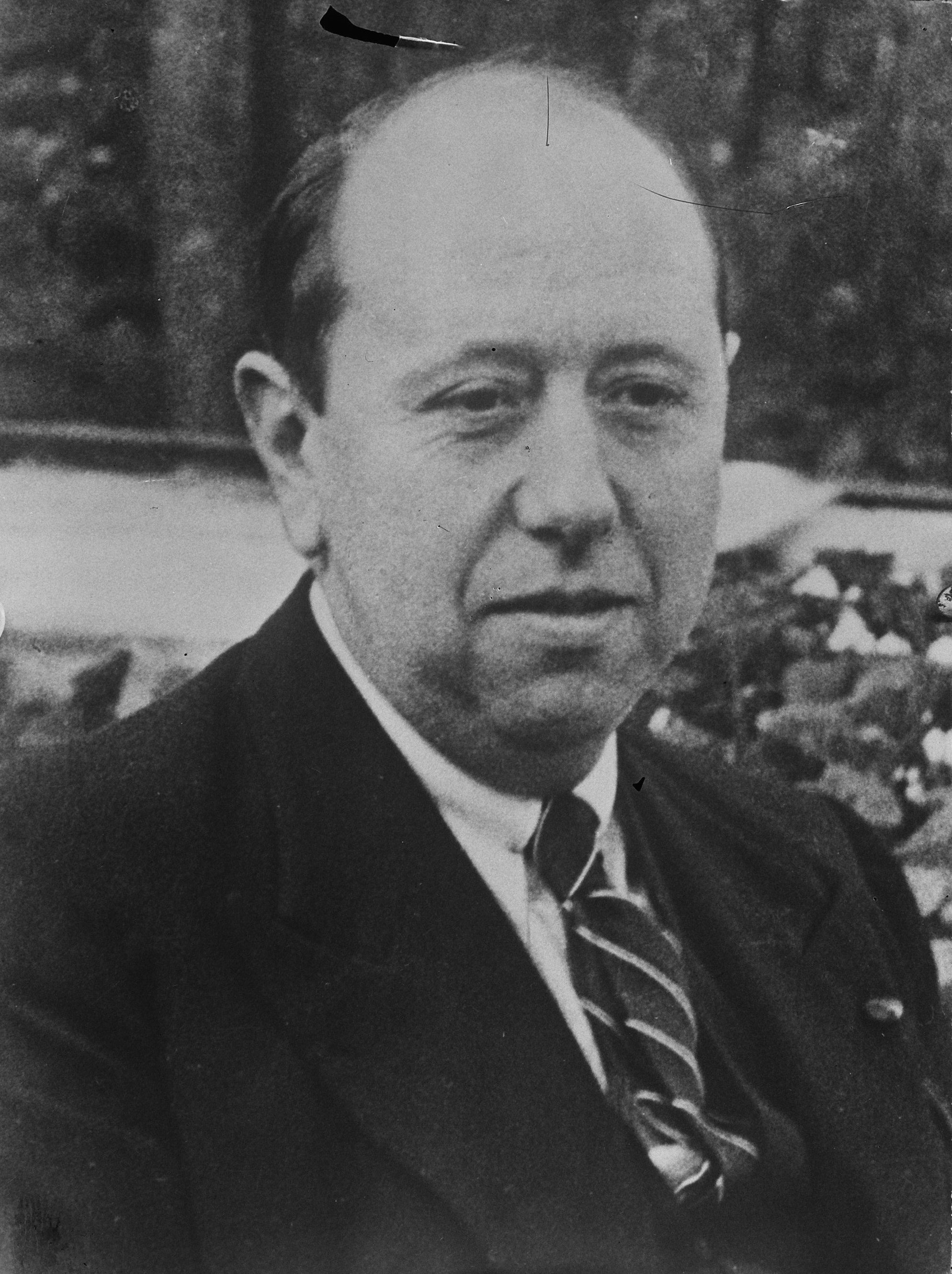
- Gil-Robles in 1962

Leader of the Confederación Española de Derechas Autónomas
- In office November 1933 – 19 April 1937

Member of the Cortes Generales
- In office 28 June 1931 – 17 July 1936
- Constituency: Salamanca

Minister of War of Spain
- In office 6 May 1935 – 14 December 1935
- President: Niceto Alcalá-Zamora
- Prime Minister: Alejandro Lerroux; Joaquín Chapaprieta
- Preceded by: Carlos Masquelet
- Succeeded by: Nicolás Molero

Personal details
- Born: José María Gil-Robles y Quiñones de León; November 27, 1898 Salamanca, Spain
- Died: September 13, 1980 (aged 81) Madrid, Spain
- Party: CEDA (1933–1937); Christian Democratic Party (1977)
- Spouse: Carmen Gil-Delgado Armada
- Children: José María Gil-Robles; Álvaro Gil-Robles
- Parent(s): Enrique Gil Robles (father); Petra Quiñones Armesto (mother)

José María Gil-Robles y Quiñones de León (Salamanca, 27 November 1898 – Madrid, 13 September 1980) was a Spanish politician, leader of the CEDA, Spain's first mass and modern right-wing party, and a prominent figure in the period leading up to the Spanish Civil War. Under his leadership at the age of 34, CEDA became the largest political party in the second republican Cortes (1933–1935) with just over one quarter of the seats.

Continually denied the invitation to form government, he served as Minister of War from May to December 1935 (under President Niceto Alcalá-Zamora), where he promoted Generals Emilio Mola and Francisco Franco to influential positions. In the 1936 elections, the CEDA was defeated, and support for Gil-Robles and his party evaporated. Gil-Robles was unwilling to struggle with Francisco Franco for power and in April 1937, he announced the dissolution of CEDA, and went into exile during the years 1936-1953 and again from 1962-1964. Abroad, he negotiated with Spanish monarchists to try to arrive at a common strategy for taking power in Spain.

After returning to Spain, in 1964, he was named a professor of the University of Oviedo and published his memoir No fue posible la paz ('Peace Was Not Possible') with a thesis that despite his efforts to operate within the constitutional framework of the Republic, structural and ideological extremism on both the left and right made a peaceful, democratic resolution impossible.

After the death of Franco and the end of his regime, Gil-Robles became one of the leaders of the "Spanish Christian Democracy" party, which however failed to win support in the Spanish general elections in 1977.

== Biography ==
=== Early life ===
José Maria Gil-Robles was born in Salamanca on 27 November 1898. He was the son of Enrique Gil Robles, a conservative Spanish law scholar and a Carlist theorist, whose ancestors were hidalgos from León. Carlism was a reactionary and traditionalist political movement in Spain whose goal was to establishing an alternative branch of the Bourbon dynasty.

José María Gil-Robles received his master's degree in 1919, and in 1922, he gained by examination the chair of political law in the University of La Laguna (Tenerife).

=== Politics ===
He supported the coup d'etat of Miguel Primo de Rivera and during the dictatorship he was secretary of the Catholic-Agrarian National Confederation and member of the Writing Council of El Debate.Gil-Robles held the view, in the 1920s, that political parties and the constitutional that empowered them were anti-social and anti-national. Nonetheless, after the declaration of the Second Spanish Republic, he participated in and led the Acción Nacional (National Action) party, later renamed Acción Popular (Popular Action).

In the elections of 1931, he was chosen as a deputy in the Cortes for Salamanca. During the period of the Republic, he maintained the posture of "accidentalism": whether Spain was a monarchy or republic was less important than the law's compatibility with religious principles. While rejecting fascism as “pagan” and “totalitarian” he copied fascist styles like its nationalist populism, leadership cult and youth wing.

Gil-Robles saw the actions of the first Republican government to terminate the Church’s centuries-old privileges, as religious persecution and so mobilised Catholic voters in the elections of 1933.

=== Leader of CEDA ===
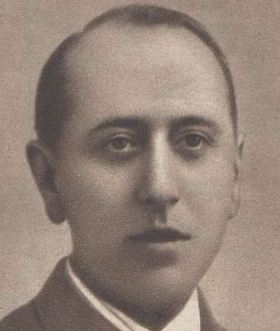
Gil-Robles in 1933

Gil-Robles formed the Spanish Confederation of the Autonomous Right (CEDA), a conservative Catholic party, the political heir to Ángel Herrera Oria's Acción Popular and fought for the "affirmation and defence of the principles of Christian civilization" and a political goal to replace liberal democracy by a corporatist order.

CEDA won the largest number of seats in elections of November 1933, and Gil-Robles was thus the head of the largest party in the Cortes with one quarter of the seats. However, to deny parties that were not explicitly republican and to avoid conflicts with leftist parties, President Niceto Alcalá-Zamora invested Alejandro Lerroux, leader of the Radical Republican Party, as prime minister instead of Gil-Robles. As a minority government, it depended on the support of CEDA for passing legislation and in return CEDA demanded public financial assistance for church, an amnesty for those involved in the 1932 coup against the Republic, and later, attempted to enforce death sentences on the leftist leaders of the Revolution of 1934.

The appointment of three CEDA ministers to the cabinet in 1934, triggered a general strike which developed into the 'left wing uprisings of 1934. In his memoirs he admits to deliberately provoking the left to help cause the uprising.

While Minister of War from May to December 1935, he promoted General Francisco Franco to Chief of General Staff and tasked General Mola to prepare plans for using the colonial army on mainland Spain before promoting him to military command of the Moroccan protectorate. However he withdrew from the government when he thought his time had come to be prime minister, but this proved a mistake and elections were soon called instead.

=== 1936 elections, defeat and uprising ===
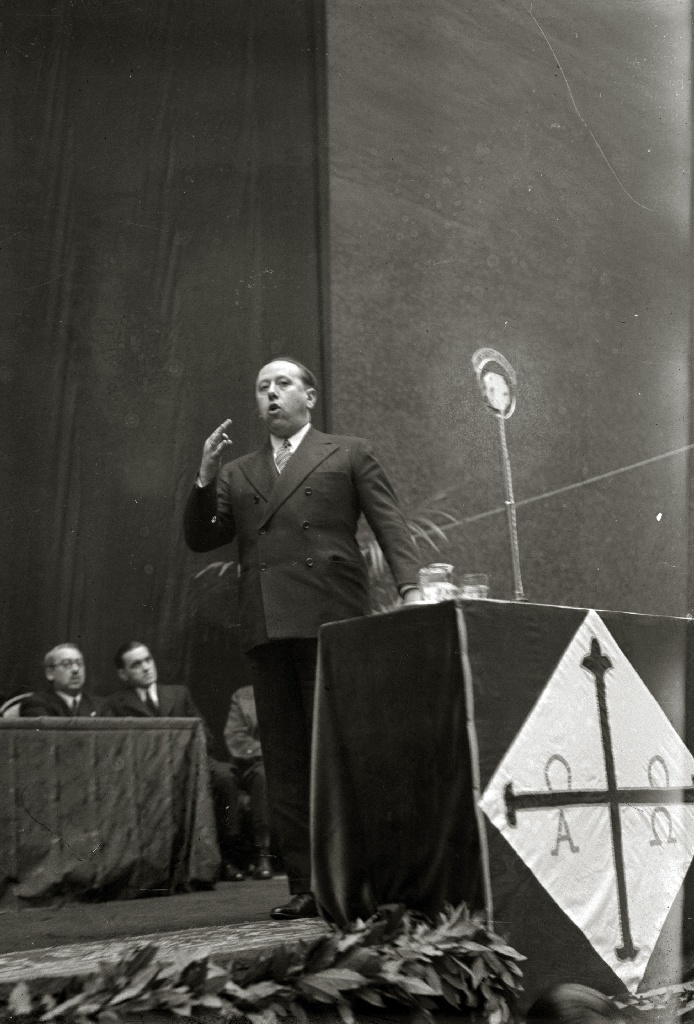
Gil-Robles (front) at a CEDA rally at the Frontón Urumea in San Sebastián in 1935

During the February 1936 Spanish general election, the CEDA formed the largest part of the National Front coalition, which also included Alfonsine monarchists and Carlists. Gil-Robles campaigned under the slogan Todo el poder para el Jefe ("All the power to the Chief"), and while he himself was reelected to the Cortes, the conservative National Front narrowly lost the election, with power swinging to the left. The CEDA itself lost ground, winning 88 seats, fewer than the 115 it had won in 1933.

Nevertheless in the early hours of the day after the election, Gil Robles worked with Franco to have martial law imposed without success.

Following the narrow victory of the leftist Popular Front and the defeat of the CEDA, support for Gil-Robles and his party declined, losing both votes and membership to the Falange party, founded in 1934, whose share of the vote had been very small in the 1936 elections. Bitterly disillusioned with the failure of their jefe to win the election, the CEDA's youth group Juventudes de Acción Popular went over en masse to the Falange.

In the following months and in the volatile situation that arose, Gil-Robles was well aware that a coup was being prepared against the government. Despite his later insistence that he had no part in the coup, the CEDA leader was kept informed of each stage of the plot, and members of his party played important liaison roles, facilitating contact between military and civilian plotters. Gil-Robles himself authorized the transfer of 500,000 pesetas of CEDA electoral funds to General Emilio Mola's military insurgents.

=== Civil War ===
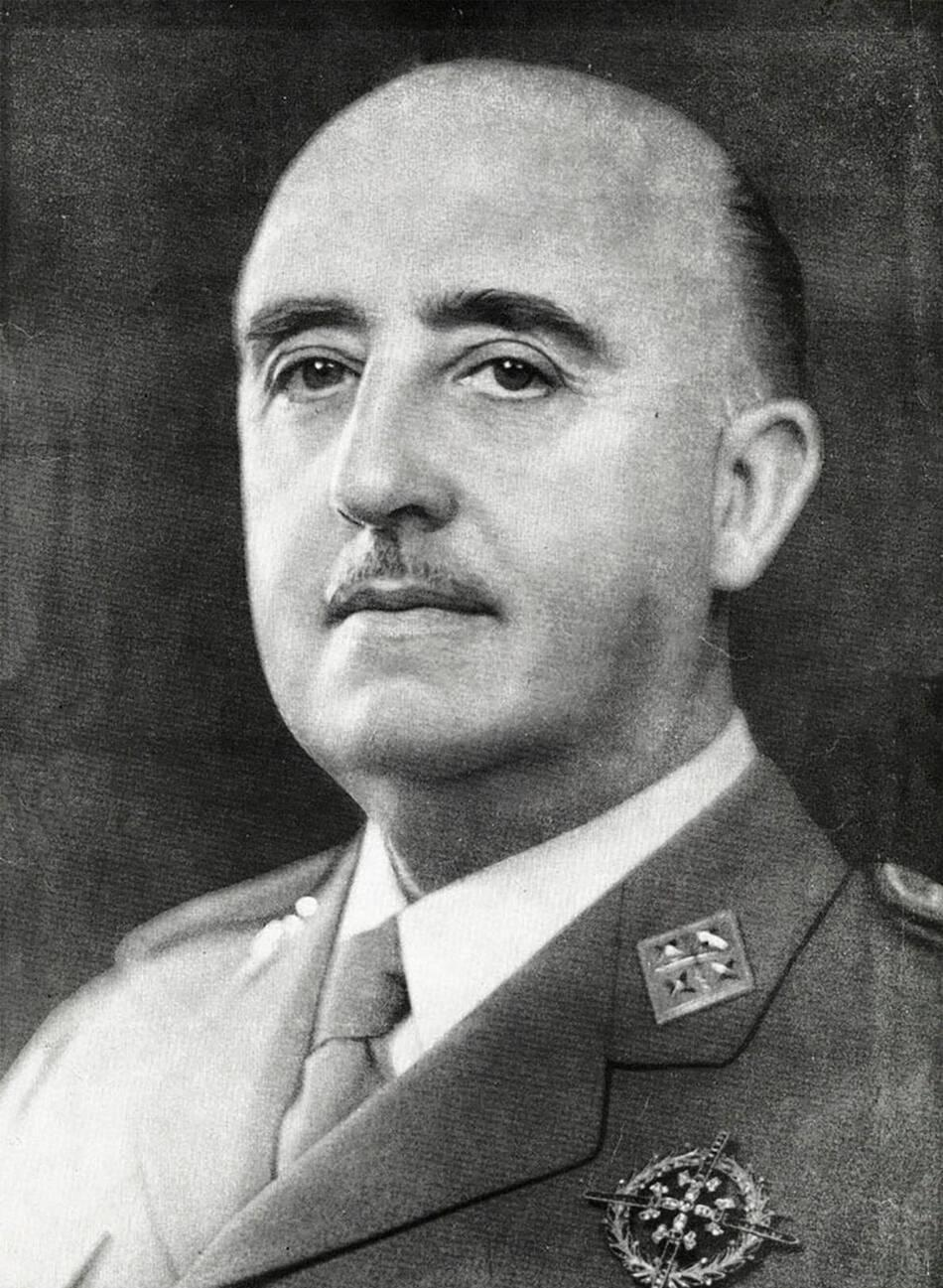
General Franco, Gil-Robles' rival for power

With the beginning of the Spanish Civil War, following the uprising on 17 July 1936, Gil-Robles found himself unwilling or unable to struggle with Francisco Franco for power. Franco himself was determined not to have competing right-wing parties in Spain, and in April 1937, following the Unification Decree issued by Generalissimo Franco, Gil-Robles announced the dissolution of CEDA. After the Civil War, although offered the ambassadorship to Washington by Franco, Gil-Robles declined and went into exile. Abroad, he negotiated with Spanish monarchists to try to arrive at a common strategy for taking power in Spain.

=== Later life ===
In 1968, he was named a professor of the University of Oviedo and published his book No fue posible la paz ('Peace Was Not Possible').

After the death of Franco and the end of his regime, Gil-Robles became one of the leaders of the Spanish Christian Democracy party, which won little support in the Spanish general elections in 1977.

== Family ==
Gil-Robles' son, José María Gil-Robles, was born on 17 June 1935, in Madrid. Like his father, he entered politics, serving as a member of the European Parliament in the European People's Party group, and as President of the European Parliament from 1997 to 1999.

== Legacy ==
Gil-Robles is a unique and controversial figure in the history of Spanish politics. The nature of his political beliefs during the Second Republic either greatly fluctuated or were tailored to his audience, as he is recorded as making many statements that appear contradictory. This is certainly reflected in the nature of his party, the CEDA, which attracted support from both moderate Catholic republicans and avowed right-wing monarchists.

=== Judgment of historians ===
The controversy surrounding him has been best articulated by the historians Paul Preston and Richard Robinson:

- Preston believes that Gil-Robles was essentially a legalist fascist, whose policy of accidentalism would give way to legislating for a fascist dictatorship when he was confident that the populace was controllable. His evidence references Gil Robles' speeches, which were often filled with "anti-liberal and anti-Semitic innuendo", the oppressive, anti-reformist nature of his government partnership with Alejandro Lerroux's Radicals, and the frank admiration offered to foreign fascist regimes by both his propaganda and by his press organ, El Debate. Burnett Bolloten argues Robles was aware of the planned coup and July 1936, he turned over half a million peseta's from CEDA's funds to the generals. However, Bolloten does observe that his support was given in a rather reluctant manner, conditional upon the knowledge that CEDA was disintegrating by this time and he refused to go along with General Mola's request that Spanish right-wing parliamentarians convene at Burgos on 17 July to denounce the government as unlawful.
- Richard A. H. Robinson however, rejects any claim that Gil-Robles was anything but a consummate politician struggling to keep the unstable right under control and within the law. The CEDA was not a mere front for fascist aspirations but a party that was based on Catholic values, including a desire to pursue social Catholicism. Gil Robles himself certainly expressed pro-republican views; in an interview with the American journalist Mallory Browne he said, "I am the only friend of the Republic" and was recorded as declaring that "a new dictatorship would produce, after a period of tranquillity, social revolution." Manuel Tardio and Ramon Arango argues that Gil Robles, despite possessing some authoritarian tendencies, did not advocate a dictatorship and neither he nor CEDA stepped beyond the limits of the constitution. Burnett Bolloten observes that Robles refused to seize power with the help of the military and monarchists after becoming war minister in May 1935, something for which they would never forgive him. After the Spanish Right's victory in the November 1933 elections, he maintained support for non-violence and wanted to use evolutionary rather than dictatorial means for achieving his vision of a corporative Spain, despite criticism from monarchists and his own party's youth section.

== Bibliography ==
- Álvarez Tardío, Manuel (2011). "Politics, Violence and Electoral Democracy in Spain: the case of the CEDA, 1933-1934" (PDF). Bulletin for Spanish and Portuguese Historical Studies. 35 (1).
- Arango, E. Ramón (2022). The Spanish political system: Franco's legacy. Routledge. ISBN 9780367311681. OCLC 1294283703.
- Beevor, Antony (2006). The Battle for Spain: The Spanish Civil War 1936–1939. Penguin Group. ISBN 978-0-14-303765-1.
- Bolloten, Burnett (1991). The Spanish civil war: Revolution and counterrevolution. Univ of North Carolina Press. ISBN 9780807819067. JSTOR 10.5149/9781469624471_bolloten.
- Gil-Robles, José María (1968). No fue posible la paz [Peace was not possible] (in Spanish). Barcelona: Ariel. OCLC 2801515.
- Preston, Paul (1975). "Spain's October Revolution and the Rightist Grasp for Power". Journal of Contemporary History. 10 (4): 555–578. ISSN 0022-0094. JSTOR 260101. OCLC 9970835075.
- Preston, Paul (1994). The Coming of the Spanish Civil War (2 ed.). London: Routledge. ISBN 9780203392898.
- Preston, Paul (2013). The Spanish Holocaust. Inquisition and Extermination in Twentieth-century Spain. London: HarperPress. ISBN 9780006386957.
- Rodríguez López-Brea, Carlos M. (2022). "El catolicismo político: una nueva presencia en la política española (1922-1936)" [Political Catholicism: a new presence in Spanish politics]. Historia Contemporánea (in Spanish) (69). UPV/EHU. doi:10.1387/hc.23078. hdl:10810/57630. ISSN 1130-2402.
- Seidman, Michael (2020). "Review of José María Gil-Robles: leader of the Catholic Right during the Spanish Second Republic by Manuel Álvarez Tardío". Mediterranean Historical Review. 35 (2). Taylor & Francis: 221–225. doi:10.1080/09518967.2020.1823663. ISSN 1743-940X.
- Vincent, Mary (1996). Catholicism in the Second Spanish Republic: religion and politics in Salamanca, 1930-1936. London: Clarendon Press. ISBN 9780198206132. OCLC 33817666.
- "José María Gil Robles". Encyclopedia Britannica. 23 Nov 2025.
