= Enrique Gil Robles =

Spanish law scholar and Carlist theorist (1849–1908)

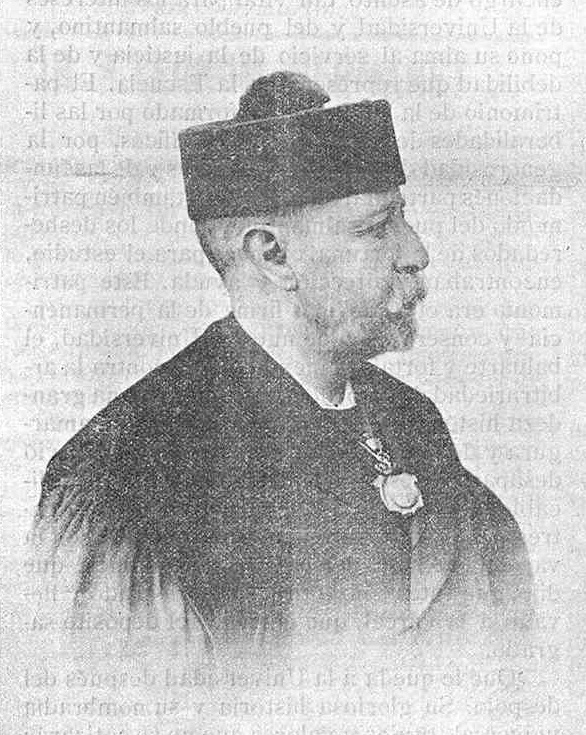
- Born: Enrique Gil Robles; 1849; Salamanca, Spain
- Died: 1908 (aged 58–59); Salamanca, Spain
- Occupations: Academic, politician
- Political party: Carlist, Integrist

Enrique Gil Robles (1849–1908) was a Spanish law scholar and a Carlist theorist. In popular public discourse he is known mostly as father of José María Gil-Robles y Quiñones. In scholarly debate he is recognized principally as one of key ideologues of Traditionalism; some authors view him also as major representative of a theory of law known as Iusnaturalismo.

== Family and youth ==
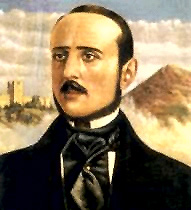
Enrique Gil y Carrasco

Enrique's paternal ancestors were a family of modest hidalgos from Leon. His grandfather, Juan Gil, settled in the town of Villafranca del Bierzo, serving as administrator of real estates belonging to Marqués de Villafranca and those owned by the local Catholic Church. Though a conservative, during Trienio Liberal (1821–1823) Gil was particularly active enlarging Villafranca's holdings by massive purchases of former Church property, put on sale during the first wave of desamortización. Following the death of marqués, audit of his possessions performed by state officials revealed that there were 20,114 reales missing. Though there were many doubts lingering, Gil left in disgrace and settled in Ponferrada.

Juan's oldest son, Enrique Gil y Carrasco, served in the cristino army during the First Carlist War and later became one of the best known Spanish authors of Romanticism. Before moving on diplomatic mission to Prussia he worked as local tax collector; since the job was inheritable, it was taken over by Juan's younger son and the future father of Enrique, Eugenio Gil y Carrasco (1819–?). Eugenio also demonstrated some knack for letters; following premature death of his brother he edited his works and published some himself. They were intended to preserve the memory of his late sibling, though Eugenio published also poems, few dedicated to his son. He married María Robles Burruezo, a native of Málaga. The couple settled in Salamanca, where Eugenio continued as "administrador de rentas reales".

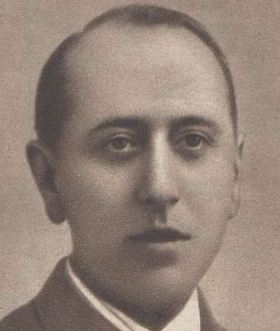
José María Gil-Robles y Quiñones

There is very little information available on the childhood years of the young Enrique, except that he was very early orphaned by his mother. He obtained bachillerato in Filosofía y Letras in Instituto de Segunda Enseñanza of Salamanca in 1864, studied law at the Salamanca University but graduated in derecho civil y canónico in Universidad Central in 1868. Upon the 1870 foundation of Instituto de Segunda Enseñanza in Ponferrada he was employed as "profesor interino" and commenced teaching historia universal, historia de España and retórica y poética, in the early 1870s assuming also the chair of psicología, lógica y ética. Simultaneously he was pursuing doctoral research in Madrid; he defended the PhD thesis in 1872. Already a doctor, in 1875 he became full titular professor of the Ponferrada Instituto.

As a 45-year-old Enrique Gil Robles married Petra Quiñones Armesto, originating from Ponferrada. The couple had 3 children, born between 1894 and 1898; the oldest son died few days after birth. The second and the youngest son, José María, as leader of CEDA became one of the best known politicians of the Second Spanish Republic; acknowledging nationwide renown of his father, he adopted the name of José María Gil-Robles y Quiñones. His son and Enrique's grandson, José María Gil-Robles y Gil-Delgado, following the Spanish transition to democracy became one of the country leading politicians; active in Alianza Popular and Partido Popular, in 1997-1999 he was president of the European Parliament.

== Academic ==
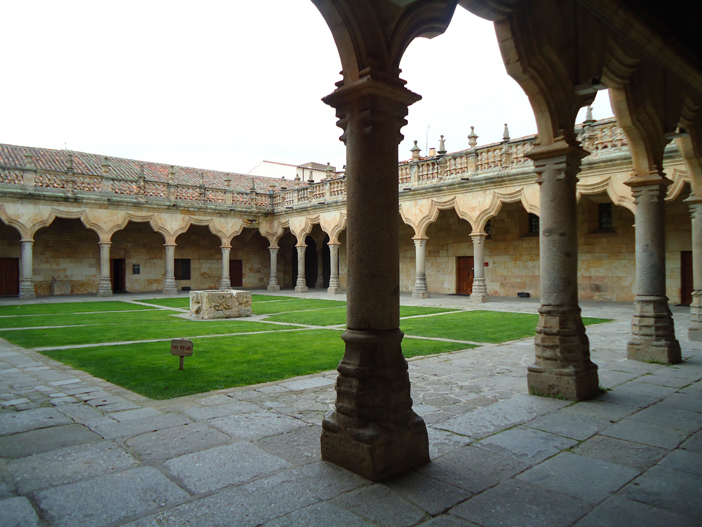
Escuelas Menores patio, Salamanca

In 1874 Gil apparently intended to take part in contest for chairs of elementos de derecho publico y administrativo español, to be held by universities in Oviedo, Valencia and Granada. Though admitted, for reasons which are not clear he did not attend the hearings. In July 1875 he did, however, participate in the contest for chairing cátedra de derecho político y administrativo in his native University of Salamanca, and emerged successful, in 1876 nominated catedrático numerario. He will occupy this post for the next 32 years, failing to show up at university premises only 4 days before death. The only difference in his assignment was that at some point the cátedra was split in two, and Gil continued as chair of derecho político.

A number of times Gil attempted to move away from Salamanca. In 1881 he was unsuccessful when applying for the same chair in Barcelona. The appeal was turned down by the ministry, but his victorious contender resigned and Gil was appointed in due course. However, shortly afterwards Gil resigned as well, quoting "unforeseen circumstances", and resumed his Salamanca duties. In 1882-1883 he fielded his candidature for derecho publico at Universidad Central in Madrid; the attempt was unsuccessful following some repeated changes of the admission procedure, which might be interpreted as aimed against Gil. In 1883-1886 he applied to enter the contest for cátedra de historia del derecho at Central, but was not admitted on legal grounds; similarly, he was rejected in 1885 for literatura jurídica and in 1886 for derecho canónico, always at Central. In 1891 he resumed his attempt for historia in Madrid, again to no avail. In 1901 Gil presented his bid for chair of Estudios Superiores de Derecho penal y de Antropología criminal, again in the capital, and was again unsuccessful.

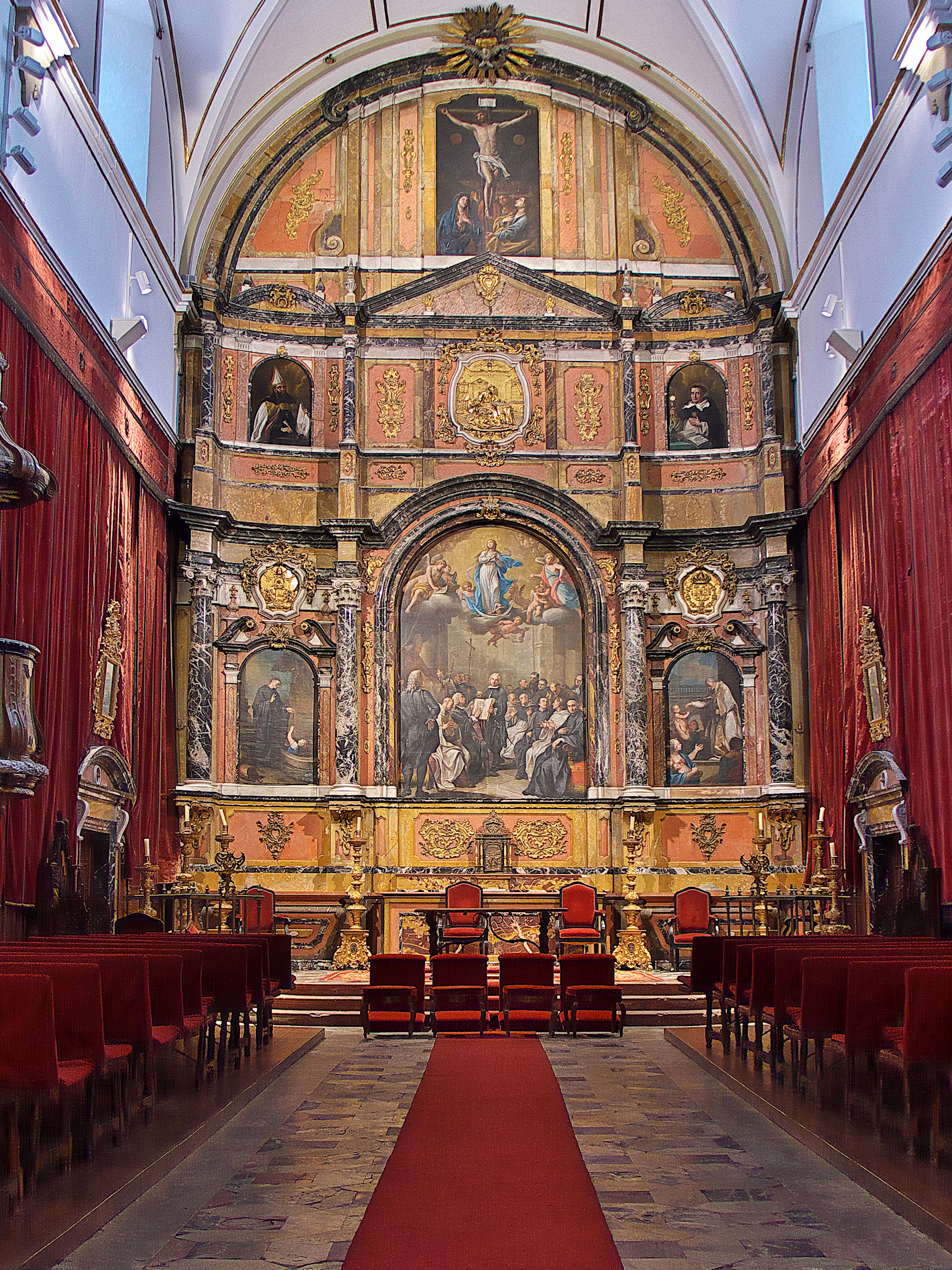
university chapel

Gil was building his academic position over time. In the early 1880s he had to suffer aggression from liberal circles both in the city and at the Salamanca university; as late as in the mid-1880s he was referred to as "almost unknown" in the world of Spanish law scholars. Gradually gaining recognition, throughout his career Gil was a number of times acting as judge in numerous contests for academic chairs across Spain and took part in national juridical congresses. He was also popular among students, who appreciated his clear style combined with courtesy and benevolence. Temporarily rising to dean of the law faculty, in the early 1890s Gil, along Mariano Arés Sanz, was already among the most prestigious Salamanca scholars; indeed by the end of the decade together with other neo-Thomists he dominated the Salamanca intellectual realm and was largely responsible for conservative reputation of the university. At the turn of the centuries it was rather the newcomers with pro-socialist leaning, like Miguel de Unamuno, who had to struggle against overwhelmingly conservative ambience. Largely aided by arrival of Pedro Dorado Montero, they gained ground in the 1900s, though Gil Robles until his death remained an iconic Salamanca figure.

== Works ==
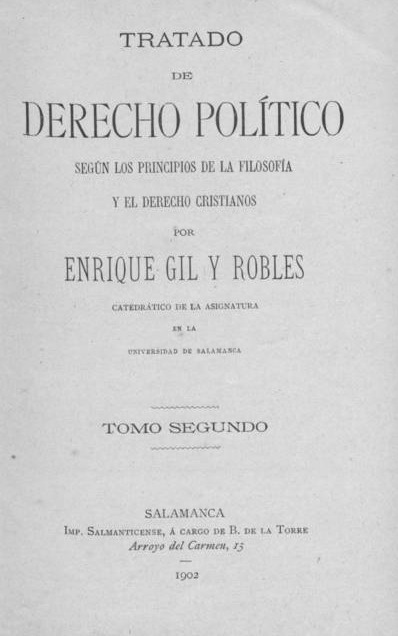
Tratado de derecho

Enrique Gil Robles was not a prolific writer; his written heritage is one major work, few booklets, a couple of articles in specialized reviews and a handful of manuscripts. He is known to have contributed to a number of periodicals, but exact scope of this activity is unclear; none of the scholarly studies consulted refers to him as "periodista". His works fall into 3 categories: theory of state, theory of law and pedagogy. Though he started writing in the early 1870s, his best known works were written and published between 1891 and 1902.

Gil's magnum opus was Tratado de derecho político según los principios de la filosofía y el derecho cristianos (Treaty on political law according to the principles of Christian law and philosophy), published in Salamanca in two volumes respectively in 1899 and 1902. Spanning across over 1,100 pages, the work was intended to provide exhaustive lecture on organization of state in general and principles of public law in particular, though it grew into synthesis of author's view on politics, history and religion. Two other publications, incomparable in size but far more often quoted, are two booklets: El absolutismo y la democracia (1891, containing his address opening the academic year in University of Salamanca) and Oligarquía y caciquismo. Naturaleza. Primeras causas. Remedios. Urgencia de ellos (1901). Both were formatted as lectures on problems of current Spanish politics, enveloped in wider ideological and philosophical discourse. Much less known is his early work on theory of a lawful state, ¿Qué condiciones debe reunir la Jurisprudencia para disfrutar de la autoridad de doctrina legal? (1888).

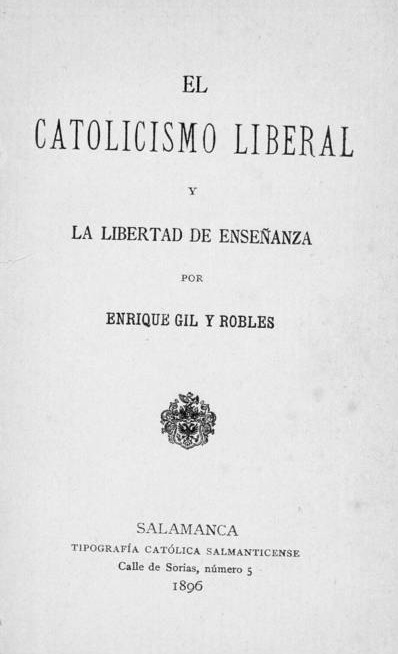
El catolicismo liberal

Among a number of works related to education the first to be named is El catolicismo liberal y la libertad de enseñanza (1896), a book comparing Catholic and liberal educational models; it developed theses laid out earlier in La Libertad Universitaria (1882). Less partisan and more technical studies were Ensayo de metodología jurídica (1893), Guía para el estudio del Derecho administrativo (1899), Advertencia preliminar a las "Recitaciones de Derecho Canónico y disciplina Eclesiástica de España" de Julián Portilla Martín (1900), Indicador y programa para la explicación en cátedra y la preparación fuera de ella de la asignatura de derecho político español comparado con el extranjero (1906), Método de enseñanza y programa de la asignatura de Elementos de Derecho político y administrativo español, Memoria acerca del método de enseñanza, plan, y programa de la asignatura de elementos de Derecho Político y Administrativo español and Razonamiento y programa de la asignatura de Historia general del Derecho español para las oposiciones de dicha Cátedra vacante en la Universidad Central (all in manuscript).

Gil's written heritage is complete with very few scholarly articles on politics, education and law, one translation from German (Friedrich Julius Stahl, Rechtsphilosophie) and an unspecified number of pieces contributed to local and national periodicals. None of his works was issued again until 1961, when Tratado de Derecho Político was re-edited by a Madrid publishing house. One present-day student refers to his opus as "very ample".

== Thought ==
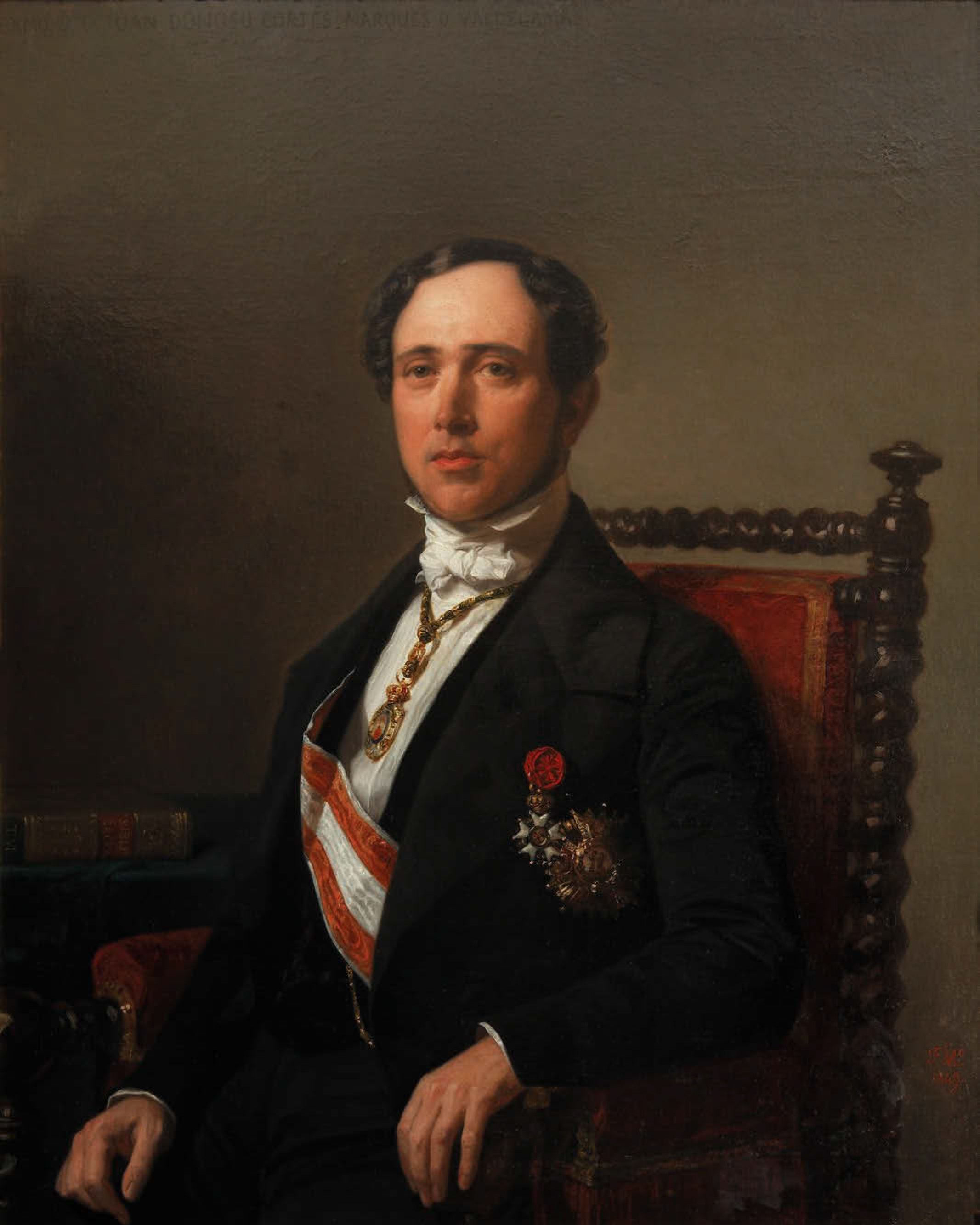
Donoso by Hernández Amores.

Some suggest that Gil's doctrine formed part of regenerationism and was largely a response to the 1898 disaster; most scholars claim that his thought continued earlier 19th Traditionalist works, especially those of Donoso Cortés, and developed mostly as reaction to the 1868 revolution. All students agree that Gil diagnosed the key malady of Spain as Liberalism, which destroyed traditional structures and replaced them with bourgeoisie oligarchy, exercised systematically by means of industry and trade and personally by the network of caciques. The prescription advocated was reversal to the spirit and partially institutions of Antiguo Régimen; two key elements of Gil's vision were organic society and sovereign king.

According to Gil men, who are not equally free and sovereign, form part of different groups. Though being individuals, they are expressed by activity in various social entities and in the overall structure. Society is not a sum of individuals, but a structure made of these groups; comparison to a living body consisting of vital organic wholes gave rise to the term "organic society", a pluralist and gradualist structure. All groups retain their internal autonomy; in Gil's nomenclature it was referred to as "autarquía" and stood for self-government. Society consists of 3 layers: noble class, middle class and working class, each with own roles and functions, though there are also other horizontal and vertical lines making various groups distinct. Democracy is not a political regime, but a constituting principle of such a society; it means recognition of roles performed by various groups and of their internal sovereignty, which at times might include the right to coerce. Society is held together by interdependence of its components and not by any social contract; contracts, by definition voluntary, temporary and reversible, would make such a commonality absurd.

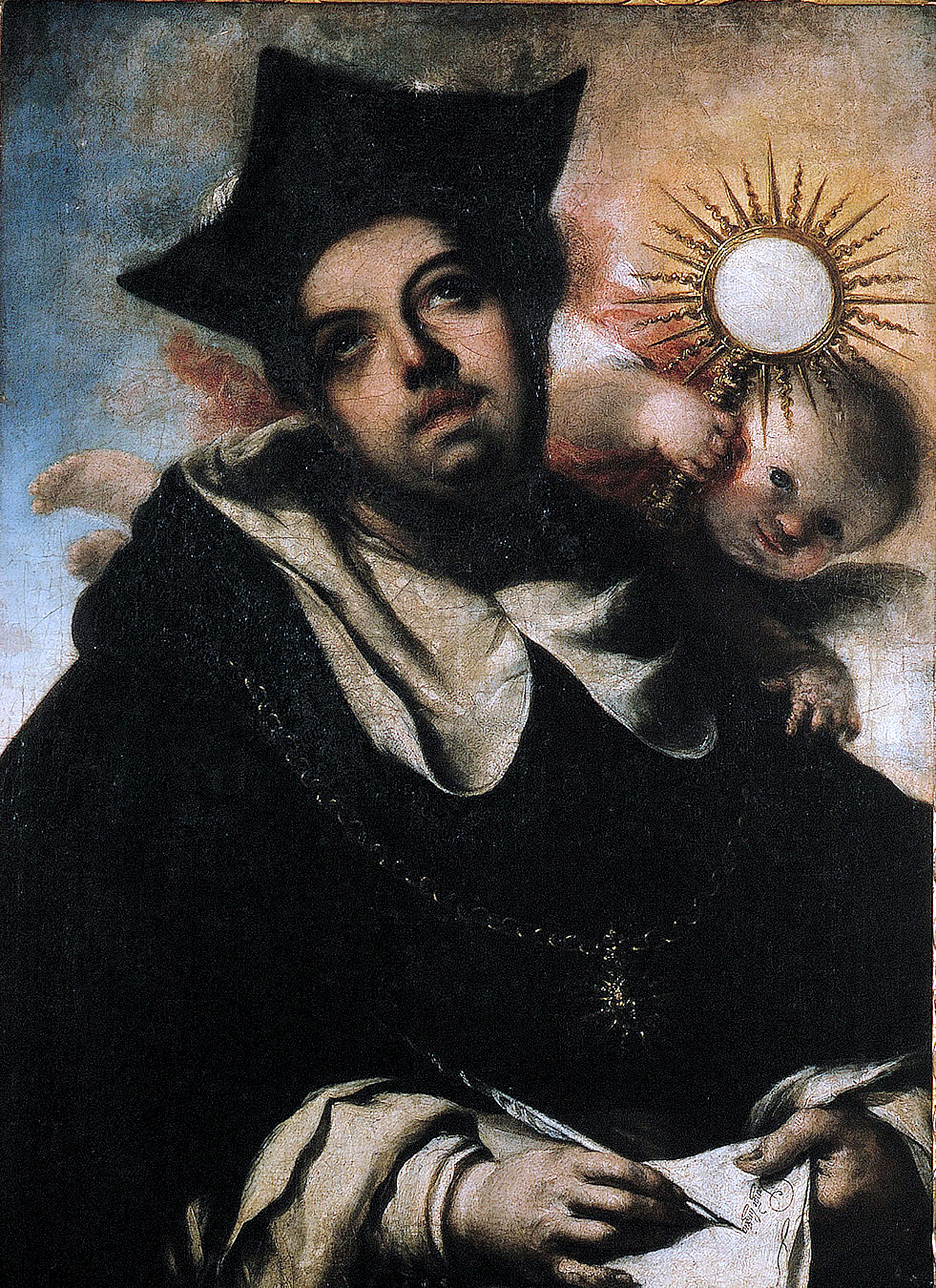
Aquinas by Herrera

Political representation is performed not by universal suffrage, which is anti-democratic as it unduly elevates individual self and gives rise to corruption and political oligarchy, but is to be channeled along corporative lines. The parliament – named "organicista" or "corporatista" - is to be entrusted with legislative initiative and consulting tasks. It should consist of two chambers. The lower one is to host territorial and labor entities, the upper one is to be made of selected and noble nominees.

The idea of state should be based on "monarquía bajomedieval", a withdrawn structure which performs only basic roles and cedes most governing to its social components. The rise of potent state – like most European countries of the late 19th century, Spain included - was due to decomposition of the society, unable to govern itself. In case of sane society, the state structure should be topped by a sovereign, a person (monarchy) rather than entity ("poliarquía"), limited in his powers by autarquía of social groupings, but enjoying political sovereignty – Gil rejected separation of powers into legislative, executive and juridical, though he distinguished between social and political sovereignty. He dismissed absolutist and constitutional monarchy alike. However, in extremis he was prepared to endorse coercion and admitted that dictatorial monarchy was acceptable as a last resort.

== Politician ==
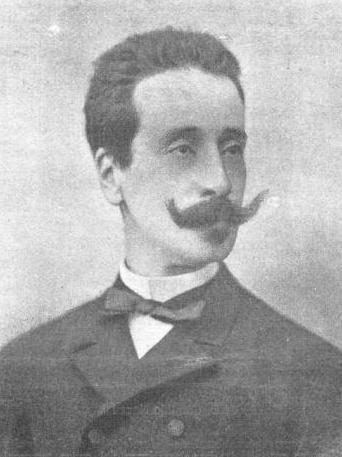
Ramón Nocedal, 1880s

None of the sources consulted clarifies how Gil adopted a conservative outlook. Having been eyewitness to excesses of the 1868 revolution in Madrid he might have been influenced by the neocatólicos, especially that he forged a close relationship with Ramón Nocedal. In 1869 co-founder of local Juventud Católica, starting 1870 he was delivering addresses with strong Traditionalist leaning and was quoted by Carlist newspapers. No source confirms (or denies) that he took part in the Third Carlist War, though some obituaries ambiguously claim that he "led the brave youth of Salamanca [...] fighting to defend Spain" of his ideal; it remains mysterious why he failed to attend 1874 hearings for academic posts he signed up to.

Gil remained active in Juventud also after 1876, and in late 1870s continued in its Salamanca executive. Engaged in broad Traditionalist movement, he prepared a massive 1882 pilgrimage to Rome and co-signed letters of support, addressed to ecclesiastical hierarchs and animated by the Nocedals. Gil participated also in clearly Carlist initiatives, like 1883 attempt to build a monument of Zumalacárregui, published in Carlist press and in the mid-1880s was already among leaders of the Salmantine Traditionalism. In 1886, he was rumored to run on the Carlist ticket for the Cortes, but the party eventually decided to maintain their abstention strategy.

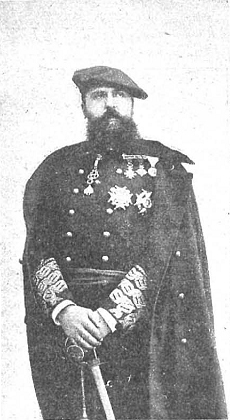
Carlos VII, 1898

During the 1888 crisis Gil decided to join the breakaway Nocedal-led Integrists, signing up to Manifesto de Burgos. In 1889 Gil was among organizers of their Partido Tradicionalista, but did not enter its executive. In 1891 he ran as Integrist for the Cortes in the Sequeros district; initially reported victorious, he was finally declared defeated and did not renew his bid in the following campaign of 1893. During run-up to the 1896 campaign he led the provincial junta electoral but did not run himself. At that time his relations with Nocedal were cooling down. Apart from other reasons, Gil was allegedly uncomfortable with virulent Integrist campaign against the Carlist claimant. In early 1899 Gil attempted to arrange reconciliation between mainstream Carlists and the Integrists, but was greeted with ice cold response of Nocedal. Later that year the two broke altogether, their public altercation cheered by the Republican press.

Having left Integrism Gil returned to "vieja mansión" of mainstream Carlism; following 1899 exchange of cordial letters with Carlos VII he started to publish in semi-official party daily El Correo Español, though he did not enter the party structures. For some time in 1901-1902 he kept working for reconciliation. In 1903 he renewed his Cortes bid, this time almost assured victory in the Carlist-dominated Pamplona. In the parliament he became the spokesman of the Carlist minority and until 1905 was fairly frequently reported by the press as active on a variety of issues, ranging from education to Catalan question, legal order, organization of trade, foreign policy, internal rules of the Congress and religion. He did not run in the 1905 and 1907 elections and remained rather loosely involved in internal Carlist politics, but kept publishing in Correo Español.

== Salmantino ==
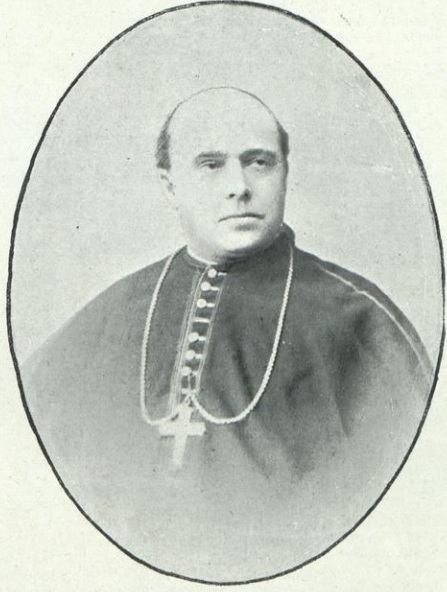
Tomás Cámara y Castro

Gil was active in many fields of the Salmantine realm. In 1883 he entered the local Comisión de Reformas Sociales; in 1887 he was admitted as member-correspondent to Academia de Legislación y Jurisprudencia de Salamanca; in 1893 he was voted into the city ayuntamiento, where he led the conservative faction; this council was dubbed "ayuntamiento de notables"; in 1894 he was vice-president of the Salamancan Liga de Productores; in 1902 he was nominated to Consejo Universitario in Salamanca and other provincial educational bodies and in 1903 he was proposed to represent the province in the Senate, delegated by the University. He contributed to Salmantine Traditionalist periodicals, first La Tesis, then La Región and finally La Información. However, Gil left his trademark on the Salmantine life by means of two long-lasting conflicts with other local personalities.

The intransigent Integrists clashed with the Spanish ecclesiastical hierarchy, which advocated the platform of Catholic unity, almost from the onset, which finally led to calling off the 1882 pilgrimage to Rome. Locally the conflict was aggravated with the 1885 arrival of the new Salamanca bishop, Tomás Cámara y Castro, a hierarch described as posibilista, moderado and aperturista. He launched onslaught on fundamentalist line of local Traditionalist periodicals, which soon led to an open press war; the most distinguished representative of Salmantine Integros, supported by the local Jesuits, was Gil, dubbed "prohombre" of "camarilla jesuítica antiepiscopal". The conflict climaxed in 1892, when Cámara banned local Catholics from reading La Región and all periodicals edited by Manuel Sánchez Asensio and Gil Robles. The latter fought back appealing to Rome, kept referring to the bishop with venomous irony and confronted him as late as in 1895. In the late 1890s the conflict scaled down as Gil moved away from Integrism and Cámara turned his ally in showdown against liberal University scholars.

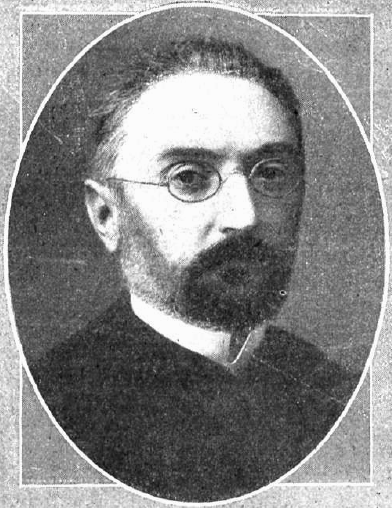
Miguel de Unamuno

After 1891 death of Mariano Arés Sanz the Salmantine academic realm was almost entirely dominated by conservatives like Gil Robles, Alejandro de la Torre Vélez and Nicasio Sánchez Mata. It was exactly the funeral of Arés which produced confrontation with Miguel de Unamuno, then a young professor of Greek freshly landed in Salamanca. Gil's address opening the 1891-2 course elicited another backlash, which took shape of 5 Unamuno's articles titled Un nocedalino desquiciado. Written in very aggressive language quite untypical for public disputes between academics of the era, they denounced Gil as a reactionary intending to galvanize the long dead Middle Ages; Unamuno lambasted his opponent as "inepto, mediocre y indocto" and his address as "sudado, artificioso, falso, manera y no estilo". Later on Unamuno backtracked, at least in terms of tone, but relations between the two remained tense. Unamuno soon found an ally in another newcomer academic, Pedro Dorado Montero, in 1897 endangered not only by expulsion from the university, but also by excommunication; the two kept reclaiming the local academic realm from the conservatives, the task largely completed after the death of Gil Robles.

== Reception and legacy ==
By the end of his life Gil emerged as key Traditionalist thinker and gained a prestigious scholarly position; however, he did not make it to the top elite of Spanish law academics, as certified by his failures to obtain a chair in Madrid. Following death his memory was first eclipsed and later relegated into oblivion by prolific activity of another Carlist theorist, Juan Vázquez de Mella. In the 1930s his image was reduced further on to merely "a father of José María Gil-Robles". After the war neither the regime nor any other political grouping admitted deference to Gil. During revival of the Carlist doctrine in the late Francoist era its key theorists focused on de Mella and referred to Gil casually, though he was acknowledged as one of the giants of Traditionalism. Following transición Traditionalism went dramatically out of fashion and a present-day student refers to Gil as "unknown figure, unjustly forgotten".

In the current scholarly discourse as a law theorist Gil is classified as 'iusnaturalista" belonging either to the neo-scholastic or neo-thomist school, indebted to Luigi Taparelli, José Prisco and Luis Mendizabal Martín. In dedicated works on natural law in Spain he is treated either marginally or not at all, though some authors appreciate his original contribution. As a theorist of education he is presented as representative of Catholic fundamentalism, enemy of krausism and heterodoxy. As a state theorist he is usually referred to as Traditionalist, sometimes also as "organicista", "católico tradicional" or representative of "corporativismo católico". As a politician Gil is typically labeled either as Carlist or Integrist. As a public figure he is considered a reactionary. According to his son he was "a democrat to the core"; José María Gil-Robles admitted having been politically indebted to his father, but their visions of Christian democracy were entirely incompatible.

Carlist standard

Scholars differ when assessing Gil's contribution to Traditionalism. In a very recent historiographical synthesis of the theory he is treated marginally; some see him as merely a "sistematizador" of earlier thought; others view him as a theorist who re-modeled the ideology and one of the all-time Traditionalist greats. One student names Gil "most systematic doctrinaire of Traditionalism of the early 20th century" and considers de Mella his follower. In the Spanish public discourse Gil remains largely unknown and hence, unlike some other Traditionalist thinkers, does not generate controversy. In the international realm popular works of mostly foreign historians portrayed him as sort of proto-fascist. Also specialized Spanish scholars, when discussing his general contribution to right-wing thought, despite Gil's vehement hostility towards omnipotent state admit that "generic organicist ideas that emerged in a general movement of reflux of individualism, put in front of the social question, eventually facilitated the arrival in the twenties to authoritarian or totalitarian corporatist solutions."

== See also ==
- Carlism
- José María Gil-Robles y Quiñones
- Natural law
- University of Salamanca
