= Álvaro Gil-Robles =

Spanish jurist and human rights activist

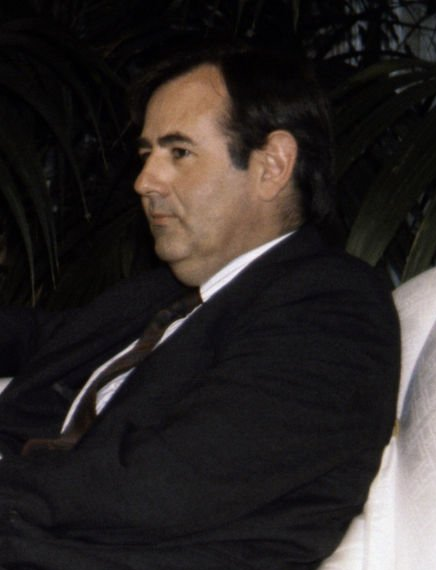
- Álvaro Gil Robles at a reception made to welcome him by Felipe González

Ombudsman of Spain
- In office 1988–1993

Personal details
- Born: September 9, 1944 (age 80); Lisbon, Portugal

Álvaro Gil-Robles y Gil-Delgado (born 9 September 1944 in Lisbon, Portugal) is a Spanish jurist and human rights activist. He was the 2nd Spanish Ombudsman between 1988 and 1993 and also served as Acting Ombudsman between December 1987 and March 1988.

== Biography ==
Álvaro Gil-Robles was born in the family of prominent Spanish conservative leader José María Gil-Robles y Quiñones (1898-1980), which was the professor of constitutional law and founder and leader of the CEDA (Spanish Confederation of autonomous rights). His father played a significant role during the final years of the second Republic (1931-1936). He went into exile in Portugal after the Spanish Civil War (1936-1939). His brother was José María Gil-Robles, President of the European Parliament between 1997 and 1999.

Álvaro Gil-Robles could come to Spain at the beginning of the 1950s, where he got a great humanistic education at the Universidad Complutense de Madrid (1966) and after that, in seven years, obtained his doctorate at the University with a thesis on the legal role of the defender of the people (1973).

He is a political figure who then did not exist in the organizational chart of the Spanish public administration, but took part in many public activities: he was a Member of the Spanish Association for human rights, President of the Spanish Commission of help to refugees (CEAR), and Vice-President of the CEAR Foundation, whose Honorary President is the queen Doña Sofia. Between 1995 and 1999 he chaired the Forum for the Social integration of immigrants, an advisory body of the Ministry of Social Affairs.

He started his teaching career in the university in 1967, but from 1978 he taught administrative law. Than he became Professor of the Instituto de Derechos Humanos de la Universidad Complutense and left alma mater in 1980 to join the newly created Constitutional Court as an attorney.

He was the author of Ombudsman Law of Spain and became a deputy of the Spanish Ombudsman in 1983. In 1988 he was elected as the ombudsman of Spain.

He was Commissioner for Human Rights of Council of Europe from 15 October 1999 to 31 March 2006. He was the first person to occupy this newly created position, and was succeeded by Thomas Hammarberg.

From 2000 to 2005 he visited public organizations in various countries (ee the list below) and showed violations of human rights in his reports to the corresponding governments for their future improvement.

== Chronology of visits ==
- 2000: Georgia and Moldova
- 2001: Andorra, Norway, Slovakia, Finland and Bulgaria
- 2002: Greece, Hungary, Romania and Poland
- 2003: Czech Republic, Slovenia, Portugal, Turkey, Cyprus, Lithuania, Latvia, Estonia and Malta
- 2004: Luxembourg, Denmark, Sweden, Croatia, Russia, Switzerland and Liechtenstein
- 2005: Spain, Italy, Iceland, France and Kosovo

His extensive reports may be found at the homepage of Commissioner for Human Rights.
