= Julio Carabias Salcedo =

Spanish banker

- Portrait by Julio Moisés (1888-1968)

Governor of the Bank of Spain
- In office April 1931 – September 1933
- Preceded by: Federico Carlos Bas Vassallo
- Succeeded by: Manuel Marraco Ramón

Personal details
- Born: 17 September 1885 Valladolid, Spain
- Died: 11 May 1963 (aged 77)
- Occupation: Professor

Julio Carabias Salcedo (17 September 1885 – 11 May 1963) was a Spanish banker who was the first governor of the Bank of Spain during the Second Spanish Republic.

== Early years (1885–1931) ==
Julio Carabias Salcedo was born on 17 September 1885 in Valladolid, Spain. His parents were Casimiro Carabias and Carolina Salcedo. He attended the Educated Escuela Superior de Comercio and the Escuela de Altos Estudios Mercantiles in Bilbao. He married Amalia Calonge. Their children were Amalia, Julio, Ramón and Rafael. Carabias became an expert in banking economics, working in the private sector. He was appointed managing director of the Banco Vasco (1918–20), and then manager of the Banco Español del Rio de la Plata (1920–31).

== Second Spanish Republic (1931–36) ==
At the start of the Second Spanish Republic in April 1931, Carabias was appointed governor of the Bank of Spain in place of Federico Carlos Bas Vassallo. The appointment was made by decree of 17 April 1931. He was appointed by Indalecio Prieto, who trusted him completely. One of Prieto's main objectives was to sustain the foreign exchange rate. Carabias proposed to improve efficiency by merging the two bodies charged with intervening in the international currency market, the Exchange Operations Regulatory Centre (Centro Regulador de Operaciones de Cambio) and the Official Currency Trading Centre (Centro Oficial de Contratación de Moneda).

Carabias prepared to open negotiations with foreign banks to obtain credits that would finance a stronger peseta and would avoid speculations that threatened to destabilize the currency, which he viewed as an extreme danger. The foreign banks objected to granting loans to the Bank of Spain or the Government of Spain, arguing that this would be counterproductive unless there was a monetary stabilization plan and the bank was prepared to take measures such as raising the discount rate, transfer of gold abroad to buy pesetas and reduction of banknotes in circulation. The board of the bank opposed the export of gold, arguing that this would be futile unless the budgetary policy was changed since this was the root cause of the decline in the peseta.

Since budgetary tightening would cause economic pain, Carabias frequently found himself in conflict with politicians during the summer of 1931. As the peseta's value dropped, the Official Currency Trading Center intervened with all its means to shore up the currency, exhausted all its metallic reserves and consumed a short-term loan of 500,000 pounds sterling. Carabias pointed out that allowing unlimited inflation would have the effect of ruining the rich, so the bank's advisers were in favour of stabilizing the peseta. If this could be done, the bank would profit, and Carabias felt this profit should be shared with the state. In June 1931, the Bank of France granted a credit of 6 million pounds in exchange for a guarantee of 5 million gold pounds deposited in London and another 6 million pounds that the Bank of Spain sent to Mont-de-Marsan.

Relations between the Bank of Spain and the government eased when the gold standard was suspended in Great Britain on 21 September 1931, and the Spanish monetary authorities abandoned the policy of maintaining the peseta at all costs. The peseta rose in value against the pound, although it continued to fall against other currencies. After Prieto left office, Carabias served under Jaime Carner from 16 December 1931 and then Agustín Viñuales from 12 June 1933. In an interview in 1933, Carabias said that the situation of the Spanish currency in the international market was satisfactory. He praised the results achieved by the Official Currency Trading Center in 1931 and 1932. Carabias left office in September 1933, replaced by Manuel Marraco Ramón.

In 1936, Carabias was appointed president of the Consejo Superior Bancario. Carabias was a deputy governor of the Bank of Spain during the Spanish Civil War. On 14 September 1936, he and the Director General of the Treasury, Francisco Méndez Aspe, supervised the transfer of about 560 tons of gold to the Cartagena naval base. From there, on 25 October 1936, four Soviet merchant ships left with the gold for Odessa from where it was taken to Moscow. From August to December 1938, Carabias, the First Deputy Governor of the Bank of Spain, was acting as the governor of the bank in the Republican zone. He was awarded the Grand Cross of the Order of the Spanish Republic.

== Later career (1939–1963) ==
After the Spanish Civil War, Carabias was exiled. In November 1939, he travelled from New York to Mexico City, entering Mexico through Nuevo Laredo on 23 November 1939. His occupation was given as a professor. In March 1940, the Hispano-Mexican Cabinet of Industrial Studies (HISME: Cabinete Hispano-Mexicano de Estudios Industriales) was established to study the industrial investment plans submitted by the Ministry of Economy. Carabias became a member of this group of Spanish experts, which also included engineers, financiers and jurists. He was an adviser to Financiera Hispano-Mexicana, Mexico City, in 1942. In 1944, he was an assistant at the Superintendencia de Bancos, Santiago, Chile. He died in Santiago de Chile on May 11, 1963, where he is buried.

== Sources ==
- Cabezas, Octavio (2005), Indalecio Prieto, socialista y español (in Spanish), EDAF, ISBN 978-84-96107-45-8
- Carabias Salcedo, Julio's card file, Ministry of Education, Culture and Sport (Mexico)
- Garcia-Delgado, Jose Luis; Serrano-Sanz, Jose Maria (2000), "Del ral a l'euro: una història de la pesseta", la Caixa (in Basque), ISBN 978-84-88099-62-4
- Gobernadores del Banco de España (in Spanish), BDE: Banco de España, 20 May 2010
- Gómez Pastor, Paloma, "Julio Carabias Salcedo", Diccionario Biográfico Español (in Spanish), Real Academia de la Historia de España
- Manjón-Cabeza, Octavio Ruiz (1986), Historia general de España y América (in Spanish), Ediciones Rialp, ISBN 978-84-321-2115-9
- Mariné, Enrique (1933), "El Momento de España", ABC (in Spanish)
- Prieto, Indalecio (17 April 1931), Gaceta de Madrid (PDF) (in Spanish)
- Velarde Fuertes, Juan (1983), Indalecio Prieto, en Hacienda (PDF) (in Spanish), USAL: Universidad de Salamanca
