= Governor of the Bank of Spain =

- Gobernador del Banco de España

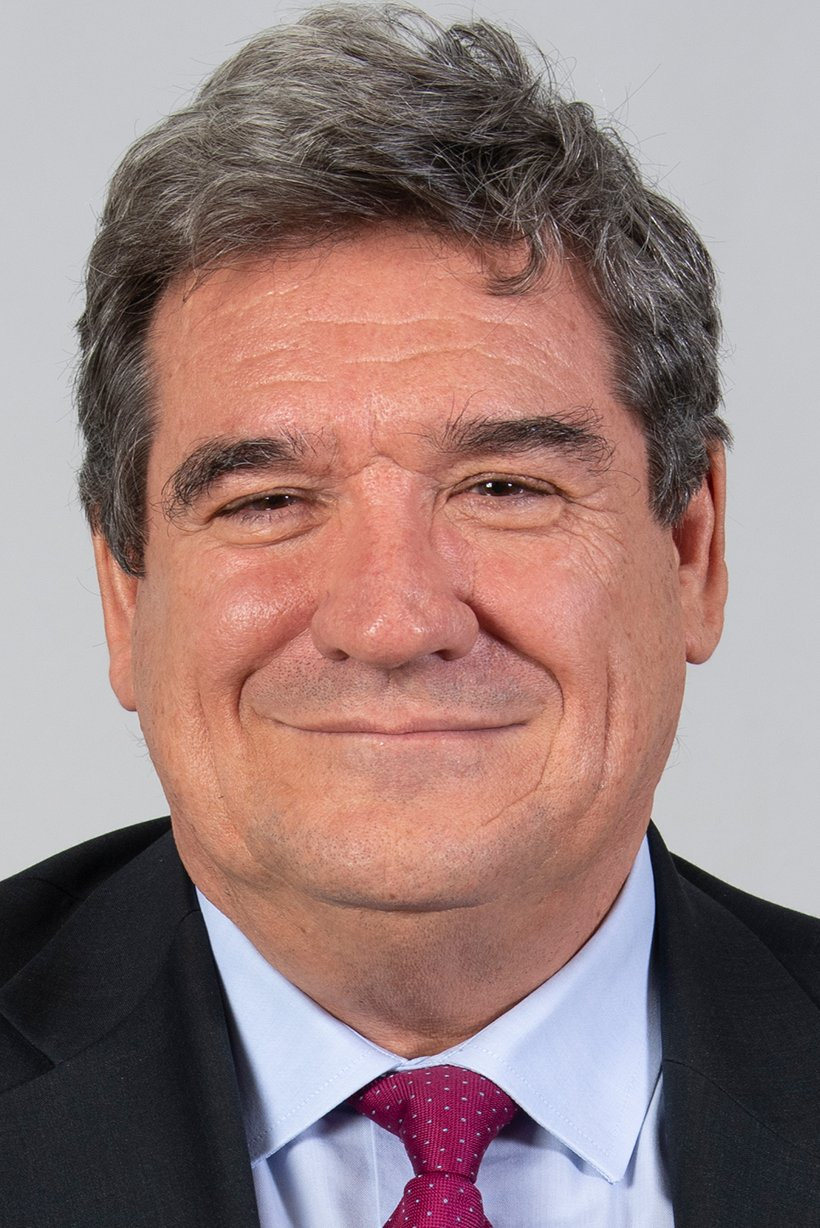
- Incumbent; José Luis Escrivá since 6 September 2024
- Bank of Spain
- Member of: Governing Council of the European Central Bank
- Reports to: Government of Spain; Cortes Generales
- Nominator: Prime Minister after informing Congress
- Appointer: Monarch countersigned by the Prime Minister
- Term length: 6 years, not renewable
- Constituting instrument: Bank of Spain Act of 1856
- Precursor: Governor of the Bank of San Fernando
- Formation: January 28, 1856; 170 years ago
- First holder: Ramón de Santillán
- Deputy: Deputy Governor of the Bank of Spain
- Website: www.bde.es

The governor of the Bank of Spain (Spanish: Gobernador del Banco de España) is the head of the Bank of Spain, the central bank of the Kingdom of Spain. The Bank of Spain is integrated in the European System of Central Banks and, as such, the Governor is an ex officio member of the Governing Council of the European Central Bank.

The Governor is appointed by the executive branch and it reports to both Government and Parliament. To ensure its independence, the governor has a term of six years, with no possibility of renewal. Further, the governor cannot be fired except for exceptional cases.

The current governor of the Bank of Spain is economist José Luis Escrivá.

== Appointment process ==
As stipulated by the Bank of Spain Autonomy Act of 1994, the Monarch appoints the Governor, the Deputy Governor and the rest of members of the Bank's Governing Council and Executive Committee. The governor is nominated by the Prime Minister, while the deputy governor is nominated by the incumbent governor.

The governor has a special appointment process. Before the appointment, the Minister of Economy must appear before the Congress of Deputies' Economy Committee to inform them about the candidate. The candidate does not need the approval of Congress, although as a requirement, the candidate is required to be a Spanish person with recognized competence in monetary or banking matters.

The governor's and deputy governor's term’s lasts six years and is not renewable. The governor and deputy governor only leave the office when the term ends, by resignation or when the Government proves that the governor has a permanent incapacity for the exercise of their powers, serious breach of their obligations, office incompatibility or prosecution for a criminal offense.

== Functions ==
The governor's functions are:

- To direct the Bank and preside over the Governing Council and the Executive Committee.
- To legally represent the Bank for all purposes and, especially, before courts of justice, as well as authorize contracts and documents and perform the other activities that are necessary for performance of the functions entrusted to the Bank of Spain.
- To represent the Bank of Spain in institutions and international organizations in which it is expected to participate.
- To hold the status of member of the Governing Council and of the General Council of the European Central Bank.

== List of governors ==
This is a list of the people that have served as Governor of the Bank of Spain. This title was adopted in 1856, although the Bank's roots dates back to 1782.

#	Name	Appointment	Termination	Ref.	Designated by
1	Ramón de Santillán González (1791-1861)	April 24, 1856	October 19, 1863		Juan Bravo Murillo (Minister of Finance)
2	Francisco Santa Cruz Pacheco (1797-1883)	October 30, 1863	March 31, 1866		Victorio Fernández Lascoiti Fourquet (Minister of Finance)
3	Victorio Fernández Lascoiti Fourquet (1810-1878)	April 20, 1866	July 25, 1866		Manuel Alonso Martínez (Minister of Finance)
4	Juan Bautista Trúpita Jiménez Cisneros (1815-1873)	July 25, 1866	October 24, 1868		José García Barzanallana (Minister of Finance)
5	Manuel Cantero San Vicente (1804-1876)	October 24, 1868	December 6, 1876		Laureano Figuerola (Minister of Finance)
6	Pedro Salaverría y Charitu (1821-1896)	January 14, 1877	October 20, 1877		José García Barzanallana (Minister of Finance)
7	José Elduayen Gorriti (1823-1898)	October 20, 1877	February 12, 1878		Manuel Orovio Echagüe (Minister of Finance)
8	Martín Belda y Mencía del Barrio (1820-1882)	February 17, 1878	March 1, 1881		Manuel Orovio Echagüe (Minister of Finance)
9	Antonio Romero Ortiz (1822-1884)	March 1, 1881	October 27, 1883		Juan Francisco Camacho de Alcorta (Minister of Finance)
10	Juan Francisco Camacho de Alcorta (1813-1896)	October 27, 1883	January 22, 1884		José Gallostra y Frau (Minister of Finance)
11	Francisco de Cárdenas Espejo (1817-1898)	January 24, 1884	January 31, 1885		Fernando Cos-Gayón (Minister of Finance)
12	Salvador Albacete y Albert (1827-1890)	February 10, 1885	August 4, 1890		Fernando Cos-Gayón (Minister of Finance)
13	Cayetano Sánchez Bustillo (1839-1908)	August 14, 1890	November 25, 1891		Fernando Cos-Gayón (Minister of Finance)
14	Juan Francisco Camacho de Alcorta (1813-1896)	November 25, 1891	April 6, 1892		Juan de la Concha Castañeda (Minister of Finance)
15	Santos de Isasa y Valseca (1822-1907)	April 8, 1892	December 28, 1892		Juan de la Concha Castañeda (Minister of Finance)
16	Pío Gullón Iglesias (1835-1917)	December 28, 1892	April 4, 1895		Germán Gamazo (Minister of Finance)
17	Santos de Isasa y Valseca (1822-1907)	April 4, 1895	September 10, 1895		Juan Navarro Reverter (Minister of Finance)
18	Manuel Aguirre de Tejada (1827-1911)	September 15, 1895	December 14, 1895		Juan Navarro Reverter (Minister of Finance)
19	José García Barzanallana (1819-1903)	December 17, 1895	October 19, 1897		Juan Navarro Reverter (Minister of Finance)
20	Manuel de Eguilior y Llaguno (1842-1931)	October 21, 1897	March 6, 1899		Joaquín López Puigcerver (Minister of Finance)
21	Luis María de la Torre y de la Hoz (1827-1901)	March 6, 1899	October 24, 1899		Joaquín López Puigcerver (Minister of Finance)
22	Antonio María Fabié Escudero (1832-1899)	October 26, 1899	December 3, 1899		Raimundo Fernández Villaverde (Minister of Finance)
23	Juan de la Concha Castañeda (1818-1903)	January 2, 1900	April 12, 1901		Raimundo Fernández Villaverde (Minister of Finance)
24	Pío Gullón e Iglesias (1835-1917)	April 12, 1901	February 18, 1902		Ángel Urzaiz (Minister of Finance)
25	Andrés Mellado Fernández (1846-1913)	July 25, 1902	December 9, 1902		Tirso Rodrigáñez y Sagasta (Minister of Finance)
26	Antonio García Alix (1852-1911)	December 9, 1902	July 20, 1903		Raimundo Fernández Villaverde (Minister of Finance)
27	José Sánchez Guerra y Martínez (1859-1935)	July 28, 1903	December 5, 1903		Augusto González Besada (Minister of Finance)
28	Tomás Castellano y Villarroya (1850-1906)	December 8, 1903	December 16, 1904		Guillermo de Osma y Scull (Minister of Finance)
29	Manuel Allendesalazar y Muñoz de Salazar (1856-1923)	December 20, 1904	August 17, 1905		Tomás Castellano y Villarroya (Minister of Finance)
30	Trinitario Ruiz y Capdepón (1836-1911)	August 17, 1905	June 25, 1906		José Echegaray (Minister of Finance)
31	Fernando Merino Villarino (1860-1929)	June 25, 1906	January 26, 1907		Amós Salvador Rodrigáñez (Minister of Finance)
32	José Sánchez Guerra y Martínez (1859-1935)	January 26, 1907	September 14, 1908		Guillermo de Osma y Scull (Minister of Finance)
33	Antonio García Alix (1852-1911)	September 14, 1908	October 30, 1909		Augusto González Besada (Minister of Finance)
34	Fernando Merino Villarino (1860-1929)	October 30, 1909	February 9, 1910		Juan Alvarado y del Saz (Minister of Finance)
35	Tirso Rodrigáñez y Sagasta (1853-1935)	February 12, 1910	April 3, 1911		Eduardo Cobián (Minister of Finance)
36	Eduardo Cobián y Rofiñac (1857-1918)	April 6, 1911	November 12, 1913		Tirso Rodrigáñez y Sagasta (Minister of Finance)
37	Lorenzo Domínguez Pascual (1863-1923)	November 12, 1913	January 13, 1916		Gabino Bugallal (Minister of Finance)
38	Manuel de Eguilior Llaguno (1842-1931)	January 13, 1916	July 19, 1916		Ángel Urzaiz (Minister of Finance)
39	Amós Salvador Rodrigáñez (1845-1922)	July 19, 1916	June 15, 1917		Santiago Alba Bonifaz (Minister of Finance)
40	Lorenzo Domínguez Pascual (1863-1926)	June 15, 1917	November 13, 1917		Gabino Bugallal (Minister of Finance)
41	Tirso Rodrigáñez y Sagasta (1853-1935)	November 13, 1917	April 23, 1919		Juan Ventosa (Minister of Finance)
42	Manuel Allendesalazar y Muñoz de Salazar (1856-1923)	April 23, 1919	October 17, 1919		Juan de la Cierva y Peñafiel (Minister of Finance)
43	Eduardo Sanz Escartín (1855-1939)	October 17, 1919	March 13, 1921		Gabino Bugallal (Minister of Finance)
44	José Maestre Pérez (1866-1933)	March 17, 1921	August 15, 1921		Manuel de Argüelles (Minister of Finance)
45	Luis Alfonso Sedó Guichard (1873-1952)	August 23, 1921	March 14, 1922		Francisco Cambó (Minister of Finance)
46	Salvador Bermúdez de Castro O'Lawlor (1863-1945)	March 14, 1922	January 2, 1923		Francisco Bergamín García (Minister of Finance)
47	Tirso Rodrigáñez y Sagasta (1853-1935)	January 2, 1923	September 17, 1923		José Manuel Pedregal (Minister of Finance)
48	Carlos Vergara Cailleaux (1854-1929)	February 25, 1924	October 16, 1929		Miguel Primo de Rivera
49	José Manuel Figueras Arizcun (1869-1944)	October 16, 1929	February 21, 1930		José Calvo Sotelo (Minister of Finance)
50	Juan Antonio Gamazo y Abarca (1883-1968)	February 21, 1930	August 31, 1930		Manuel de Argüelles (Minister of Finance)
51	Federico Carlos Bas Vassallo (1873-1938)	August 31, 1930	April 16, 1931		Julio Wais San Martín (Minister of Finance)
52	Julio Carabias Salcedo (1883-1963)	April 16, 1931	September 30, 1933		Indalecio Prieto (Minister of Finance)
53	Manuel Marraco Ramón (1870-1956)	September 30, 1933	March 3, 1934		Antonio Lara Zárate (Minister of Finance)
54	Alfredo de Zavala y Lafora (1893-1995)	March 7, 1934	April 3, 1935		Manuel Marraco Ramón (Minister of Finance)
55	Alejandro Fernández de Araoz y de la Devesa (1894-1970)	April 6, 1935	May 10, 1935		Alfredo de Zavala y Lafora (Minister of Finance)
56	Alfredo de Zavala y Lafora (1893-1995)	May 10, 1935	February 28, 1936		Joaquín Chapaprieta (Minister of Finance)
57	Luis Nicolau d'Olwer (1888-1961)	March 4, 1936	1938	?	Gabriel Franco (Minister of Finance)
When the Civil War broke out, the Bank of Spain remained operational in the Republican-controlled areas until late 1938. At that time, the governor, Julio Carabias, stepped down temporarily. In the areas controlled by the Nationalists, the Burgos branch lacked a governor until April 1938, when Antonio Goicoechea was appointed.
58	Antonio Goicoechea Cosculluela (1876-1953)	March 25, 1938	July 21, 1950		Andrés Amado (Minister of Finance)
59	Francisco de Cárdenas y de la Torre (1875-1967)	August 2, 1950	September 7, 1951		Joaquín Benjumea Burín (Minister of Finance)
60	Joaquín Benjumea Burín (1876-1963)	September 7, 1951	December 30, 1963		Francisco Gómez de Llano (Minister of Finance)
61	Mariano Navarro Rubio (1913-2001)	July 9, 1965	July 24, 1970		Juan José Espinosa San Martín (Minister of Finance)
62	Luis Coronel de Palma (1925-2000)	July 24, 1970	August 24, 1976		Alberto Monreal Luque (Minister of Finance)
63	José María López de Letona (1922-2018)	August 24, 1976	March 2, 1978		Eduardo Carriles Galarraga (Minister of Finance)
64	José Ramón Álvarez Rendueles (1940 - )	March 2, 1978	July 24, 1980		Fernando Abril Martorell
64	José Ramón Álvarez Rendueles (1940 - )	July 24, 1980	July 24, 1984		Adolfo Suárez
65	Mariano Rubio Jiménez (1931-1999)	July 24, 1984	July 24, 1988		Felipe González
65	Mariano Rubio Jiménez (1931-1999)	July 24, 1988	July 24, 1992		Felipe González
66	Luis Ángel Rojo Duque (1934-2011)	July 25, 1992	July 8, 1994		Felipe González
66	Luis Ángel Rojo Duque (1934-2011)	July 8, 1994	July 12, 2000		Felipe González
67	Jaime Caruana Lacorte (1952)	July 12, 2000	July 12, 2006		José María Aznar (President of the Government)
68	Miguel Ángel Fernández Ordóñez (1945- )	July 12, 2006	June 11, 2012		José Luis Rodríguez Zapatero (President of the Government)
69	Luis María Linde de Castro (1945- )	June 11, 2012	June 11, 2018		Mariano Rajoy (President of the Government)
70	Pablo Hernández de Cos (1971- )	June 11, 2018	11 June 2024		Mariano Rajoy (President of the Government)
-	Margarita Delgado (acting governor)	June 11, 2024	September 6, 2024		
71	José Luis Escrivá (1960- )	September 6, 2024			Pedro Sánchez (President of the Government)
