= Inés Alberdi =

Spanish sociologist

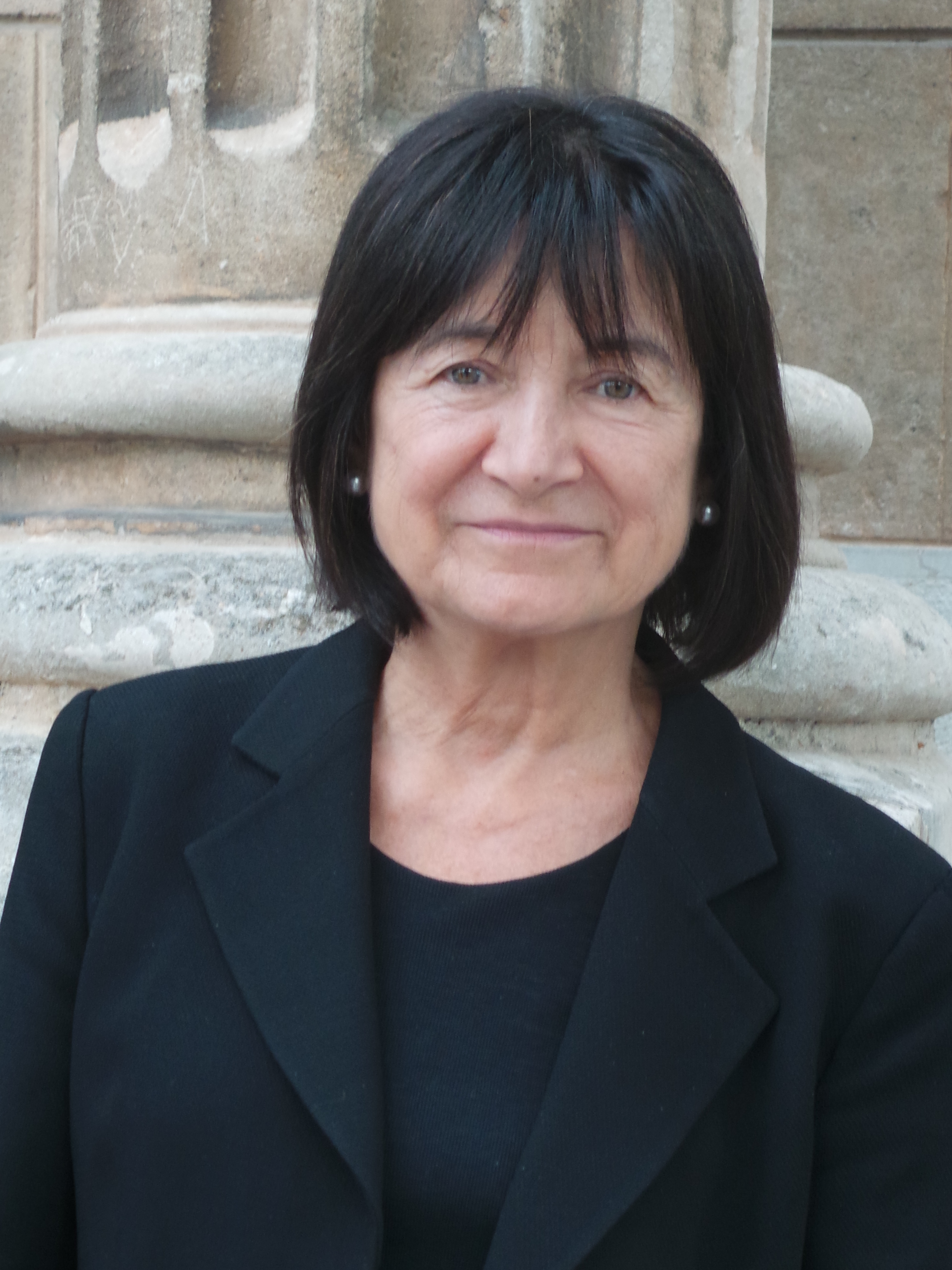
- Born: 11 February 1948 (age 78)
- Occupations: Sociologist, Professor

Inés Alberdi (born 11 February 1948) was the executive director of UNIFEM and has been a noted academic, policy advisor and policy maker on family and women's issues. Eisenhower Fellowships selected Inés Alberdi in 1998 to represent Spain.

== Career ==
Her previous posts have included the following work: Deputy for the Spanish Socialist Workers' Party in the Madrid Assembly (2003 to 2007); at the Equal Opportunities Unit of the European Commission on the networks Family and Work and Diversification of Occupational Choices for Women (1998–2000); Advisor to the Inter-American Bank as Adviser for Women in Development (1989–1990); Associate Researcher at George Washington University, Washington, DC (1988–1989); Member of the Board of INSTRAW, the United Nations International Research and Training Institute for the Advancement of Women (1986–1989); Professor of Sociology at Madrid University and Director for Research at the Centre for Sociological Research (1992–1993); Visiting Scholar in the Department of Sociology at Georgetown University, Washington, DC (1978–1979)

== Family ==
Her husband, Miguel Ángel Fernández Ordóñez, is the former governor of the Bank of Spain and her sister is a former Social Affairs Minister Cristina Alberdi. She has two children.

== Publications ==
- Alberdi, Inés (2007) Los hombres jóvenes y la paternidad (Fundación BBVA, Madrid),
- Alberdi, Inés (2005) Violencia: Tolerancia cero (with Luis Rojas Marcos, Obra Social de la Fundación la Caixa, Barcelona)
- Alberdi, Inés (2000) Las mujeres jóvenes en España (Ediciones La Caixa, Barcelona).
