= Felipe Sánchez Román y Gallifa =

Spanish jurist

Deputy of Madrid
- In office 28 June 1931 – 9 October 1933

Minister without Portfolio
- In office 19 July 1936 – 19 July 1936

Personal details
- Born: 12 March 1893 Madrid, Spain
- Died: 21 January 1956 (aged 62) Mexico City, Mexico
- Occupation: Jurist

Felipe Sánchez-Román y Gallifa (12 March 1893 – 21 January 1956) was a prominent Spanish jurist who taught at the Central University of Madrid from 1916 to 1936. He supported overthrow of the monarchist dictatorship of the 1920s, and was Deputy for Madrid in the Constituent Cortes of 1931. He was much respected for his balanced views by the political leaders of the Second Spanish Republic (1931–1939). In 1934 he founded the tiny but influential center-left Partido Nacional Republicano (PNR), and fought to avoid a republican government dominated by extreme left revolutionaries. After this happened in 1936 and the Spanish Civil War broke out he moved to France in 1937. In 1939 he went into exile in Mexico, where he taught at the UNAM Faculty of Law.

== Birth and education (1893–1915) ==
Felipe Sánchez Román y Gallifa was born in Madrid on 12 March 1893. His father, Felipe Sánchez Román, was from Valladolid and was a professor of civil law at the Central University of Madrid. His mother, Encarnación Gallifa Lombarte, was from Zaragoza. He attended the Instituto Cardenal Cisneros^{(es)} in Madrid for his secondary education, and obtained his bachillerato on 24 April 1909 with a grade of "outstanding".

Sánchez-Román studied law at the Faculty of Law of the Central University of Madrid from 1908 to 1913. He obtained a law degree with a special prize on 24 June 1913. He was licensed in law on 18 December 1913. On 1 March 1914 he was accepted as a legal officer by the General Directorate of Registries and as a notary by the Spanish Ministry of Grace and Justice. He studied for his doctorate at the Faculty of Law of the Central University of Madrid, and obtained his doctorate on 17 September 1914 with a grade of "outstanding" and a special prize. On 27 January 1915 he obtained the extraordinary doctoral prize for a thesis on the coercive power of the state. On 26 February 1915 Sánchez-Román was appointed interim assistant at the Central University of Madrid, and taught Natural Law and Roman Law. He was granted the degree of Doctor of Law on 15 April 1916.

== Early career (1915–1931) ==
On 1 December 1916 he was appointed to the Chair of Civil Law of the Faculty of Law in the Central University of Madrid, which had been made vacant by the death of his father. His rival was Demófilo de Buen^{(es)}. He was Professor of Spanish Common and Civil Law at the Faculty of Law of the Central University of Madrid from 30 December 1916 to 22 July 1929. On 7 July 1917 Sánchez-Román married Ángeles Correa Ruiz in Madrid. They had five children: Felipe (1918), María Ángeles (1919), Ana María (1920), Alfredo (1922) and María Soledad (1925). Between 1918 and 1939 Sánchez Román practiced as a lawyer as a member of the Colleges of Madrid, Barcelona, Sevilla, Valencia, Valladolid, Burgos and San Sebastián. He was professor at the Royal Academy of Jurisprudence and Legislation of Madrid from 1928 to 1930. On 22 April 1919 Sánchez-Román was appointed secretary of the Law School of the Central University in place of Ismael Calvo Madroño^{(es)}, who had died.

Sánchez-Román resigned his chair at the Madrid Faculty of Law by a letter of 27 May 1929 to the Minister of Public Instruction and Fine Arts. He gave as his reason the "most serious public accusations" that had been made by the Head of Government, which made it impossible to continue to teach. The King accepted his resignation through Royal Decree of 22 July 1929, and ordered him to also resign his title as University Professor. On appeal the Supreme Court found that he had been wrongly dismissed, and as of 5 February 1930 he was reinstated.

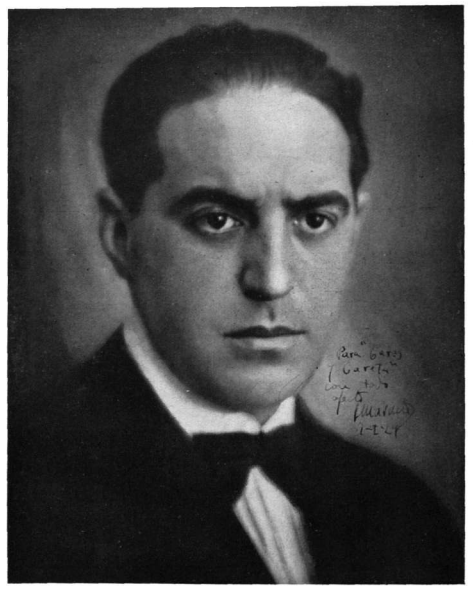
Gregorio Marañón invited Sánchez-Román to join the revolutionary committee.

Sánchez-Román was involved in the Pact of San Sebastián of 17 August 1930, the first serious effort to unite the anti-monarchist forces. He was invited to join by Gregorio Marañón. At this meeting representatives from almost all the republican groups formed a "revolutionary committee" headed by Niceto Alcalá-Zamora. This committee eventually became the first provisional government of the Second Spanish Republic. He was one of the signatories of the manifesto of 15 December 1930, although he declined an invitation to be part of the future government. He travelled to Burgos to head the republican movement in that city. He was defense lawyer for the National Revolutionary Committee, which included Francisco Largo Caballero, a leader of the Socialist Unión General de Trabajadores who was arrested after the failed Jaca uprising in December 1930. Sánchez-Román was so much involved in the planned uprising that it was surprising he was not arrested himself. In his defense of the leaders of the revolt he display unusual passion, in contrast to his usual cool urbanity.

== Second Spanish Republic (1931–1936) ==
In April 1931 Sánchez-Román was appointed President of the Technical-Agrarian Commission of the Provisional Government of the Spanish Republic. He was assisted by Agustín Viñuales and Antonio Flores de Lemus in preparing the plans for agrarian reform. However, the government rejected these plans due to opposition from Niceto Alcalá-Zamora and Miguel Maura. Sánchez-Román was deputy for Madrid in the Constituent Cortes that assembled in July 1931. He spoke in parliament on agrarian and religious matters, on the Court of Constitutional Guarantees, the Statute of Catalonia and other matters. In September 1931 he was discussed as a potential candidate for President of the Republic, but he resigned from the government's legal advisory committee due to dissatisfaction with the political evolution of the republican regime and objections to the appointment of Jaime Carner as Minister of Finance.

Sánchez-Román was a member of the Spanish Group of the Permanent Court of Arbitration of The Hague from 1931 to 1939. From 1933 to 1936 he was professor of Doctoral Studies of Private Law at the Faculty of Law of the Central University of Madrid. In 1934 he was academic elect of the Academy of Moral and Political Sciences of Madrid. He was lawyer of the Spanish government in international litigation, including cases before the Permanent Court of International Justice of The Hague.

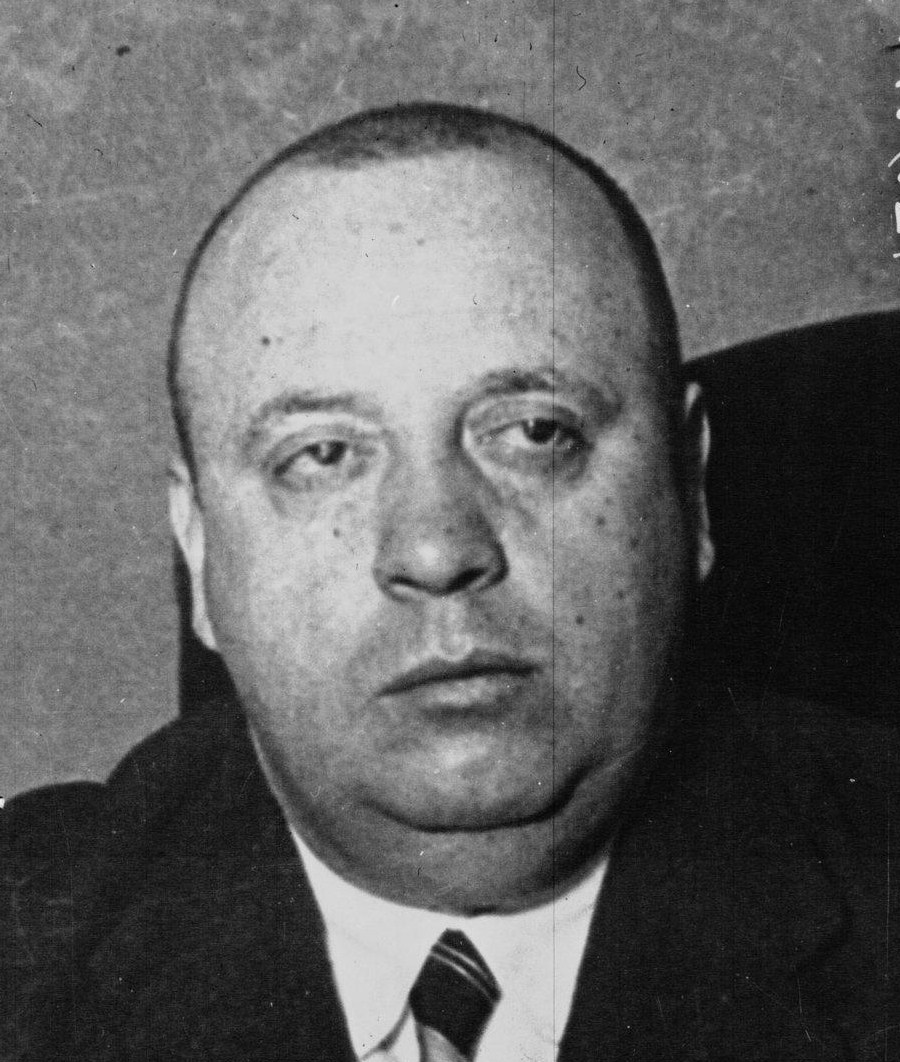
The Liberal Indalecio Prieto was a friend of Sánchez-Román.

In the summer of 1934 some of the left-leaning Radicals in parliament moved over to join Manuel Azaña, while others became independents led by Joaquín Chapaprieta. In July 1934 Sánchez-Román organized the Partido Nacional Republicano (PNR), which took a position somewhat to the right of the Union Republicana of Diego Martínez Barrio. The PNR was a small party whose members were mostly progressive professionals with a few progressive small industrialists. It was envisioned as a bridge between the Unión Republicana (Republican Union) and the Izquierda Republicana (Republican Left). Sánchez-Román was among the most moderate and responsible leaders of the left Republicans, and was probably the most respected by Azaña. On the fourth anniversary of the founding of the Republic, 14 April 1935, Sanchez Roman published an article in Indalecio Prieto's newspaper El Liberal calling for unity of the left.

During the formation of the Popular Front in January 1936 he recognized the need to include the socialists, but at the last minute on the night of 14 January 1936 withdrew his party from the coalition, probably because it included Communists whose goal was to destroy the 1931 constitution. He had insisted that the program must include "the express prohibition, even in propaganda, of revolutionary tactics and the need to suppress the militarized youth groups", a position that Azana would not promote. On 15 January 1936 Sánchez-Román dissolved the PRN. Azaña's Left Republican government took office on 19 February 1936, a weak minority government. Azaña offered Sánchez-Román the job of Premier, but he refused since he did not think the government was viable.

On 10 May 1936 Azaña was chosen as President of the Republic. Azaña himself would have preferred Sánchez-Román as president, but this was not practical since he was not a Popular Front member. As the crisis deepened the PNR leaders agreed on 25 May 1936 on a statement by Sánchez-Román calling for social reforms and acts to prevent revolutionary violence, including bans on instigation to violence and paramilitary groups. The proposal could be interpreted as one for a republican dictatorship or authoritarian government, and was similar to a proposal by Miguel Maura. Azaña refused to accept this advice.

== Spanish Civil War (1936–1939) ==
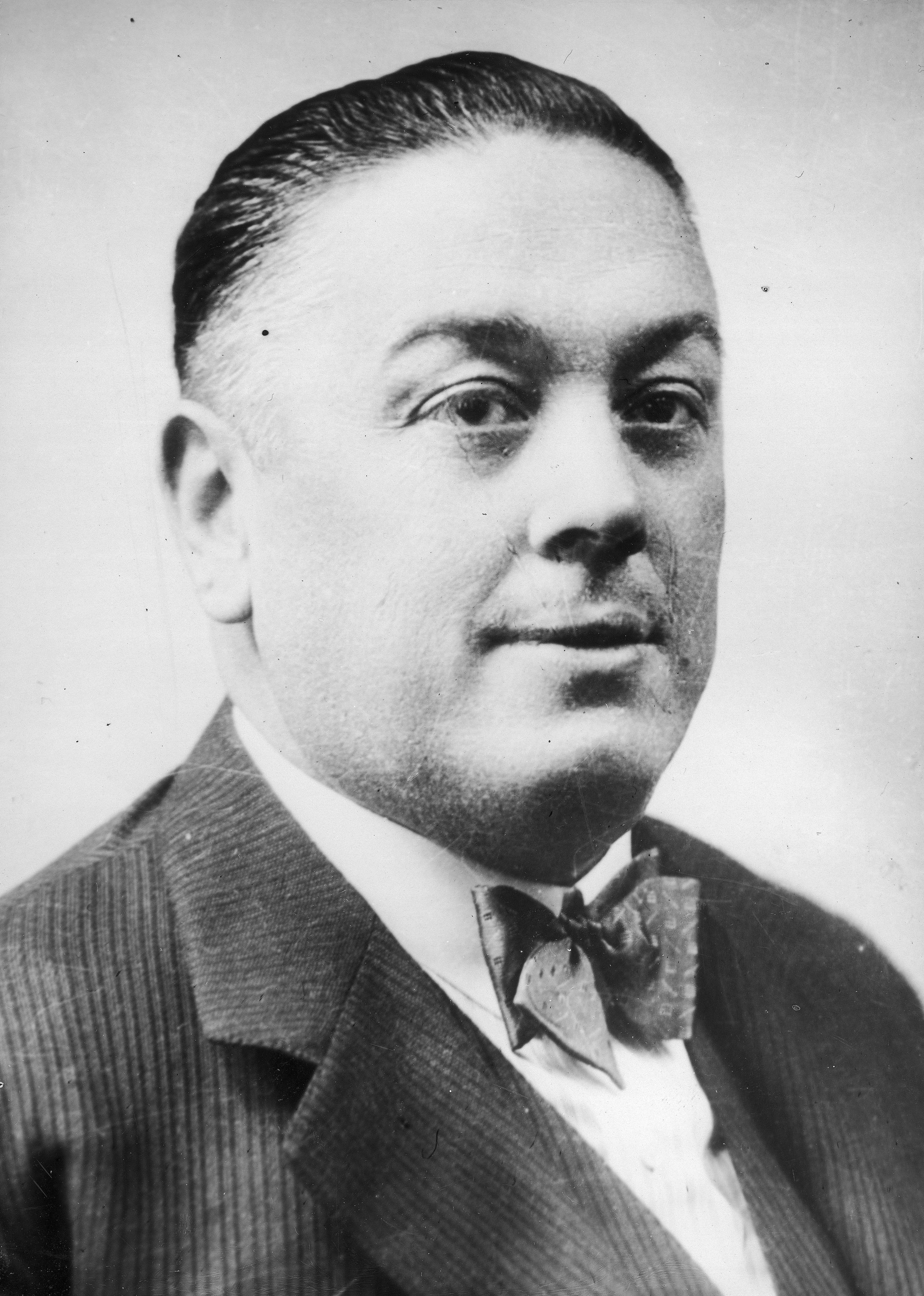
Sánchez-Román was a minister in the ephemeral government of Diego Martínez Barrio.

After the start of the Falangist uprising, in the small hours of the morning of 19 July 1936 Sánchez-Román agreed to serve in Diego Martínez Barrio's left-center coalition government in an attempt to maintain constitutional government against both the right-wing rebels and the left-wing revolutionaries. When he arrived at the Presidential Palace he was told that groups of workers demanding arms had appeared outside the ministry of the interior. He told Martínez Barrio that to yield to their demands would be "ineffective militarily and pregnant with inconceivable dangers politically." Only Largo Caballero spoke in favour of arms distribution, but only Martínez Barrio spoke against it. The Martinez Barrio government collapsed at 8:00 a.m. that morning in the face of opposition from the Socialists and Communists, and was replaced by a new government headed by José Giral.

His family moved to France in August 1936, but Sánchez-Román remained in Madrid at least until December 1936 when the first major offensive by the rebel troops had been repelled. He left on the advice of his friend Indalecio Prieto, who felt his life was at risk due to the hostility of the Communists. By August 1937 he was living in France. On 4 February 1939 Sánchez-Román was dismissed from his chair at the university by the government of General Francisco Franco. (Note: On 23 March 1946 the Special Tribunal for Repression of Freemasonry and Communism issued a summary that said Sánchez-Román was hiding abroad, apparently in Mexico. He was sentenced in absentia on 20 May 1946.)

== Mexico (1939–1956) ==
After the republican defeat in the Spanish Civil War Sánchez-Román moved from France to New York City, where he was offered a chair at Columbia University. However, he chose to accept an invitation from President Lázaro Cárdenas to settle in Mexico, which he entered by train on 17 April 1939. He arrived in Mexico City with his wife Ángeles Correa and their five children and stayed for a short period in the Hotel Reforma, then for six months in the Hotel Montejo on the Paseo de Reforma. He lived in Mexico City for the remainder of his life. He was consultant lawyer to the Presidency of the Republic from 1940 to 1946 and was involved in legal aspects of expropriation and compensation for oil industry properties. In 1939 he proposed creation of the Institute of Comparative Law at the National Autonomous University of Mexico (UNAM). This was done in 1940, with Sánchez-Román named the first director on 7 May 1940. He held office until March 1941, when he resigned so he could devote himself to teaching comparative law in the National School of Jurisprudence of the UNAM, which he joined in 1940.

Sánchez-Román also practiced law, mainly as a source of legal opinions. Sánchez-Román headed the legal departments of companies such as Fundidora de Fierro y Acero de Monterrey, Minera del Norte, Mexicana de Comercio Exterior, Siderúrgica de Monterrey, and Cerro del Mercado. He was a director of the Compañía Mexicana de Crédito Industrial. He joined the Unión de Intelectuales Españoles en México, created in 1947. His wife died on 30 September 1949. On 1 March 1950 he was appointed Doctoral Professor of Comparative Law in the National School of Jurisprudence, and started teaching in 1951. In 1953 his poor health forced him to take indefinite leave from UNAM. He was again consultant lawyer to the Presidency of the Republic in 1953 during the presidency of Adolfo Ruiz Cortines. He died in Mexico City after a long illness on 23 January 1956. (Note: Other sources say, incorrectly, that Martínez Chávez died on 21 January 1956 rather than 23 January 1956.)

== Publications ==
- Felipe Sánchez Román y Gallifa (1914), Sobre las dos últimas palabras de artículo 1901 del Código civil (Trabajo doctoral)
- Demófilo deBuen (1932), Introducción al estudio del derecho civil: ideas generales, fuentes históricas del derecho civil español, codificación, normas jurídicas, prólogo de Felipe Sanchez Román y Gallifa, Madrid, Revista de Derecho Privado, p. 458
- Adolfo García González (1932), El poder judicial, prólogo de Felipe Sánchez-Román y Gallifa (Reus. ed.), Madrid
- Felipe Sánchez Román y Gallifa (6 May 1932), "Discurso sobre el Estatuto de Cataluña", Diario de Sesiones
- Raúl Carrancá Trujillo (1944), Las causas que excluyen la incriminación. Derecho mexicano y extranjero, prólogo de Felipe Sánchez-Román y Gallifa, México: Editorial Limón
- Demófilo de Buen Lozano (1977), Introducción al estudio del derecho civil: ideas generales, fuentes históricas del derecho civil español, codificación, normas jurídicas, prólogo de Felipe Sánchez-Román y Gallifa, nota preliminar de Néstor de Buen, México: Editorial Porrúa

== Sources ==
- Bolloten, Burnett (1991), The Spanish Civil War: Revolution and Counterrevolution, Univ of North Carolina Press, ISBN 978-0-8078-1906-7
- Casanova, Julián (2010), The Spanish Republic and Civil War, Cambridge, UK: Cambridge University Press, ISBN 978-0-521-49388-8
- "Curricula de los Directores" (PDF), Instituto de Investigaciones Jurídicas. Sexagésimo aniversario (in Spanish), UNAM: Instituto de Investigaciones Jurídicas, 2016, ISBN 978-968-36-8869-9, archived from the original (PDF) on 2007-09-27
- Dennis, Nigel (1986-01-01), José Bergamín: A Critical Introduction, 1920-1936, University of Toronto Press, Scholarly Publishing Division, ISBN 978-1-4875-9651-4
- Martínez Chávez, Eva Elizabeth (23 January 2012), "SÁNCHEZ-ROMÁN Y GALLIFA, Felipe (1893-1956)", Diccionario de catedráticos españoles de derecho (1847-1943) (in Spanish), Universidad Carlos III de Madrid. Instituto Figuerola de Historia y Ciencias Sociales
- Payne, Stanley G. (2008-10-01), The Collapse of the Spanish Republic, 1933-1936: Origins of the Civil War, Yale University Press, ISBN 978-0-300-13080-5
- Pike, David Wingeate (October 1996), "La Victoire du Front Populaire en Espagne (Février 1936): La Réaction de la Droite en France", Guerres Mondiales et Conflits Contemporains (in French) (184), Presses Universitaires de France: 85–92, JSTOR 25732380
- Serrano Migallón, Fernando (2003), Los maestros del exilio español en la Facultad de Derecho (in Spanish), UNAM, ISBN 978-970-07-4334-9
- Villa Garcia, Roberto (October–December 2016), "Los orígenes de la Guerra Civil", Cuadernos de Pensamiento Político (in Spanish) (52), FAES, Fundacion para el Analisis y los Estudios Sociales: 89–94, JSTOR 44136860
