= Alfredo de Zavala y Lafora =

Spanish politician

- Portrait c. 1935 by A. Castellanos

Governor of the Bank of Spain
- In office March 1934 – February 1935
- Preceded by: Manuel Marraco Ramón
- Succeeded by: Alejandro Fernández de Araoz
- In office May 1935 – February 1936
- Preceded by: Alejandro Fernández de Araoz
- Succeeded by: Luis Nicolau d'Olwer

Minister of Finance
- In office 3 April 1935 – 6 May 1935
- Preceded by: Manuel Marraco Ramón
- Succeeded by: Joaquín Chapaprieta

Personal details
- Born: 25 May 1893 Madrid, Spain
- Died: 7 March 1995 (aged 101) Madrid, Spain
- Occupation: Lawyer

Alfredo de Zavala y Lafora (25 May 1893 – 7 March 1995) was a Spanish lawyer. During the Second Spanish Republic he served as Governor of the Bank of Spain, and briefly as Minister of Finance.

== Birth and education (1895–1931) ==
Alfredo Zavala Lafora was born in Madrid on 25 May 1893. His parents were Alfredo Zavala y Camps, a government attorney who was briefly acting Minister of Finance in 1910 and 1911, and Isabel Lafora y Calatayud. His family was Basque in origin. He was the oldest son, and grew up in an austere environment with great emphasis on study and culture. Zavala Lafora studied at the Colegio de San Miguel (later to become the French Lyceum) and then at the Padres Escolapios de Getafe. He began work early at the Ministry of Finance, while also studying for a law degree, which he obtained a year earlier than usual.

Zavala Lafora graduated in Law at the Central University of Madrid. He was one of the first to ski in Spain, and was a founding partner of the Spanish Alpine Club (Club Alpino Español). After his military service, in 1916 Zavala won a job competition to become a State Attorney. On 20 January 1922 he was appointed Secretary of the board of directors of Minas de Barruelo S.A., a private company. He gained a reputation as a distinguished lawyer. Zavala Lafora married Milagros Richi. In 1930 he joined the Progressive Party (Partido Progresista).

== Second Republic (1931–39) ==
On 16 April 1931, just after the Second Spanish Republic had been proclaimed, the Minister of Finance Indalecio Prieto appointed Zavala Lafora Director General of Debt and Liabilities in his ministry. Prieto later appointed him Director General of Property and Territorial Contribution. This office included the Presidency of the Administration Council of the Mines of Almaden and Arrayanes, which involved participation in Mercurio Europeo, an organization formed in Italy to control the price of mercury. On 16 October 1932 the Congress of Deputies approved Article 24 of the new constitution, which banned members of religious orders from teaching in Spain. Zavala Lafora, a Catholic, resigned from the Directorate General and resumed his post as State Attorney in the Central Economic Administrative Court.

In November 1932 Prime Minister Manuel Azaña offered Zavala Lafora the position of Permanent State Advisor for the Treasury Section. He held this office until February 1934, when he was appointed Governor of the Bank of Spain. He succeeded Manuel Marraco Ramón in this position, and held office from March 1934 to April 1935. While in this position he was appointed director of the Compañía Arrendataria de Tabacos, which later became Tabacalera. Zavala Lafora was appointed Minister of Finance by Alejandro Lerroux on 3 April 1935, holding office until 6 May 1935. During this period Alejandro Fernández de Araoz acted as Governor of the Bank of Spain. After a month Lerroux submitted the resignation of the entire cabinet.

Zavala Lafora resumed his position at the Bank of Spain in May 1935. He was succeeded as Minister of Finance by Joaquín Chapaprieta. He resigned from the Bank of Spain when the Popular Front won the elections of 1936 since he did not agree with the new government's policies. In February 1936 he was replaced as Governor of the Bank of Spain by Luis Nicolau d'Olwer. Zavala Lafora returned to his office of State Attorney at the Central Administrative Economic Court. At the end of June 1936 he took leave so he could devote himself to private legal practice.

== Later career (1939–95) ==
In 1940 Zavala Lafora was appointed to the boards of Tabacalera, Sociedad Española del Acumulador Tudor and Banco Zaragozano^{(es)}. He was later made chairman of the boards of the first two. He resigned at the age of 80 while still enjoying excellent physical and mental health, and was named honorary president of both companies. On his 100th birthday Prime Minister Felipe González decorated him with the Cross of Honour of the Order of St. Raymond of Peñafort. Don Alfredo Zavala Lafora died in Madrid on 7 March 1995.

== Sources ==
- García Moliner, Ramón (January–June 2006), "Alfredo de Zavala Lafora" (PDF), Abogados del Estado (in Spanish) (12–13), Asociación de Abogados del Estado, archived from the original (PDF) on 2016-03-03
- Gobernadores del Banco de España (in Spanish), BDE: Banco de España, 20 May 2010
- Sampedro, José Luis; Merry Val, Fernando Alos (2005), "ALFREDO ZAVALA LAFORA" (PDF), Ministros de Hacienda y de Economía, Ministero de Economía y Hacienda, ISBN 84-85482-82-4, archived from the original (PDF) on 2018-05-29
- "Zabala Lafora, Alfredo", Auñamendi Eusko Entziklopledia (in Basque), Eusko Ikaskuntza
