= Malcolm Knight =

Canadian economist

Malcolm D. Knight
- Born: Windsor, Ontario
- Education: Ph.D., London School of Economics and Political Science, University of London, 1972 M.Sc. (Economics), London School of Economics and Political Science, 1968 Honour B.A. in Political Science and Economics, University of Toronto, 1967 Matriculation, Amherstburg District High School, Amherstburg, Ontario, Canada, 1963

Malcolm D. Knight is a Canadian economist, policymaker and banker. He is currently Visiting Professor of Finance at the London School of Economics and Political Science and a Distinguished Fellow at the Center for International Governance Innovation. From 2008 to 2012, Knight was Vice Chairman of Deutsche Bank Group where he was responsible for developing and coordinating the bank's global approach to issues in financial regulation, supervision, and financial stability. He served as general manager of the Bank for International Settlements from 2003 to 2008 and as Senior Deputy Governor of the Bank of Canada (1999-2003), after holding senior positions at the International Monetary Fund (1975-1999).

== Career ==
Malcolm Knight received an Honour B.A. in Political Science and Economics from the University of Toronto, where he was a member of the Alpha Delta Phi. He later received a M.Sc. (Economics) and Ph.D. degree from the London School of Economics and Political Science.

From 1971 to 1975 Knight taught at the University of Toronto and then at the London School of Economics.

In 1975 Knight joined the Research Department of the International Monetary Fund, where he was an economist in the financial studies division before becoming Chief of external adjustment issues and then Assistant Director of the Research Department for developing country studies. In 1992 Knight moved to the operational departments of the IMF where he served, successively, as Deputy Director of the Middle East Department, the Monetary and Exchange Affairs Department, and the European 1 Department.

While at the IMF, Knight also served for many years as an adjunct professor with the Center for Canadian Studies at the Johns Hopkins University School of Advanced International Studies. During 1985-86 Knight was an Academic Visitor at the Centre for Labour Economics, London School of Economics and Political Science, and he served for 11 years, until 1997, on the editorial board of the IMF Staff Papers.

In 1999 Knight was appointed Senior Deputy Governor of the Bank of Canada. As the number two in Canada's central bank, Knight was its chief operating officer and a member of its board of directors. His key duties included overseeing strategic planning and coordinating all the Bank's operations, acting for the Governor, and sharing responsibility for the conduct of monetary policy as a member of the Bank's Governing Council.

Malcolm Knight became General Manager and chief executive officer of the Bank for International Settlements (BIS) in April 2003. He was the first person from outside Europe to hold this position. On 20 June 2008, Knight announced that he would take a position with Deutsche Bank and that he would leave the BIS on 30 September 2008.

Knight was Vice Chairman of Deutsche Bank Global Group, based in New York, from October 2008 to March 2012, overseeing the firm's relationships and interaction with global regulators and central banks.

== Honours and memberships ==
Knight was awarded an Honorary Doctorate by Trinity College, University of Toronto in 2006, and was inducted as a Member of the Johns Hopkins University Society of Scholars in May 2007. In 2006 he was also inducted as a Member of the Honorary Senate of the Lindau Nobel Laureate Meetings.

In addition to his duties as CEO of the BIS during 2003–08, Knight was a Trustee of the International Accounting Standards Committee Foundation (now the IFRS Foundation), which oversees the work of the London-based International Accounting Standards Board in developing accounting standards that over 100 countries are committed to adopt. During 2003-08 Knight was a member of the Financial Stability Forum (now the Financial Stability Board), reporting to the G8 and G20 finance ministers on vulnerabilities in the international financial system; and of the Capital Markets Consultative Group of the International Monetary Fund. During 2010 - 2014, Knight was a member of the Board of Directors of Swiss Re Ltd. After stepping down as Vice Chairman of Deutsche Bank in 2012 he continued to be a consultant to the bank until March 2014. He currently serves on the Boards of the International Valuation Standards Council and the Global Risk Institute in Financial Services (Toronto), and he is a member of the International Advisory Council of the Risk Management Institute of the University of Singapore and the North American Advisory Board of the London School of Economics and Political Science. In addition, Knight is a Trustee of the Per Jacobsson Foundation, which organises lectures by eminent figures in the economic and financial community, a member of the Board of Patrons of the European Association for Banking and Financial History, and a member of the Board of the New Jersey Center for the Visual Arts. He has been a Visiting Professor of Finance at the London School of Economics and Political Science since September 2008.

== Publications ==
- "Canada's Banks: Too Conservative to Fail?" in Greg Anderson and Christopher Sands, eds., Forgotten Partnership Redux: Canada-U.S. Relations in the 21st Century, Amherst, NY: Cambria Press, 2011, Chapter 9.
- Unwinding Financial Sector Interventions: Preconditions and Practical Considerations; Edited by Udaibir S. Das and Michael G. Papaioannou; Washington, DC; International Monetary Fund, 2010; pps. 19–22.
- "International Cooperation For The Best Talent In Economics" in 10 Years of Foundation Lindau Nobelprizewinners Meetings at Lake Constance, Edited by Christian Rappa and Nikolaus Turner; Albert Schnell GmbH, Hamburg; pps. 163–165.
- "Mitigating Moral Hazard in Dealing with Problem Financial Institutions: Too Big to Fail? Too Complex to Fail? Too Interconnected to Fail?" in Financial Crisis Management and Bank Resolution; Edited by John Raymond Labrosse, Rodrigo Olivares-Caminal and Dalvinder Singh, Publisher: Informa Law, 2009.
- "Finding Stability" in The G20 London Summit: Growth, Stability, Jobs, Edited by John Kirton and Madeline Koch, Publisher: Newsdesk Media, London, 2009.
- "Reforming the Global Financial Architecture: Just Tinkering at the Edges?" With L. Schembri and J. Powell. In The IMF and its Critics: Reforming the Architecture of Global Economic Institution. Edited by D. Vines and C.L. Gilbert. Cambridge University Press, 2004.
- "The Bank of Canada's Approach to Inflation Targeting." 2004. With R. Fay and B. O'Reilly. In Statistical Implications of Inflation Targeting: Getting the Right Numbers and Getting the Numbers Right. Carol S. Carson et al. (eds.) Washington, D.C.: International Monetary Fund; 2002.
- "The Central Bank's Role in Fostering Financial System Stability: A Canadian Perspective". In Financial Risks, Stability, and Globalisation 312–319, edited by O.E.G. Johnson. Washington, D.C.: International Monetary Fund; 2002.
- Transforming Financial Systems in the Baltics, Russia, and Other Countries of the Former Soviet Union. Edited by M. Knight, A.B. Petersen, and R.T. Price. Washington, D.C.: International Monetary Fund; 1999.
- "Developing and Transition Countries Confront Financial Globalization." Finance and Development 36 (2): 32–35.1999.
- "Developing Countries and the Globalization of Financial Markets." World Development 26 (7): 1185–1201; 1998.
- "Current Accounts: What is Their Relevance for Economic Policymaking?" With F. Scacciavillani. In Proceedings of the Austrian National Bank Conference on "Current Accounts: What Is Their Significance for Policymakers?"; 1998.
- "Economic Determinants of IMF Financial Arrangements." With J.A. Santaella Journal of Development Economics 54 (2): 405- 36; 1997.
- "Central Bank Reforms in the Baltics, Russia, and the Other Countries of the Former Soviet Union." Edited by M D Knight. IMF Occasional Paper No. 157. Washington, D.C.: International Monetary Fund; 1997.
- The Canadian Economy. Revised Edition. Washington, D.C.: Association for Canadian Studies in the United States, co-published with Michigan State University Press; 1996.
- "The Peace Dividend: Military Spending Cuts and Economic Growth." With N. Loayza and D. Villanueva. IMF Staff Papers 43 (1): 1-37; 1996.
- "Measuring the Peace Dividend." With N. Loayza. DECnotes No. 6. Washington, D.C.: The World Bank; 1996
- "Testing the Neoclassical Theory of Economic Growth: A Panel Data Approach." With N. Loayza and D. Villanueva. IMF Staff Papers 40 (3): 512–41; 1993.
- "Economic Interactions and the Fiscal Policies of Major Industrial Countries: 1980 1988." With P.R. Masson. In Private Behaviour and Government Policy in Interdependent Economies, 282–334, edited by A.S. Courakis and M.P. Taylor. Oxford: Oxford University Press; 1990.
- The Canadian Economy. Washington, D.C.: Association for Canadian Studies in the United States; 1989.
- "Fiscal Policies, Net Saving, and Real Exchange Rates: The United States, the Federal Republic of Germany, and Japan."With P.R. Masson. In International Aspects of Fiscal Policies, 21-71, edited by J.A. Frenkel. Chicago and London: NBER/University of Chicago Press; 1988.
- "Import Compression and Export Performance in Developing Countries." With M.S. Khan. The Review of Economics and Statistics 70 (2): 315–21; 1988.
- "Theoretical Aspects of the Design of Fund Supported Adjustment Programs." A study by the Research Department of the International Monetary Fund. IMF Occasional Paper No. 55. Washington, D.C.: International Monetary Fund; 1987.
- "International Transmission of Fiscal Policies in Major Industrial Countries." With P. R. Masson. IMF Staff Papers 33 (3): 387–438; 1986.
- "Do Fund Supported Adjustment Programs Retard Growth?". With M.S. Khan. Finance and Development 23 (1): 30–32; 1986.
- "Fund Supported Adjustment Programs and Economic Growth." With M.S. Khan. IMF Occasional Paper No. 41. Washington, D.C.: International Monetary Fund; 1985.
- "Issues in the Assessment of the Exchange Rates of Industrial Countries." A Study by the Research Department of the International Monetary Fund. With J.R. Artus. IMF Occasional Paper No. 29. Washington, D.C.: International Monetary Fund; 1984.
- "Economic Change and Policy Response in Canada under Fixed and Flexible Exchange Rates. "With D.J. Mathieson. In Economic Interdependence and Flexible Exchange Rates, 500-29, edited by J. Bhandari and B. Putnam. Cambridge Mass.: M.I.T. Press; 1983.
- "Determinants of Current Account Balances of Non Oil Developing Countries in the 1970s: An Empirical Analysis." With M.S. Khan. IMF Staff Papers 30 (4): 819–42; 1983.
- "Sources of Payments Problems in LDCs." With M.S. Khan. Finance and Development 20 (4): 2–5; 1983.
- "Some Theoretical and Empirical Issues Relating to Economic Stabilization in Developing Countries." With M.S. Khan. World Development 10 (9): 709–30; 1982.
- "Unanticipated Monetary Growth and Inflationary Finance." With M.S. Khan. Journal of Money, Credit and Banking 14 (3): 347–64; 1982.
- "Stabilization Programs in Developing Countries: A Formal Framework." With M.S. Khan. IMF Staff Papers 28 (1): 1-53; 1981.
- "Model of an Industrial Country under Fixed and Flexible Exchange Rates. With D.J. Mathieson. In Trade and Payments Adjustment Under Flexible Exchange Rates, edited by J. Martin and A. Smith. London: Macmillan; 1979.
- "A Macroeconomic Model of the United Kingdom." With. C.R. Wymer. IMF Staff Papers 25 (4): 742–78; 1978.
- "Reserve Currency Preferences of Central Banks." With H.R. Heller. Essays in International Finance 131. Department of Economics, Princeton University; 1978.
- "International Bank Lending in Perspective." With A.D. Crockett. Finance and Development 15 (4): 45–48; 1978.
- "The New International Monetary System: Some Issues." With J. Salop. Finance and Development 14 (2): 19–22. Reprinted in The Contemporary International Economy edited by J. Adams. New York; St. Martin's Press; 1977.
- "Euro Dollars, Capital Mobility and the Forward Exchange Market." Economica 44: 1-21; 1977.
- "A Monetary Model of an Open Economy with Particular Reference to the United Kingdom." With C.R. Wymer. In Essays in Economic Analysis, 153–71, edited by M.J. Artis and A.R. Nobay. Cambridge: Cambridge University Press; 1976.
- "A Continuous Disequilibrium Econometric Model of the Domestic and International Portfolio Behavior of the U.K. Banking System." In Essays in Modern Economics, edited by M. Parkin and A.R. Nobay. London: Longmans; 1973.

== Speeches ==
- Surmounting the Financial Crisis: Contrasts between Canadian and American Banks. Inaugural Thomas O. Enders Memorial Lecture, School of Advanced International Studies, Johns Hopkins University, Washington, DC, May 3, 2012.
- Enhancing Global Financial Stability: Is the G-20 Reform Program Sufficient? Presentation at Standard and Poor's Breakfast Event, London, March 14, 2012.
- Is Regulatory Reform Strengthening Global Financial Stability? Presentation at the International Finance Seminar, Harvard University, January 23, 2012.
- The Future of Bank Funding - Is it Covered? Keynote address to the Euro Debt Market Conference, Frankfurt-am-Main, November 17, 2011.
- A New Era of Cross Border Flows: A Return to Financial Repression? Presentation at the Third Annual Reinventing Bretton Woods Committee Conference, Cusco, Peru, July 18–19, 2011.
- The New Global Architecture of Financial Regulation: Can it Prevent Crises? Presentation at Columbia University, New York, May 5, 2011.
- New Developments in Financial Regulation. Special Lecture given at the London School of Economics as part of the Summer Program for Executives, London, 24 June 2010.
- Priorities in Risk Management and Regulation in Asia Today. Speech at the 2010 Asian Banker Summit, Singapore, 19 April 2010.
- The New Framework for Global Regulatory Reform - Will it Make the International Financial System More Stable? Keynote Speech at the Harvard Law School Symposium on: Building the Financial System of the 21st Century: an Agenda for Europe and the United States, Armonk, NY, 19 March 2010.
- The Global Financial Crisis and Reform of the Architecture of Regulation. Special Lecture presented at the London School of Economics and Political Science, London, 11 November 2009.
- What has the Global Crisis Taught us About Financial Risk Management? Keynote Speech at the Third Annual Risk Management Conference, National University of Singapore, Singapore, 16 July 2009.
- Mitigating Moral Hazard in Dealing with Problem Financial Institutions: Too Big to Fail? Too Complex to Fail? Too Interconnected to Fail? Keynote Speech at the First Annual Warwick Symposium on Financial Crisis Management and Bank Resolution, London, Coventry, 17 April 2009.
- Can We Establish General Principles to Guide Reform of the Global Architecture of Financial Regulation? Invited Lecture at the University of St. Gallen, Switzerland, 11 March 2009.
- Preparing for the Future: Where to Now for Regulation and Supervision in the Field of Securities? Speech at The Committee of European Securities Regulators Conference, Paris, 23 February 2009.
- The Global Financial Meltdown: What has it taught us about Risk Management? Keynote Speech at The Global Association of Risk Professionals, New York, 10 February 2009.
- Securitisation: was the tail wagging the dog?, 29 May 2008.
- European and international financial markets: a new era? Keynote address at the Aspen Seminar for Leaders, San Clemente Island, Venice, 16 May 2008.
- The euro as catalyst for global financial market deepening. Speech at the Brussels Economic Forum 2008 on Economic and Monetary Union in Europe: 10 Years On, Brussels, 15 May 2008.
- Weaknesses revealed by the market turmoil: where do we go from here? Keynote address at the Chatham House seminar on: The New Financial Frontiers, London, 29 April 2008.
- Some reflections on the future of the originate-to-distribute model in the context of the current financial turmoil. Speech at the Euro 50 Group Roundtable on: The future of the originate and distribute model, London, 21 April 2008.
- Now you see it, now you don't; the nature of risk and the current financial turmoil. Speech at the Ninth Annual Risk Management Convention and Exhibition of the Global Association of Risk Professionals, New York, 26 February 2008.
- Transparency and communication in monetary policy. Introductory remarks at the Joint BSP-BIS High-Level Conference on Transparency and Communication in Monetary Policy, Manila, 1 February 2008.
- The growing importance of Islamic finance in the global financial system. Remarks at the 2nd Islamic Financial Services Board Forum, Frankfurt, 6 December 2007.
- European financial integration in the context of current financial market turbulence. Keynote remarks at the 2007 Eurofi Conference Achieving the integration of European financial markets in a global context, Brussels, 3 December 2007.
- Globalisation and population trends: implications for labour markets and inflation. Opening remarks at the BIS Conference in Honour of Palle S Andersen, Basel, 3 December 2007.
- The current credit market turmoil: financial and macroeconomic implications. Presentation at the Group of Thirty International Banking Session on: The Evolving Structure of the World Economic System, Washington DC, 22 October 2007.
- Global banking: paradigm shift – managing transition. Speech at the Federation of Indian Chambers of Commerce and Industry (FICCI) – Indian Banks' Association (IBA) Conference, Mumbai, 12 September 2007.
- Prospects and policies for the global economy. Speech delivered on the occasion of the Bank's Annual General Meeting, Basel, 24 June 2007.
- The globalisation of financial markets and financial regulation: implications for Latin America. Presentation to the Centro para la Estabilidad Financiera, Buenos Aires, 5 June 2007
- Financial risks: a view from the BIS. Speech at the Central Bank of Argentina 2007 Money and Banking Conference, Buenos Aires, 4–5 June 2007.
- Inflation targeting in emerging market economies. Speech at the Seminar on Inflation Targeting, Bank of Morocco, 4 April 2007.
- Now you see it, now you don't: risk in the small and in the large. Keynote address at the Eighth Annual Risk Management Convention of the Global Association of Risk Professionals, 27–28 February 2007.
- Objectives and challenges of monetary policy. Speech at the Conference on Inflation Targeting, Magyar Nemzeti Bank, Budapest, 18–19 January 2007.

Preceded by Sir Andrew Crockett	General manager of the Bank for International Settlements; 2003 – 2008	Succeeded by Jaime Caruana
