= Alejandro Fernández de Araoz =

Alejandro Fernández de Araoz y de la Devesa
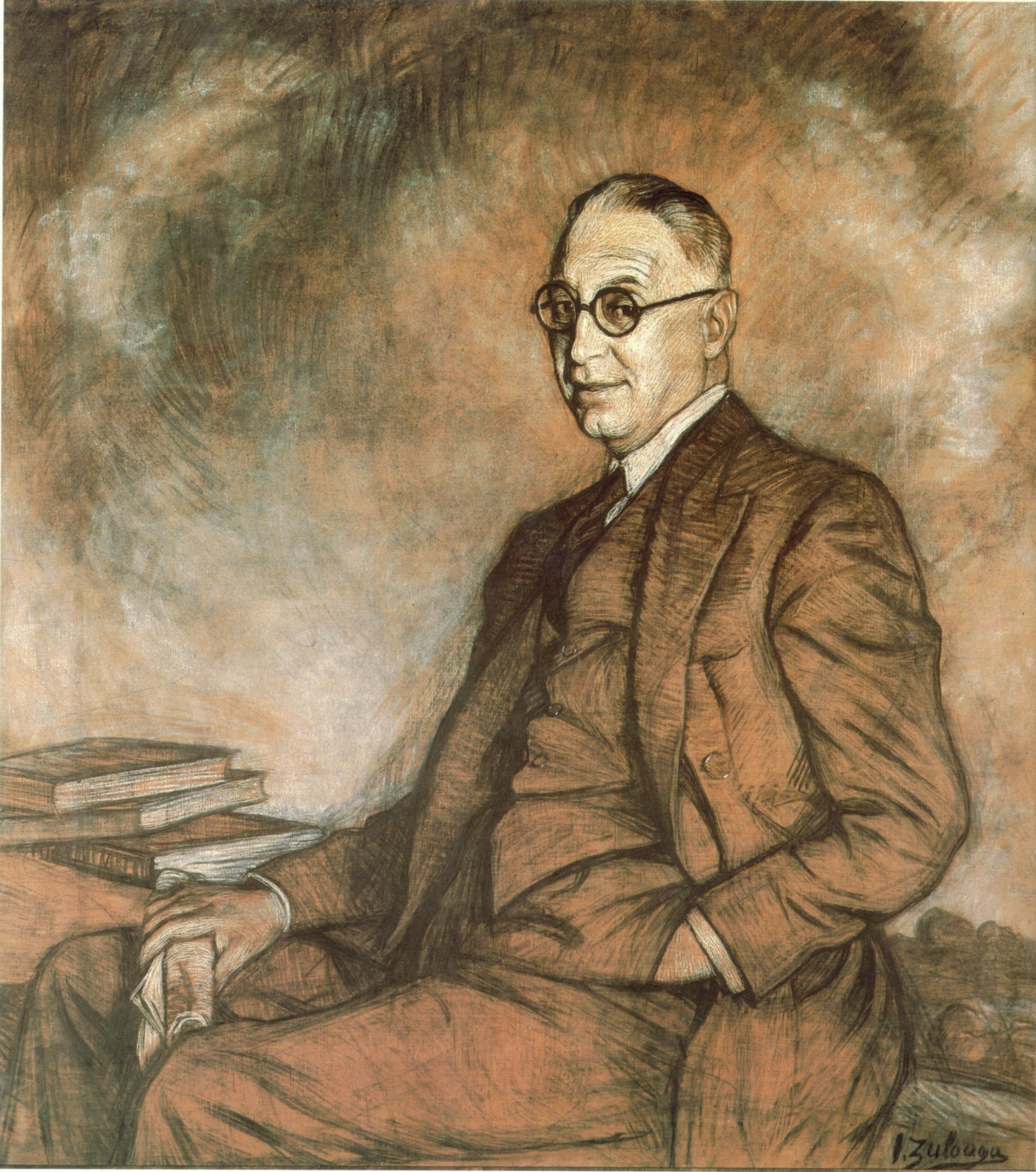
- Portrait by Zuloaga

Deputy for Ávila
- In office 8 May 1923 – 15 September 1923

Governor of the Bank of Spain
- In office 3 April 1935 – 6 May 1935
- Preceded by: Alfredo de Zavala y Lafora
- Succeeded by: Alfredo de Zavala y Lafora

Personal details
- Born: 1894
- Died: 8 November 1970 (aged 75–76) Madrid, Spain
- Occupation: Banker

Alejandro Fernández de Araoz y de la Devesa (1894 – 8 November 1970) was a Spanish lawyer and banker. During the Second Spanish Republic he was briefly Governor of the Bank of Spain.

== Life ==
Alejandro Fernández de Araoz y de la Devesa was born in 1894 in Medina del Campo, Valladolid, Spain. He was the son of Clemente Fernández de la Devesa and Margarita de Araoz Alonso. Fernández Araoz became a state attorney. He married Carmen Marañón y Moya (1913–2005). Their children were María del Carmen, María de los Dolores and Alejandro Fernández de Araoz Marañón.

Alejandro Fernández Araoz ran on a Left Liberal platform and was elected deputy for the Arévalo district of Ávila on 29 April 1923 by 5,730 votes out of 9,292. He held office from 8 May 1923 to 15 September 1923.

Alfredo de Zavala y Lafora was appointed Minister of Finance by Alejandro Lerroux on 3 April 1935, holding office until 6 May 1935. During this period Fernández Araoz acted as Governor of the Bank of Spain. After a month Lerroux submitted the resignation of the entire cabinet. Zavala Lafora resumed his position at the Bank of Spain in May 1935.

Alejandro Fernández de Araoz y de la Devesa died in Madrid on 8 November 1970. He was Chairman of the Board of the Banco Internacional de Comercio.

== Sources ==
- Fernández Araoz, Alejandro (in Spanish), Congreso de los Diputados
- García Moliner, Ramón (January–June 2006), "Alfredo de Zavala Lafora" (PDF), Abogados del Estado (in Spanish) (12–13), Asociación de Abogados del Estado, archived from the original (PDF) on 2016-03-03
- Gobernadores del Banco de España (in Spanish), BDE: Banco de España
- "Primer Aniversario del Excelentisimo Señor Don Alejandro Fernández de Araoz y de la Devesa", ABC de Madrid (in Spanish), Madrid, 6 November 1971
- Sampedro, José Luis; Merry Val, Fernando Alos (2005), "ALFREDO ZAVALA LAFORA" (PDF), Ministros de Hacienda y de Economía, Ministero de Economía y Hacienda, ISBN 84-85482-82-4, archived from the original (PDF) on 2018-05-29
- Velasco Berenguer, Gonzalo, "Alejandro Fernández de Araoz y de la Devesa", Geneanet (in Spanish)
