= Miguel Ángel Fernández Ordóñez =

Spanish economist and politician

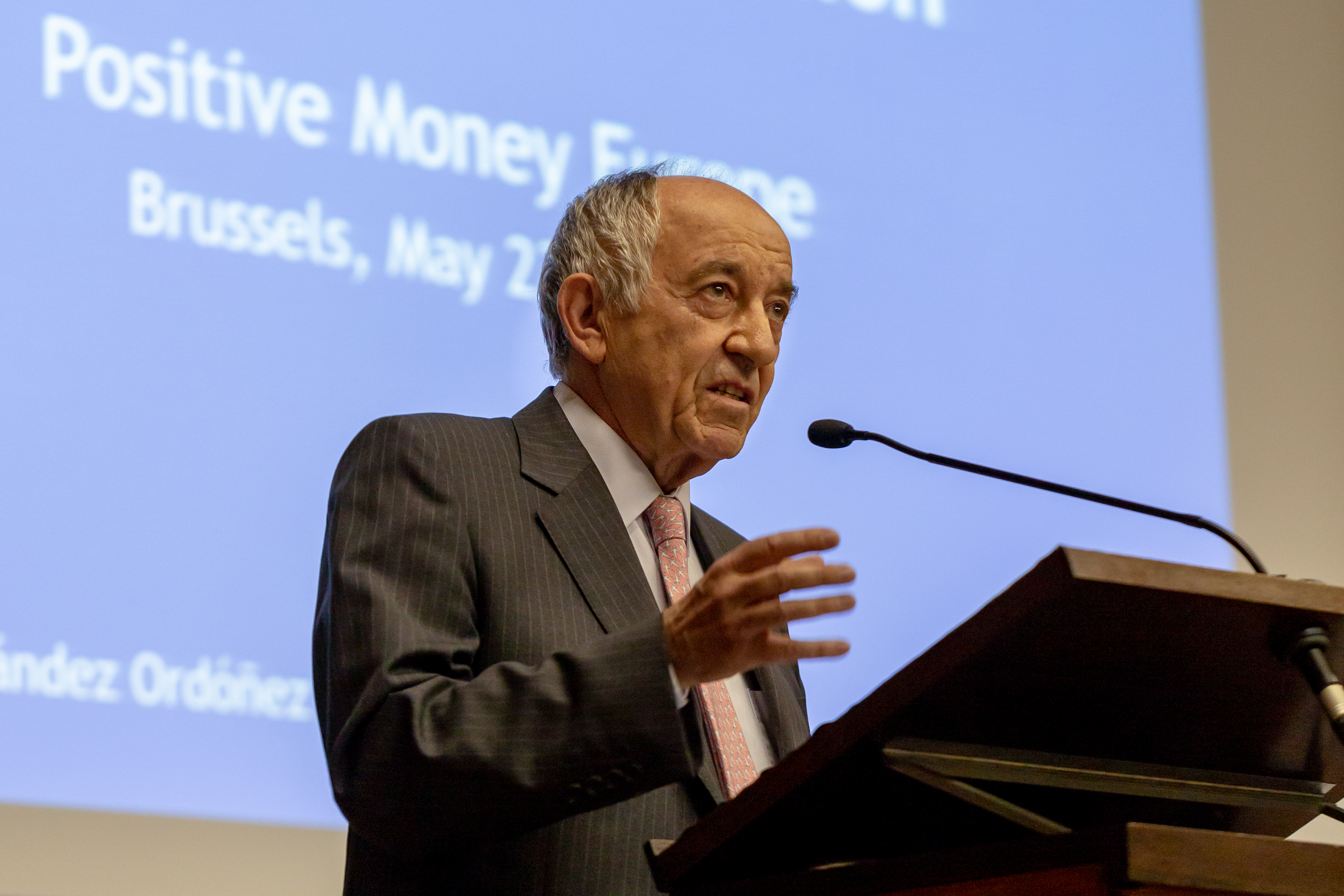
- Miguel Ángel Fernández Ordóñez giving a speech at a conference hosted by Positive Money Europe in Brussels (May 23, 2018)

68th Governor of the Bank of Spain
- In office 8 March 2006 – 11 June 2012
- President: José Luis Rodríguez Zapatero; Mariano Rajoy
- Preceded by: Jaime Caruana
- Succeeded by: Luis María Linde

Personal details
- Born: 3 April 1945 (age 81) Madrid, Spain
- Party: PSOE
- Relations: Francisco Fernández Ordóñez (brother)
- Education: Complutense University of Madrid
- Occupation: Economist

Miguel Ángel Fernández Ordóñez (born 3 April 1945) is a Spanish economist and politician, member of the Socialist Workers' Party and former Governor of the Bank of Spain. He is the younger brother of Francisco Fernández Ordóñez, also a Socialist politician, and he is married to Inés Alberdi.

== Early life and education ==
Fernández Ordóñez was born in Madrid in 1945, he graduated in Law and Economic Science in the Complutense University of Madrid. He belongs to the Cuerpo de Técnicos Comerciales and State Economists.

== Career ==
Fernández Ordóñez served as secretary of State for the Economy, secretary of State for Commerce and Executive director of the International Monetary Fund. In 1992 he was appointed president of the Court of Defense of the Competition. Between 1995 and 1999 he was president of the Commission of the National Electric System. Between 2004 and March 2006 he was Secretary of State for Finance. On 10 March he was appointed Counsellor of the Bank of Spain and member of its Executive Commission.

=== Bank of Spain, 2006–2012 ===
Cadena SER announced that Fernández Ordóñez would succeed Jaime Caruana as Governor of the Bank of Spain in July 2006 when Caruana finished his term. Minister of Economy and Finance Pedro Solbes confirmed this decision on 21 June 2006.

In response to the Spanish property bubble, Fernández Ordoñez sounded the alarm in 2006, pleading with banks and mortgage lenders to rein in loans as the building bubble appeared ready to burst after house prices had risen by 150% in a decade. By 2008, he ordered a closer watch on the cashflow of banks.

In May 2012, Fernández Ordoñez announced that he would step down on June 10, a month before the end of his six-year term, after government officials blamed him for the central bank’s failure to identify and warn earlier about the problems at Bankia and other troubled institutions. Before the end of his term, he sought to defend his legacy before parliament, but the ruling party blocked his request. On 12 June 2012 he was replaced by Luis María Linde as governor of the Bank of Spain.

=== Later career ===
In 2017, Spain’s top court charged Fernández Ordoñez for failing to stop Bankia from being listed on the stock exchange. He was later absolved of possible criminal acts in the case.

== Other activities ==
- European Central Bank (ECB), Ex-Officio Member of the Governing Council (2006–2012)

== Political positions ==
In 2018, Fernández Ordóñez came out in favour of a radical reform of the banking and monetary system. In several speeches and opinion pieces in Spanish media, he advocated for the introduction of a central bank digital currency in the Eurozone, a scheme under which citizens could have a current account directly at the central bank. Fernandez-Ordoñez thinks such system would make the financial system more stable and – paradoxically – less regulated (eg. it would make deposit guarantee schemes unnecessary):

digital money deposited in Central Banks does not need any protection from the State since their deposits are not “promises” to return money, rather they are simply money. Therefore, at no time would citizens run the risk of not being able to withdraw or transfer money from their deposits. The banking crises could no longer occur, with which citizens would stop suffering and paying the cost of these crises.

== Sources ==
- Note on the announcement of the appointment as Governor of the Bank of Spain
- In Spanish
