= Pablo Hernández de Cos =

Spanish economist and banker, born 1971

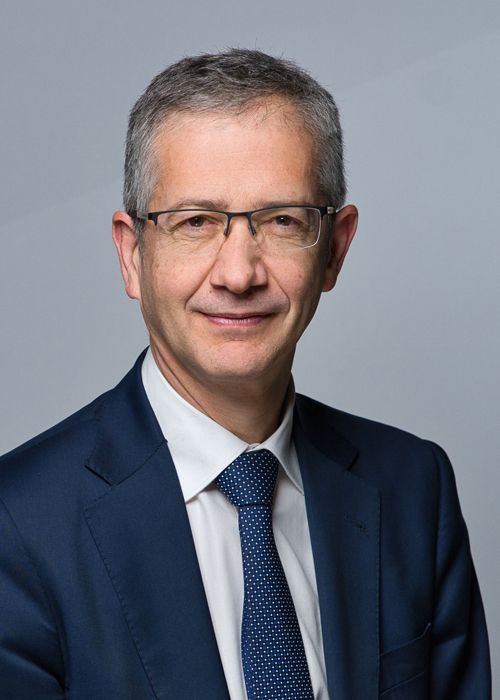

General Manager of the Bank for International Settlements
- Incumbent
- Assumed office 1 July 2025
- Chair: François Villeroy de Galhau; Fabio Panetta
- Preceded by: Agustín Carstens

70th Governor of the Bank of Spain
- In office 11 June 2018 – 11 June 2024
- Preceded by: Luis María Linde
- Succeeded by: José Luis Escrivá; Margarita Delgado Tejero (acting)

Personal details
- Born: 20 January 1971 (age 55) Madrid, Spain
- Education: CUNEF University (BA); National University of Distance Education (LLB); Complutense University (PhD)

Pablo Hernández de Cos (born 20 January 1971) is a Spanish economist and monetary policymaker who has served as the general manager of the Bank for International Settlements since 1 July 2025. He served as the 70th governor of the Bank of Spain from 2018 to 2024. He also served as chairman of the Basel Committee on Banking Supervision and as chair of the Advisory Technical Committee of the European Systemic Risk Board.

He was a nonresident senior fellow at the Peterson Institute for International Economics from August 2024 to September 2025, and a senior fellow at Bruegel from September 2024 to June 2025. He is also a professor at IESE Business School.

== Early life and education ==
Hernández de Cos graduated in economic and business sciences from the CUNEF University (CUNEF) in 1993, in law from the National University of Distance Education the following year and obtained his PhD in economics from the Complutense University of Madrid in 2004, whose thesis was directed by José Manuel González-Páramo. In 2009 he completed a management programme at the IESE Business School of the University of Navarra. He has been an associate lecturer at the Economics Department of Charles III University of Madrid and the IE Business School (IE).

== Career ==
Hernández de Cos joined the Bank of Spain in 1997 as economist of its research service. Between 2004 and 2007 he was advisor to the executive board of the European Central Bank. From 2015 he held the position of general director of the Directorate General of Economy and Statistics of the organization after the resignation of Luis Malo de Molina who had held the position since 1992.

On 28 May 2018, Hernández de Cos was proposed by the Spanish government for the position of governor of the Bank of Spain, and on 30 May was appointed to the position effective 11 June; when he took office before King Felipe VI at a ceremony held at Palace of Zarzuela. His appointment was one of the last decisions of the Second Cabinet of Mariano Rajoy before the vote of no confidence that was successful and resulted in the downfall of Rajoy's government.

The press has highlighted the technical nature of Hernández de Cos' profile, with no political past. The Ministry of Economy, following the announcement of his appointment, stressed that "he is an excellent candidate for the post of governor due to his great technical training, particularly in banking and monetary matters; his political independence; and his experience and prestige in the Bank of Spain and the European Central Bank." Unidos Podemos has described him as "a hawk, but with an impeccable technical profile and, at least, he knows economics." Hernández de Cos himself has publicly advocated for giving the Parliament a greater role in the appointment of central bank chiefs and extending future governorship terms to eight years from six. Hernández de Cos was the second youngest governor since Spain's transition to democracy after José Ramón Álvarez Rendueles, who was appointed governor in 1978, at the age of 37.

In March 2019, Hernández de Cos succeeded Stefan Ingves as chairman of the Basel Committee on Banking Supervision (BCBS) for a three-year term that can be renewed once. In July 2019, he was appointed Chair of the Advisory Technical Committee of the European Systemic Risk Board.

Hernández de Cos' six-year term ended on 11 June 2024, automatically leaving office and being replaced by the deputy governor, Margarita Delgado Tejero, until the appointment of a new incumbent.

In 2024, he joined the faculty of IESE Business School as Professor of the Practice of Management.

On 11 November 2024, the Bank for International Settlements (BIS) announced that Hernández de Cos would succeed Agustín Carstens as its general manager for a five-year term beginning on 1 July 2025. He assumed the role on that date.

In 2026, following the announcement by ECB President Christine Lagarde that she would be stepping down from her position early, his name began to appear in the European press as one of the most likely candidates to succeed her, alongside the Dutch economist Klaas Knot. At the same time, he received public support from Spain’s main political parties, the PP and the PSOE. Ultimately, in November 2026 the Spanish government nominated him as candidate to the ECB Presidency.

== Other activities ==
=== International organizations ===
- Financial Stability Institute (FSI), member of the advisory board (2019–2024)
- European Central Bank (ECB), ex officio member of the governing council (2018–2024)
- European Systemic Risk Board (ESRB), ex officio member (2018–2024)
- Financial Stability Board (FSB), ex officio member (2018–2024)
- International Monetary Fund (IMF), ex officio alternate member of the board of governors (2018–2024)
- Basel Committee on Banking Supervision (BCBS), committee chair (2019–2024).

=== Non-profit organizations ===
- Osservatorio Permanente Giovani-Editori, member of the International Advisory Board (2018–2024)
- Center for Latin American Monetary Studies (CEMLA), member of the board of trustees (2018–2024)
- National Statistics Council of Spain, member (2015–2018)
- Foundation for Applied Economics Studies, member of the board of trustees and executive commission
- Centro de Estudios Monetarios y Financieros (CEMFI), member of the board of trustees (2015–2018)
