= Luis María Linde =

Spanish economist and civil servant

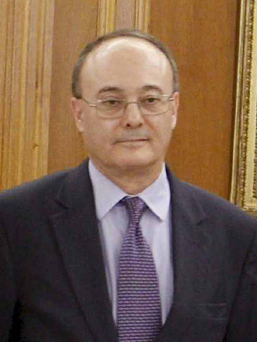

69th Governor of the Bank of Spain
- In office 11 June 2012 – 11 June 2018
- Preceded by: Miguel Ángel Fernández Ordóñez
- Succeeded by: Pablo Hernández de Cos

Personal details
- Born: 15 May 1945 (age 81) Madrid, Spain
- Education: Complutense University

Luis María Linde de Castro (born May 15, 1945 in Madrid) is a Spanish economist and civil servant who served as governor of the Spanish Central Bank from 2012 until 2018.

== Early life and education ==
Linde graduated with a degree in economic sciences from the Universidad Complutense de Madrid with top marks.

== Career ==
Linde was the trade attaché at the Spanish embassy in the Soviet Union and worked for the Ministry of Economy. In 1983, he was appointed to the Banco de España. Between 2005 and 2008 he was executive for Spain in the Inter-American Development Bank.

On May 25, 2012 Linde succeeded Vicente Salas as a member of the governing council of the Banco de España. A few days later Miguel Ángel Fernández Ordóñez resigned as chairman of the bank and Linde was appointed. Another candidate for the post, who was favoured by the European Central Bank (ECB) and financial markets, was José Manuel González Paramo, a former member of the Executive Board of the ECB. Under the bank's statutes Linde will have to retire in three years when he turns 70, and will not therefore be able to complete a six-year term.

Under Linde, who was named only two days before Spain requested a European bailout, the central bank came under fire for its handling of the banking crisis and maintained a neutral stance on economic policy.

Due to the fact that Linde turned 70 halfway through his term of office in May 2015 and the Law of Autonomy of the Bank of Spain established the seventy years of age as a cause for dismissal, the Government decided to remove that section and took the opportunity to eliminate the need for the terms of office of the Governor and Deputy Governor to be simultaneous so that the dismissal of the Governor will not necessarily imply the dismissal of the Deputy Governor.

== Other activities ==
=== International organizations ===
- International Monetary Fund (IMF), Ex-Officio Alternate Member of the Board of Governors, (2012-2018)

=== Non-profit organizations ===
- Fundación pro Real Academia Española, Chairman
- Official Credit Institute (ICO), Member of the Board of Directors
- Princess of Asturias Foundation, Member of the Board of Trustees

=== Corporate boards ===
- Compañía Española de Crédito a la Exportación (CESCE), Adviser to the Board of Directors (2009-2011)
