= Antonio Lara Zárate =

Spanish politician

Deputy for Santa Cruz de Tenerife
- In office 28 June 1931 – 7 January 1936

Deputy for Seville
- In office 16 February 1936 – 2 February 1939

Minister of Finance
- In office 12 September 1933 – 3 March 1934
- Preceded by: Agustín Viñuales
- Succeeded by: Manuel Marraco Ramón

Minister of Justice
- In office 19 February 1936 – 13 May 1936
- Preceded by: Manuel Becerra Fernández
- Succeeded by: Manuel Blasco Garzón

Minister of Public Works
- In office 19 July 1936 – 19 July 1936
- Preceded by: Bernardo Giner de los Ríos
- Succeeded by: Joan Lluhí

Personal details
- Born: 18 December 1881 Santa Cruz de Tenerife, Spain
- Died: 24 February 1956 (aged 74) Mexico City, Mexico
- Occupation: Lawyer, politician

Antonio Lara Zárate (18 December 1881 – 24 February 1956) was a Spanish lawyer and politician. He was a member of the Congress of Deputies throughout the Second Spanish Republic (1931–1939). He served as Minister of Finance (1933–34), Minister of Justice (February–May 1936) and Minister of Public Works (19 July 1936). After the Spanish Civil War (1936–1939) he went into exile in Mexico, where he died.

== Early years (1881–1931) ==
Antonio Lara Zárate was born on 18 December 1881 in Santa Cruz de Tenerife, Canary Islands. His father was an official of the Ministry of War. Lara Záfale attended the Instituto de La Laguna for his secondary education, then when he was 17 moved to the mainland and from 1899 was a free student of Law at the University of Seville. He obtained his law degree in 1905 and returned to the Canary Islands, where he began a successful legal practice as an advocate. He married and had three children. In 1908 Lara opposed the reform of the local administration proposed by Antonio Maura, head of the Conservative Party. He was Secretary of the newly-formed Tenerife Island Council from 1913, and from 1920 to 1922 was Dean of the Santa Cruz de Tenerife Bar Association. In the 1920s he became one of the leaders of the Republican Party of Tenerife.

== Second Spanish Republic (1931–1939) ==
Lara was personally linked to Alejandro Lerroux, who became head of government on 14 April 1931. On 28 June 1931 he was elected deputy for Santa Cruz de Tenerife, holding office until 9 October 1933. Soon after he became a member of the national executive committee of the Radical Republican Party. He was very active in debates. He was a member of the committees of Agriculture, Navy and Budget. In 1932 he was appointed second vice president of the Cortes. He was vice-president of the commission that drafted the opinion of the proposed Statute of Catalonia. He was a member of the committee that investigated the Casas Viejas incident in January 1933.

Lara was Minister of Finance in the cabinets of Alejandro Lerroux (12 September – 8 October 1933) and Diego Martínez Barrio (8 October – 16 December 1933). He was reelected deputy for Santa Cruz de Tenerife on 19 November 1933. He continued as finance minister in the second Lerroux government from 16 December 1933 until 3 March 1934, when he was replaced by Manuel Marraco in a cabinet shuffle.

Lara was aligned with Martínez Barrio in opposing collaboration in parliament with the Catholic right confederation of Gil Robles. In the spring of 1934 he broke with Lerroux and became president of the organizing committee of the Republican Radical Democrat Party (Partido Republicano Radical-Demócrata: PRRD), and soon after of the new Republican Union (Unión Republicana: UR) led by Martinez Barrio. Lara was elected deputy for Seville on 16 February 1936. He was Minister of Justice in the cabinets of Manuel Azaña (19 February – 10 May 1936) and Augusto Barcía Trelles (10–13 May 1936). He was named Minister of Public Works by Martínez Barrio in the ephemeral government of 19 July 1936.

During the Spanish Civil War (1936–1939) Lara attended some of the sessions of the Cortes, but lived in Barcelona and Paris, where he was an attaché in the Spanish Embassy. Azaña's memoirs record a long meeting with Lara, who had just arrived from Paris, in August 1937. He said the internal struggles among the Republicans had been fatal to their image abroad, and said, "It is useless for the President of the Republic to speak of democracy and liberalism if at the same time the films our propaganda shows in theaters always come with the portraits of Lenin and Stalin."

== Exile (1939–1956) ==
In 1939 Lara moved to Great Britain, and in September 1940 managed to travel on the steamer Orduña from Liverpool to Veracruz, Mexico. It was only years later that he was reunited with his first son Cristóbal, and much later with his son Juan. (Note: Another source says his son Cristóbal trabeled with him to Veracruz in September 1940.) His two daughters and his wife remained in Santa Cruz de Tenerife. In Mexico he worked as a lawyer in the law firm of Felipe Sánchez-Román, and was an adviser to Mexican President Manuel Ávila Camacho. Vicente Llorens^{(es)} in his book La emigración republicana says that Lara also had his own office in Mexico city. He remained a member of the Republican Union and of the government in exile, and was involved in intense political activity with Martinez Barrio. He died on 24 February 1956 in Mexico.

== Publications ==
From 1941 to 1948 Lara composed a considerable number of poems about his feelings and meditations as an exile from his country.

- Antonio Lara y Zarate (1988), Musica de islas: [poemas del exilio] (Poetry) (in Spanish), Confederacion de Cajas de Ahorros, p. 180, ISBN 978-8450583564

== Sources ==
- LARA ZARATE, ANTONIO Elecciones 28.6.1931 (in Spanish), Congreso de los Diputados
- LARA ZARATE, ANTONIO Relación de elecciones en las que fue diputado (in Spanish), Congreso de los Diputados
- Martinón Cejas, Miguel (1999-12-01), "Antonio Lara, Poeta en el Exilio", Espejo de aire: Voces y visiones literarias. Ensayos sobre literatura moderna y contemporánea (in Spanish), Editorial Verbum, ISBN 978-84-7962-159-9
- Rey, Leandro Álvarez (2009), "Lara Zarate, Antonio de", Los diputados por Andalucía de la II República (1931-1939). Diccionario Biográfico (in Spanish), Centro de Estudios Andaluces, ISBN 978-84-937855-0-5
