= Manuel Marraco Ramón =

Spanish businessman and politician

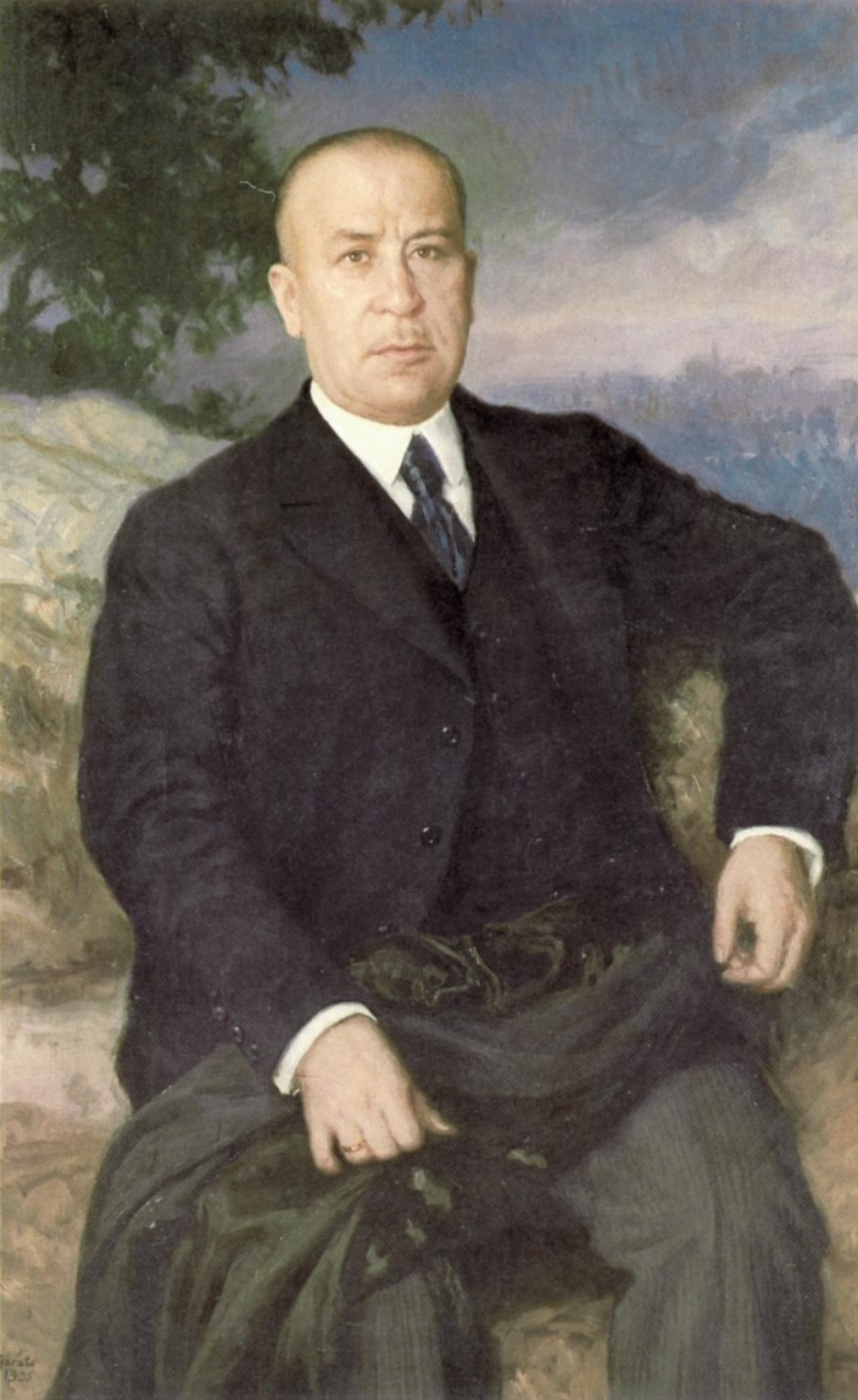
- Portrait by Juan José Gárate

Deputy for Zaragoza
- In office 1 March 1918 – 2 May 1919

Deputy for Zaragoza
- In office 3 July 1931 – 9 October 1933

Governor of the Bank of Spain
- In office September 1933 – March 1934
- Preceded by: Julio Carabias Salcedo
- Succeeded by: Alfredo de Zavala y Lafora

Minister of Finance
- In office 3 March 1934 – 3 April 1935
- Preceded by: Antonio Lara Zárate
- Succeeded by: Alfredo de Zavala y Lafora

Minister of Industry and Commerce
- In office 3 April 1935 – 6 May 1935
- Preceded by: Andres Orozco Batista
- Succeeded by: Rafael Aizpún Santafé

Minister of Public Works
- In office 6 May 1935 – 25 September 1935
- Preceded by: Rafael Guerra del Río
- Succeeded by: Luis Lucia Lucia

Personal details
- Born: 16 June 1870 Zaragoza, Aragon, Spain
- Died: 29 September 1956 (aged 86) Zaragoza, Aragon, Spain
- Occupation: Businessman, politician

Manuel Marraco Ramón (16 June 1870 – 29 September 1956) was a Spanish businessman and politician. He was a deputy for Zaragoza in 1918–19) during the Spanish Restoration, and was again deputy for Zaragoza from 1931 to 1933 during the Second Spanish Republic. He was Governor of the Bank of Spain in 1933–34. Between 1934 and 1935 he was in turn Minister of Finance, Minister of Industry and Commerce, and Minister of Public Works.

== Career ==
Manuel Marraco Ramón was born on 16 June 1870 in Zaragoza. He attended the Escuelas Pías for his secondary education, then obtained a degree in Law from the University of Zaragoza. He obtained his Doctorate in Law in Madrid.

After leaving school he and his brother Mariano, while expecting to emigrate to Canada, put their energy into the family businesses. For many years Marraco was manager of the Azucarera Agrícola del Pilar, part of the sugar beet industry at a period of growth in Aragon. In 1914 he became vice-president of the Official Zaragoza Chamber of Commerce and Industry, and he was also linked to management of the Mutualidad Mercantil, S.A. In the 1930 he became president of the Alcoholera Agrícola del Pilar while his son replaced him as manager. The company was closely associated with the Asociación de Labradores de Zaragoza, in which Marraco also played a management role.

== Early political involvement ==
Marraco had republican views from an early age. In June 1914 he was one of the fourteen signatories to the "Manifesto of the Republicans of Aragon", which in October 1914 led to the constitution of the Autonomous Republican Party of Aragon (Partido Republicano Autónomo de Aragón). He was elected deputy for Zaragoza as a Republican on 24 February 1918 and held office until 2 May 1919. In November 1918 he joined the leadership of Alejandro Lerroux's new Republican Federation (Federación Republicana).

Marracó was sympathetic to Catalan demands for independence. On 15 September 1918 in a speech at the Teatro Goya^{(es)} in Barcelona Marraco said, "I am not afraid of the independence of Catalonia, because in it I also see that of Aragon and the other regions that would join in a future bond to form the great Iberia, respecting each other's characters and achieving a real enlargement." In November 1920 he participated in the Congress of Republican Democracy in Madrid, organized by Lerroux.

== Second Spanish Republic ==
Marraco was elected deputy for Zaragoza as a Radical Republican on 26 June 1931, holding office until 9 October 1933. He was vice-president of the Constituent Cortes. He was president of the Zaragoza Provincial Committee of the Radical Republican Party, and leading member of the Aragon Regional Committee of the party, created in 1933. In 1931 he was appointed director of the Local Credit Bank of Spain. He actively opposed the Statute of Autonomy of Catalonia of 1932. In September 1933 he was appointed governor of the Bank of Spain in place of Julio Carabias Salcedo. He held office until 3 March 1934.

Marraco believed in regionalism based on river basins as a geographical unit. In 1934 he managed to get the Ebro River Hydrographic Confederation restored, covering a wider area than traditional Aragon, but it was dissolved during a crisis in 1935. He believed in Georgism as popularized in Spain by the engineer Antonio Albendin, the promoter of the Spanish League for a Single Tax. This philosophy held that people should own the value they produce themselves, but the value of natural resources should be shared among all members of society.

Marraco was Minister of Finance from 3 March 1934 to 3 April 1935. He was appointed by Alejandro Lerroux after the radical Antonio Lara had resigned from the Finance Ministry. Both Lara and Marraco complied with requests from Lerroux to treat the businessman Horacio Echevarrieta favorably in his dealings with the state. Ricardo Samper replaced Lerroux as prime minister on 28 April 1934, and headed the government until October 1934. His government had to deal with growing workers unrest in the large cities and on among land-workers, and a challenge to central authority in the Generalitat de Catalunya. Marraco approved a new statute on wines and banned collection of local taxes or duties on import, distribution, inspection and consumption of Spanish wines. These measures drew protests from Basque town and city councils since they seemed inconsistent with the Concierto Económico, which defined historic taxation rights in Basque country.

Marraco was Minister of Industry and Commerce from 3 April 1935 to 6 May 1935. He was appointed to this position by Lerroux, who had formed a government that included radicals and independents, and that was not expected to last long. The cabinet was reshuffled the next month. Marraco was Minister of Public Works from 6 May 1935 to 25 September 1935.

== Last years ==
Marraco died on 29 September, 1956 in Zaragoza.

== Publications ==
- Andrés Giménez Soler; Manuel Marraco (1915), El pensamiento económico aragonés, Zaragoza: Tip. Ediciones Aragonesas, p. 45
- Andrés Giménez Soler (1916), Estudios de Historia aragonesa. Siglos XVI y XVII, Preface by Manuel Marraco
- Alberto Ballarín Marcial; Manuel Marraco (1969), Aragón : discursos sobre su espíritu y su economía, Madrid: Industrias Gráficas Margerit

== Sources ==
- Arbeloa, Victor Manuel (2015-09-18), El quiebro del PSOE (1933-1934) Tomo 2: Del gobierno a la revolución (in Spanish), ACCI (Asoc. Cultural y Científica Iberoameric.), ISBN 978-84-15705-65-9
- Broto Aparicio, Santiago (22 May 2016), "Los Marraco, noble estirpe de la comarca jaquesa", Diario del AltoAragón (in Spanish)
- Casanova, Julián (2010-07-29), The Spanish Republic and Civil War, Cambridge University Press, ISBN 978-1-139-49057-3
- Fundación Gaspar Torrente (27 September 2012), Manuel Marraco: la independencia de Cataluña (in Spanish)
- García Delgado, José Luis (2000), Del real al euro: una historia de la peseta (in Spanish), "la Caixa", ISBN 978-84-88099-61-7
- Marraco Ramón, Manuel Elecciones 24.2.1918 (in Spanish), Congreso de los Diputados
- Marraco Ramón, Manuel Elecciones 28.6.1931 (in Spanish), Congreso de los Diputados
- "Marraco Ramón, Manuel", GEA: Gran Enciclopedia Aragonesa (in Spanish), DiCom Medios SL
- Moreno Luzón, Javier (2006), "De agravios, pactos y símbolos. El nacionalismo español ante la autonomía de Cataluña (1918-1919)", Ayer (63, La crisis del régimen liberal en España, 1917–1923), Asociacion de Historia Contemporanea and Marcial Pons Ediciones de Historia, JSTOR 41325014
- Díaz Morlán, Pablo (2000), "Un ejemplo de clientelismo empresarial: La influencia política del industrial Horacio Echevarrieta", Historia Social (in Spanish) (36, Clientelas, Caciquismo y Poder en la Restauración), Fundacion Instituto de Historia Social, JSTOR 40340825
- Ramos Gorostiza, José Luis; Pires Jiménez, Luis Eduardo (2007), "Julio Senador And The Spreading Of Georgism In Spain: Towards The Single Tax Using Regenerationist Rhetoric", History of Economic Ideas, 15 (3), Accademia Editoriale, JSTOR 23723288
- Rosenberg, S. L. Millard (May 1934), "Political News from Spain", Hispania, 17 (2), American Association of Teachers of Spanish and Portuguese, JSTOR 332579
- Tuñón de Lara, Manuel (2000-06-28), La España del siglo XX (3 volúmenes) (in Spanish), Ediciones AKAL, ISBN 978-84-460-1105-7
