= Jaime Caruana =

Spanish economist

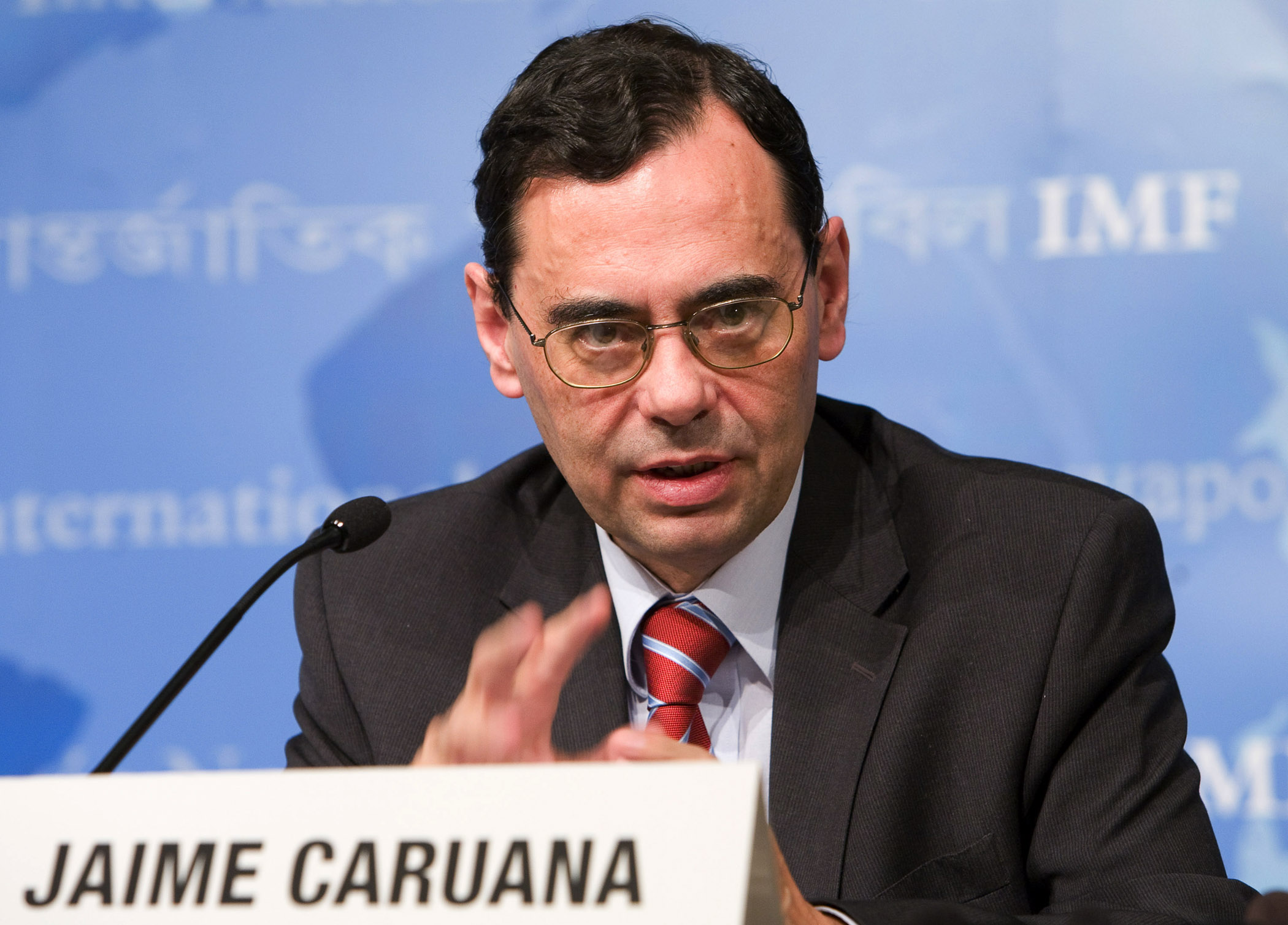

General Manager of the Bank for International Settlements
- In office 1 April 2009 – 30 November 2017
- Preceded by: Malcolm Knight
- Succeeded by: Agustín Carstens

67th Governor of the Bank of Spain
- In office 21 July 2000 – 12 July 2006
- Preceded by: Luis Ángel Rojo Duque
- Succeeded by: Miguel Ángel Fernández Ordóñez

Personal details
- Born: 14 March 1952 (age 74) Valencia, Spain
- Education: Technical University of Madrid

Jaime Caruana (born 14 March 1952) is a Spanish economist. He served as the General Manager of the Bank for International Settlements from 1 April 2009 to 30 November 2017. He was also the Governor of the Bank of Spain from July 2000 to July 2006.

== Early life and education ==
Caruana was born in Valencia, and graduated in telecommunications engineering from the Technical University of Madrid (UPM) in 1974.

== Career ==
Caruana served a six-year term as Bank of Spain Governor, beginning 21 July 2000 and ending on 12 July 2006.

In this capacity, Caruana was also chairman of the Basel Committee on Banking Supervision since May, 2003. Caruana took over the Basel II project at a difficult time, and won respect and praise from both regulators and the financial services industry for ultimately delivering the revised accord in June 2004. In August 2006, Jaime Caruana was appointed to the International Monetary Fund (IMF) by Rodrigo de Rato, as counsellor and director of the Monetary and Capital Markets Department, a new financial, capital and regulatory department. He was succeeded at the Bank of Spain by former secretary of State for Commerce, Miguel Ángel Fernández Ordóñez.

Caruana took over as BIS general manager in April 2009. After completing five years in office in 2014, his term was extended by another three years.

== Other activities ==
- Banco Bilbao Vizcaya Argentaria, Member of the Board of Directors (since 2018)
- Group of Thirty, Member
