= Felipe Sánchez Román =

Spanish lawyer and politician

Felipe Sánchez Román

Felipe Sánchez Roman (1850 in Valladolid, Spain – 1916 in Madrid, Spain) was a Spanish lawyer and politician, Minister of State in 1905, during the reign of Alfonso XIII. Professor of Civil Law in the University of Granada, Sánchez Román represented the late in the Spanish Senate from 1893 to 1902.

He was the father of the jurist Felipe Sánchez Román y Gallifa.

== Sources ==
- Personal dossier of D. Felipe Sánchez Román. Spanish Senate
