= Agustín Viñuales =

Spanish politician

Agustín Viñuales Pardo
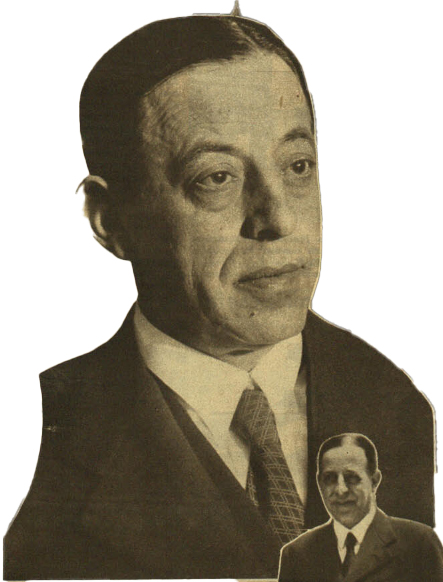

Minister of Finance
- In office 12 June 1933 – 12 September 1933
- Preceded by: Jaime Carner
- Succeeded by: Antonio Lara Zárate

Personal details
- Born: 7 August 1881 Huesca, Spain
- Died: 14 November 1959 (aged 78) Madrid, Spain
- Occupation: Lawyer, economist, politician

Agustín Viñuales Pardo (7 August 1881 – 14 November 1959) was a Spanish lawyer, economist and politician who was briefly Minister of Finance in 1933.

== Birth and education ==
Agustín Viñuales Pardo was born in Huesca on 7 August 1881. His father was a well-known merchant who was active in politics as a member of the Liberal Dynastic party. His uncle, Urbez Viñuales, was also prominent in business and politics. He obtained his secondary education in Huesca and his law degree from the University of Madrid. He was a disciple of the economist Antonio Flores de Lemus and specialized in Political Economy and Public Finance. After completing his doctorate he studied political economics in France and in several German universities.

== Career ==
Viñuales won a competition for a position in the Secretariat of the Madrid Chamber of Commerce. In 1918 he was appointed to the chair of Political Economy of the Faculty of Law of the University of Granada. During the dictatorship of 1923–31 he gave the government advice on the gold standard. He travelled in America, where he met leaders in international economics and politics.

Viñuales became a militant in the Republican Action party. After the Second Spanish Republic was proclaimed Viñuales helped Felipe Sánchez Román y Gallifa and Flores de Lemus to draw up the plans for agrarian reform. However, the government rejected these plans due to opposition from Niceto Alcalá-Zamora and Miguel Maura. He generally avoided public life, and only reluctantly accepted the position of Director General of the Mint. In January 1933 he was appointed to the chair of Public Finance at the Central University of Madrid. He was Director General of the Mint. On 12 June 1933 at the request of Indalecio Prieto he served as Minister of Finance, holding office until September 1933. After leaving the ministry Viñuales married Erika Graa. On 2 March 1936 he was designated Counseller representing the State in the Bank of Spain, a post he held until September, when he went abroad and did not return.

During the Spanish Civil War (1936–39) he spent most of his time in France. The government of Francisco Franco removed him from his professorship by decree on 29 July 1939 for his activities under the Second Spanish Republic. On 4 April 1944 he was sanctioned with three years of disqualification and 1,000 points for having been a representative of the government in the Bank of Spain and for having fled abroad. He remained in Biarritz until 1948, when he returned to Spain. He then resumed his chair at the university. On 8 November 1957 he was granted a full pardon. He retired from the university in 1958. Viñuales died in Madrid on 14 November 1959 of an attack of hemiplegia.

== Publications ==
- Enrique Ferri, La justicia penal su evolución, sus defectos, su porvenir, Translated by Agustín Viñuales, Madrid: B. Rodríguez, p. 137

== Sources ==
- Balaguer, Federico (1959), "Agustín Viñuales Pardo", Argensola (in Spanish) (40), Huesca: Instituto de Estudios Altoaragoneses, ISSN 2445-0561
- Baso Andreu, Antonio (1990), "Agustín Viñuales Pardo y Federico García Lorca, Recuerdo de su Amistad Granadina" (PDF), Argensola: Revista de Ciencias Sociales del Instituto de Estudios Altoaragoneses (in Spanish) (104), ISSN 0518-4088
- Dennis, Nigel (1986-01-01), José Bergamín: A Critical Introduction, 1920-1936, University of Toronto Press, Scholarly Publishing Division, ISBN 978-1-4875-9651-4
- Escalafón de antigüedad de los catedráticos numerarios de las Universidades del Reino. 1928 (in Spanish), Ministerio de Educación, 1928, GGKEY:GTWC39UGTB1
- Otero Carvajal, Luis E. (2006), La destrucción de la ciencia en España: depuración universitaria en el franquismo (in Spanish), Editorial Complutense, ISBN 978-84-7491-808-3
- "Viñuales Pardo, Agustín", GEA: Gran Enciclopedia Aragonesa (in Spanish), DiCom Medios SL, archived from the original on 2016-03-03
