= Jaime Carner =

Spanish politician

Jaime Carner Romeu
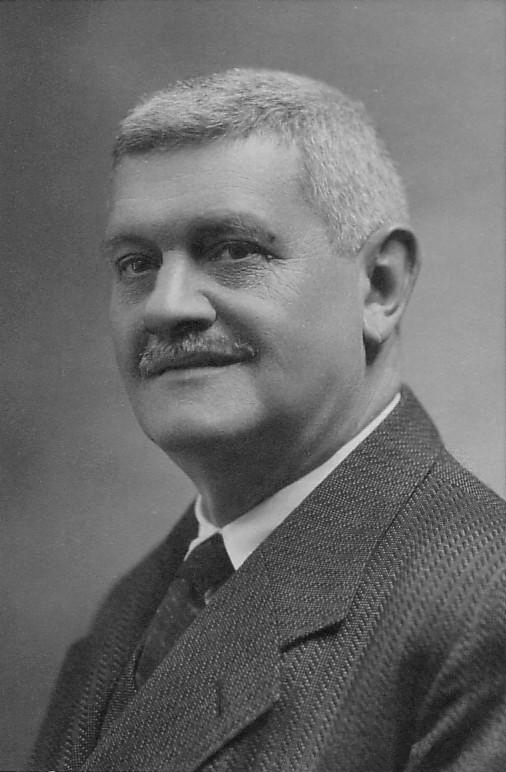
- Sketch of Carner by Ramon Casas

Cortes Deputy for Vendrell
- In office 1907–1916

Cortes Deputy for Tarragona
- In office 1931–1933

Minister of Finance
- In office 16 December 1931 – 12 June 1933
- Preceded by: Indalecio Prieto
- Succeeded by: Agustín Viñuales Pardo

Personal details
- Born: 22 February 1867 El Vendrell, Tarragona, Catalonia, Spain
- Died: 26 September 1934 (aged 67) Barcelona, Catalonia, Spain
- Occupation: Lawyer, businessman, politician

Jaime Carner Romeu (Catalan: Jaume Carner i Romeu, 22 February 1867 – 26 September 1934) was a Spanish lawyer, businessman and politician from Catalonia. He was a deputy in the Cortes (Spanish parliament) before World War I, then pursued a career as a corporate lawyer until the Second Spanish Republic when he was again elected deputy. He was Minister of Finance from 1931 to 1933.

== Birth and education (1867–99) ==
Jaime Carner Romeu was born in El Vendrell, Tarragona, Catalonia, Spain, on 22 February 1867. His parents were Joan Carner, a veterinarian, and Josefa Romeu. He attended the Escuelas Pías de Barcelona for his secondary education between 1876 and 1882. He studied law at the University of Barcelona from 1882 to 1883 and from 1885 to 1886. He then started work as a lawyer in the office of Francesc de Paula Rius i Taulet, the mayor of Barcelona.

== Bourbon Restoration politics (1899–1916) ==
Carner joined the Catalan movement, and when the Catalan National Center^{(ca)} was formed in 1899 he was vice-president under Narcís Verdaguer i Callís^{(ca)} as president. When the Catalan National Center merged with the Regionalist Union to form the Regionalist League of Catalonia in 1901 he was one of the leaders of the Republican left wing of this party. He was one of the main organizers of the "four presidents" election in 1901. Carner was rapporteur of a draft reform to the municipal law, approved on 4 March 1902, although it seems to have been written by Enric Prat de la Riba. In 1903 he became a representative in the municipal council of the city of Barcelona. When King Alfonso XIII visited Barcelona in 1904 Carner was one of the councilors who were absent from the ceremony to welcome the king. This group separated from the Regionalist League.

In 1904 Carner was a founder of the weekly El Poble Català^{(ca)}, which became a daily paper in May 1906. He was a founder of the Republican Nationalist Centre party in 1904, and was elected president of the party in late 1906. This party combined with the League in the Solidaritat Catalana coalition, which won 40 of the 44 seats in Catalonia in the 1907 elections. Carner was elected deputy for the district of El Vendrell. Carner was involved in the debate over corruption in the supply of building materials in Barcelona, and initiated a condemnation of the conduct of Alejandro Lerroux and others. In 1910 Carner was one of the founders of the Republican Nationalist Federal Union, which replaced the Nationalist Republican Center. This party formed a coalition with Lerroux's Republicans and was decisively defeated in 1914.

== Lawyer and businessman (1916–31) ==
Carner temporarily left politics and devoted himself to his successful legal practice. He joined the boards of directors of several large industrial companies, was one of the founders of the Compañía de Industrias Agrícolas, and acted as lawyer for various powerful companies and credit institutions in Barcelona. He was a member of the board of Nestlé Spain. He became wealthy, and was also very respected as a jurist, often consulted by political leaders on legal issues.

== Second Spanish Republic (1931–34) ==
After the Second Spanish Republic was proclaimed Carner was elected deputy to the Cortes for the Republican Left of Catalonia (Esquerra Republicana de Catalunya) party. The Generalitat of Catalonia was restored by decree on 21 April 1931. Carner was given charge of the commission to prepare the draft Statute of Autonomy of Catalonia, later called the Statute of Núria, issued on 20 June 1931, approved by referendum on 2 August 1931 and finally approved by the Cortes on 9 September 1932.

After promulgation of the republican constitution Manuel Azaña reorganized the government and appointed Carner as Minister of Finance on 16 December 1931. The moderate Felipe Sánchez Román y Gallifa, who had been considered as a potential candidate for President of the Republic, resigned from the government's legal advisory committee due in part to objections to the appointment of Carner as Minister of Finance. As Minister of Finance Carner spoke on several occasions in debates about the Bank of Spain.

Carner followed his predecessor Indalecio Prieto in making stabilisation of the peseta his first goal in order to restore Spain's access to international credit. His policies were conservative and deflationary, including restrictions on imports, pruning the civil service and working towards balancing the budget. He was even more orthodox than Prieto. The peseta had fallen by 25% between 1929 and 1931, but fell by just over 10% in 1932 and then remained stable until 1936. The peseta was stable by mid-1932, and there were smaller deficits in Carner's 1932 and 1933 budgets than under the dictatorship. He presented a budget in 1932 that proposed reduced defense spending, increased spending on education at all levels, and changes to income tax legislation that resulted in the Law of General Contribution on Income of 20 December 1932. He aimed to improve competition in the Spanish economy, with measures such as reforming tariffs and taxation, changing the tax on royalties and increasing inheritance taxes.

Carner left office on 12 June 1933 when he was diagnosed with advanced cancer of the throat. The need to replace him was used by Azaña to justify a cabinet reshuffle. President Niceto Alcalá-Zamora tried but failed to present this as evidence of a crisis and a reason to dismiss Azaña. Carner was succeeded by Agustín Viñuales Pardo, another Catalan. Carner died on 26 September 1934. His funeral in Barcelona at the end of September was attended by Azaña and many other political leaders, including Left Republicans, Socialists and members of the Generalitat de Catalunya.

== Publications ==
Publications by Carner include:

- Jaime Carner Romeu (1907), Orientacions politiques y socials del Centre Nacionalista Repúblicà, Barcelona
- Jaime Carner Romeu (1919), Els catalans i el comerç modern, Barcelona: Imp. Elzeviriana, p. 200
- Jaime Carner Romeu (1920), Sucesión intestada de los impúberes en Cataluña según la doctrina del Tribunal Supremo, Barcelona
- Jaime Carner Romeu (1984), Alfred Pérez-Bastardes (ed.), La democràcia nacionalista de Catalunya, Barcelona: La Magrana, p. 168, ISBN 84-7410-170-0
- Jaime Carner Romeu (2013), De la crisis a la democracia activa : el fin del capitalismo salvaje, Barcelona: Fundació Banc dels Aliments, p. 387

== Sources ==
- Casanova, Julián (2010-07-29), The Spanish Republic and Civil War, Cambridge University Press, ISBN 978-1-139-49057-3
- Farquet, Christophe (2016-12-20), La défense du paradis fiscal suisse avant la Seconde Guerre mondiale: une histoire internationale (in French), Editions Alphil, ISBN 978-2-88930-141-6
- Gómez Rojo, María Encarnación, "Jaime Carner Romeu ( 1867-1934 )", in Manuel J. Peláez Albendea (ed.), Diccionario crítico de Juristas españoles, portugueses y latinoamericanos [de L. A. Séneca a 2005] (in Spanish)
- Graham, Helen; Preston, Paul (1988-12-05), The Popular Front in Europe, Palgrave Macmillan UK, ISBN 978-1-349-10618-9
- Jackson, Gabriel (2012-05-05), Spanish Republic and the Civil War, 1931-1939, Princeton University Press, ISBN 978-1-4008-2018-4
- Jardí, Enric (1974), Les doctrines jurídiques, polítiques i socials d'Enric Prat de la Riba (in Spanish), Institut d'Estudis Catalans, ISBN 978-84-7283-101-8
- Serrano Migallón, Fernando (2003), Los maestros del exilio español en la Facultad de Derecho (in Spanish), UNAM, ISBN 978-970-07-4334-9
- Thomas, Hugh (2013-03-28), The Spanish Civil War, Penguin Books Limited, ISBN 978-0-7181-9293-8
