= José García Barzanallana =

Spanish lawyer and politician

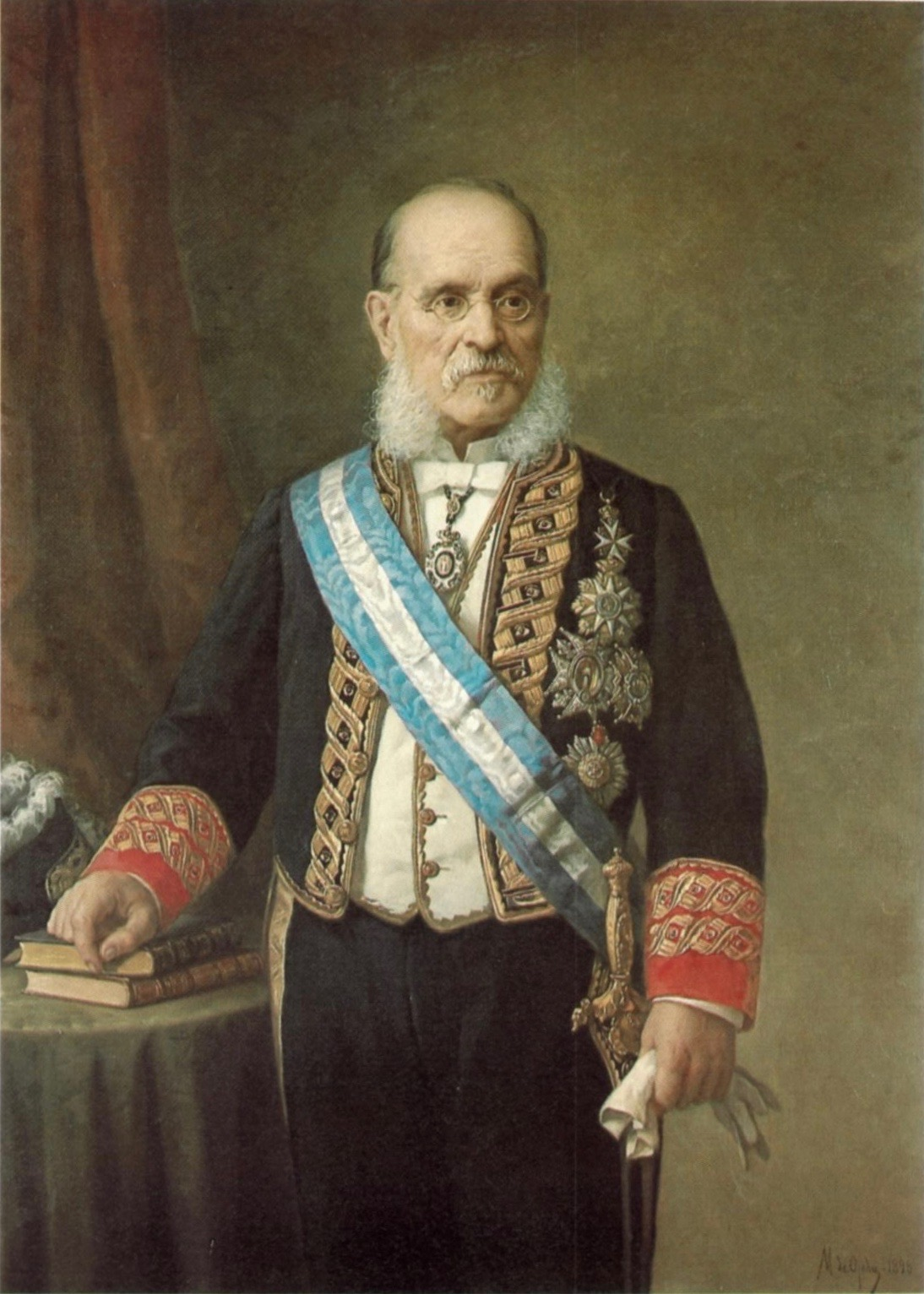
Portrait of Barzanallana

José García Barzanallana (February 24, 1819 - February 21, 1903) was a Spanish lawyer and politician.
