= Joaquín Chapaprieta =

Spanish politician (1871–1951)

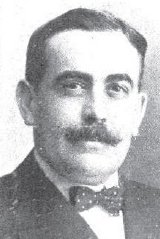
- Photograph by Kaulak

Prime Minister of Spain
- In office 25 September 1935 – 14 December 1935
- President: Niceto Alcala-Zamora
- Preceded by: Alejandro Lerroux
- Succeeded by: Manuel Portela

Minister of the Treasury
- In office 6 May 1935 – 30 December 1935
- Preceded by: Alfredo de Zavala y Lafora
- Succeeded by: Manuel Rico Avelló

Personal details
- Born: 26 October 1871 Torrevieja, Spain
- Died: 15 October 1951 (aged 79) Madrid, Spain
- Occupation: Politician, lawyer

Joaquín Chapaprieta y Torregrosa (26 October 1871 – 15 October 1951) was a Spanish politician. He served as prime minister in 1935, during the Second Republic.

== Biography ==
Born in Torrevieja, province of Alicante, on 26 October 1871, son to a well-off family, his father being a ship operator. His grandfather on his father side was a Genoese who settled in the area in the mid 19th century (the original surname was Schiapeprietti). He finished his secondary education at the diocesan seminary of San Miguel in Orihuela. He earned a licentiate degree in Law from the Central University in Madrid in 1893, later taking PhD courses at the University of Bologna.

Introduced to politics as member of the moretista faction of the Liberal Party, he became a member of the Congress of Deputies in 1901. He became later a Senator, representing the provinces of La Coruña and Valladolid. He served as Minister of Labour from 7 December 1922 to 3 September 1923.

From 6 May 1935 he served as Minister of the Treasury, a position he continued to hold after 23 September when he was appointed President of the Council of Ministers, serving as an independent with support from the Spanish Confederation of the Autonomous Right (CEDA) and the Peasant's Party. His government collapsed after the CEDA vetoed a proposed increase in death duties from 1% to 3.5%. After stepping down on 14 December, he continued to serve as Minister of the Treasury until 30 December, when he resigned. He retired then from politics and focused on his law firm.

He died in Madrid on 15 October 1951.
