= Antonio Flores de Lemus =

Spanish politician and economist

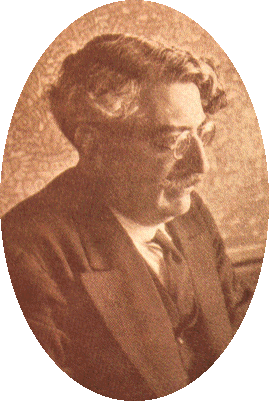

Antonio Flores de Lemus (1876–1941) was a Spanish politician and economist.

== Life ==
Born in Jaén, he majored in Law at the universities of Granada and Oviedo. He was university professor of Political Economy in the universities of Barcelona (1904) and Madrid (1920), besides holding numerous positions for the Ministry of Property. He was involved in studies of the Spanish economy as an economist, and published diverse works about agriculture and the running of the economy.

== Published works ==
- La reforma arancelaria, consideraciones y materiales (1905)
- Sobre una dirección fundamental de la producción rural española (1926)
- Sobre el problema económico de España (1928)
- Dictamen de la Comisión para el Estudio de la Implantación del Patrón Oro (1929)
