= Red Terror (Spain) =

Assassinations during the Spanish Civil War

Red Terror Terror Rojo (Spanish)
- Part of Spanish Civil War, Interwar period
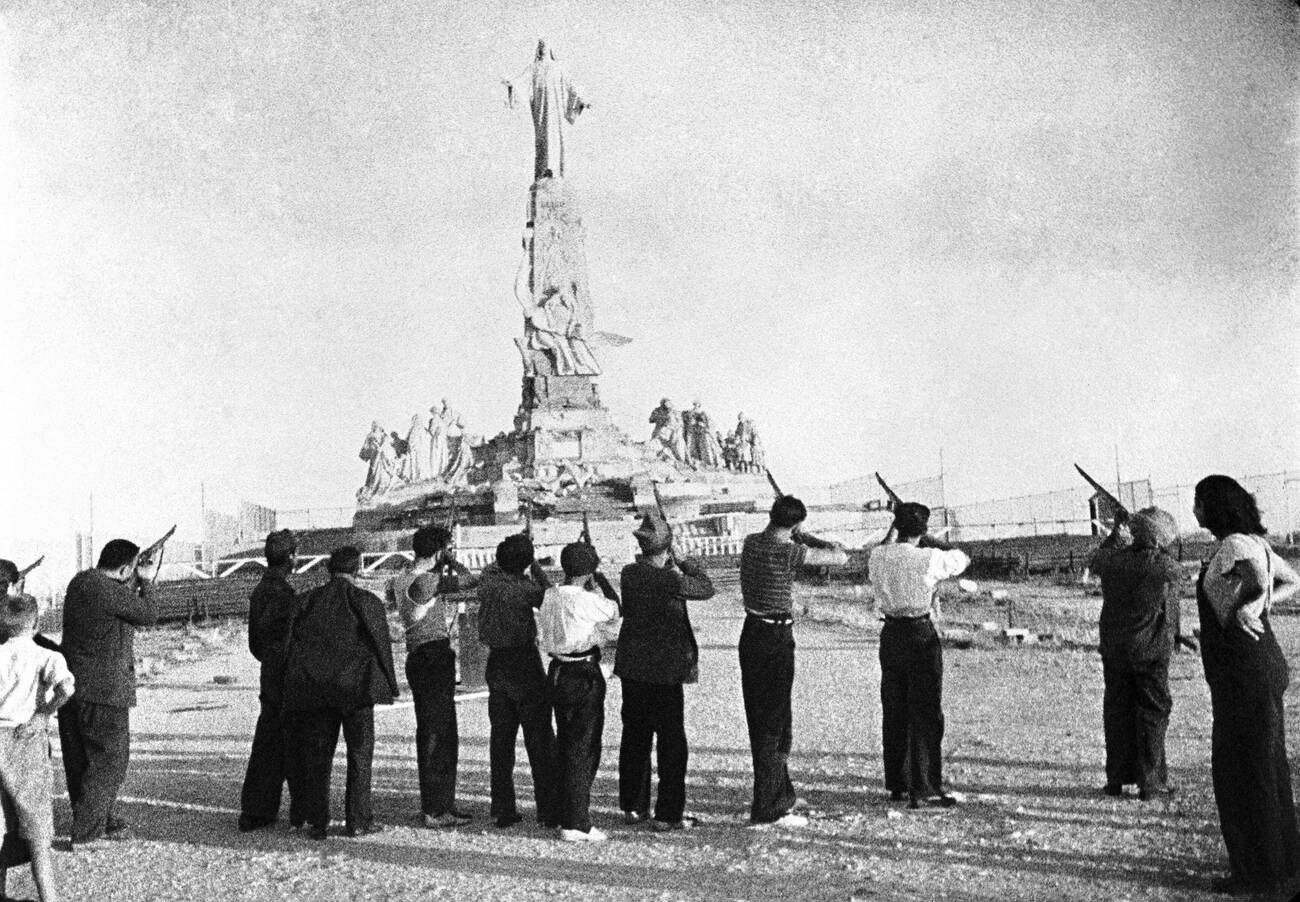
- "Execution" of the Sacred Heart by a communist firing squad is an example of "an assault on the public presence of Catholicism". The image was originally published in the London Daily Mail with a caption noting the "Spanish Reds' war on religion".
- Location: Second Spanish Republic
- Date: 1936–1939
- Target: Catholics, Spanish nobility, rightists, business owners, conservatives, and political dissidents within the Republican faction
- Attack type: Anticlerical violence, politicide, antireligious violence, political repression, political violence, mass murder, sectarian violence, terrorism, political purge
- Deaths: 38,000 to 110,965
- Perpetrators: Republican faction and Soviet Union
- Motive: Anti-Catholic sentiment, enforcing communist or anarchist ideals, anti-fascism, anti-monarchism, Stalinism, consolidation of power within the Republican faction

Red Terror (Spanish: Terror Rojo) is the name given by historians to various acts of violence committed from 1936 until the end of the Spanish Civil War by leftist groups. The May 1931 arson attacks against Church property throughout Spain and the determination of the Republican Government to never compromise upon and strictly enforce its ban against classical Catholic education were the beginning of a politicidal campaign of religious persecution against the Catholic Church in Spain. No Republican-controlled region escaped systematic and anticlerical violence, although it was minimal in the Basque Country. The violence consisted of the killing of tens of thousands of people, including 6,832 Roman Catholic priests, the vast majority in the wake of the rightist military coup in July 1936, the Spanish nobility, small business owners, industrialists, conservative politicians, and known or suspected supporters of the right-leaning parties or the anti-Stalinist Left, and the desecration and arson attacks against monasteries, convents, Catholic schools, and churches.

A process of political polarisation had already characterized the Second Spanish Republic; party divisions became increasingly embittered, and whether an individual continued practising Catholicism was seen as a sign of partisan loyalty. Electorally, the Church had identified itself with the conservative parties, which had set themselves against the far-left.

While the violence long preceded the failed coup of July 1936, the immediate aftermath let loose a violent onslaught on everyone that the revolutionaries in the Republican zone identified as enemies; "where the rebellion failed, for several months afterwards, merely to be identified as a priest, a religious, or simply a militant Christian or member of some apostolic or pious organization, was enough for a person to be executed without trial." Some estimates of the Red Terror range from 38,000 to 110,965 people killed.

Historian Julio de la Cueva wrote that "despite the fact that the Church... suffer[ed] appalling persecution," the events have so far met not only with "the embarrassing partiality of ecclesiastical scholars, but also with the embarrassed silence or attempts at justification of a large number of historians and memoirists." Analysts such as Helen Graham have linked the Red and White Terrors, alleging that it was the failed rightist coup that allowed the culture of brutal violence to flourish: "its original act of violence was that it killed off the possibility of other forms of peaceful political evolution." Other historians allege that they have found evidence of systematic religious persecution and revolutionary terror long preceding the military uprising and have pointed to a "radical and antidemocratic" opposition to religious toleration among supporters of the Second Spanish Republic and even within its constitution. These attitudes and policies attracted harsh criticism at the time, even from fellow Republicans Miguel de Unamuno and José Ortega y Gasset, and ultimately from Pope Pius XI in the encyclical Dilectissima Nobis.

According to historian Julius Ruiz, the Red Terror also included politicidal infighting within the Republican faction, particularly after the Stalinist Communist Party of Spain declared POUM, the Workers' Party of Marxist Unification (an anti-Stalinist Left and Trotskyist political party), to be an illegal organization, alongside all other real and suspected Trotskyists and anarchists. The Stalinists, aided by the Comintern, the NKVD, and the GRU, accordingly unleashed a revolutionary terror almost identical to the simultaneous Purge of 1937 in the Soviet Union against the International Brigades and all other Republican factions, including en masse arrests, interrogation under torture, and mass executions. The Stalinist Red Terror against fellow Republicans and the decision to immediately transform Spain into a prototype for "the people's democracies" of the Cold War-era Soviet Bloc instead of first defeating Francisco Franco were nothing short of catastrophic for the Republican faction.

George Orwell, an English socialist who fought during the Spanish Civil War as part of the POUM, would describe the Soviet-decreed Purge of the Republican faction in his memoirs Homage to Catalonia, as well as writing Nineteen Eighty-Four and Animal Farm to make the case that both fascism and Stalinism are two sides of the same coin. Other formerly pro-Soviet Westerners who witnessed the Purges, including John Dos Passos and Arthur Koestler, were left similarly disillusioned.

In recent years, the Holy See has beatified hundreds of the victims of the Red Terror (498 in one 2007 ceremony, the largest single number of beatifications in the Catholic Church's history).

== Background ==
According to historian Ronald Radosh, "The Spanish Civil War was the culmination of long-standing tensions and social strife that no government had been able to address satisfactorily. The divide between rich and poor in Spain was immense, and the powerful Catholic hierarchy did little to ameliorate conditions. The result was that destitute peasants and dissatisfied workers supported either radical anarchism or socialism, buttressed by a bitter anticlericalism, while liberalism in Spain tended to be more extreme than in most of Europe. Yet the wealthy landowners and certain areas of the country, especially the North, maintained a staunchly conservative outlook that precluded any serious reconsideration of the nation's social ills. Many Spaniards in fact had monarchist leanings and believed that their country's salvation lay in native Spanish traditions and a strong centralized government. Meanwhile, nationalist movements in the Basque provinces and Catalonia encouraged these people to think of themselves as distinct from the Castilians who ruled in Madrid, and as deserving of more autonomy or even outright independence from the central government... As a result, political instability prevailed throughout the nineteenth and early twentieth centuries. This period was characterized by numerous military coups, a short-lived Republic, and monarchies with varying amounts of political power."

To add to past instability, the revolution of 14 April 1931 that overthrew King Alfonso XIII and established both the Second Spanish Republic and the Spanish Constitution of 1931 also brought to power a left-wing anticlerical coalition government.

The relationship between the new, secular Republic and the Catholic Church was fraught from the start. Between 10 and 13 May 1931, in retaliation for left-wing demonstrators allegedly hearing a recording of the former Royalist national anthem being played through the windows of a nearby flat, more than 100 religious buildings were burned down in a wave of church arson that began in Madrid and then spread to cities and towns throughout the Second Spanish Republic. While some cabinet ministers in the Provisional Government of the Second Spanish Republic wanted to intervene and restore order, others opposed the idea. According to the canonical narrative, Prime Minister Manuel Azaña overruled those who wished to intervene by stating, "All the convents of Spain are not worth the life of a single Republican". Among the many works of cultural heritage that were lost during the 1931 arson attacks was the copy of Marko Marulić's De institutione bene vivendi per exempla sanctorum ("Instruction on How to Lead a Virtuous Life Based on the Examples of Saints") that once belonged to St Francis Xavier.

In response to this and other similar attacks by the Government, Cardinal Pedro Segura y Sáenz, the primate of Spain, urged Catholics to vote in future elections against the government parties, whom the Cardinal alleged wanted to completely destroy religion. Those who sought to lead the 'ordinary faithful' had insisted that Catholics had only one political choice, the Spanish Confederation of the Autonomous Right (CEDA): "Voting for the CEDA was presented as a simple duty; good Catholics would go to Mass on Sunday and support the political right".

The constitution respected civil liberties and representation, but placed some restrictions on the church's use of its own property and stripped the Catholic religious orders of their previous role in the public education system. Even advocates of the separation of church and state had serious problems with the Constitution; one such advocate, José Ortega y Gasset, stated, "the article in which the Constitution legislates the actions of the Church seems highly improper to me".

In 1933, Pope Pius XI also condemned the Spanish Republican Government's refusal to grant religious toleration to Catholics in the encyclical Dilectissima Nobis.

Since the left considered reform of the anti-clerical passages of the constitution absolutely unacceptable, historian Stanley G. Payne believes, "the Republic as a democratic constitutional regime was doomed from the outset", and it has been posited that such a "hostile" approach to the issues of church and state was a substantial cause of the breakdown of democracy and in the onset of the civil war. One legal commentator has stated plainly "the gravest mistake of the Constitution of 1931—Spain's last democratic Constitution prior to 1978—was its hostile attitude towards the Catholic Church".

In the 1936 general election, the Popular Front, a broad left-of-centre coalition whose members ranged from the constitutionalist Republican Union, Republican Left and PSOE to the more extreme Communists and POUM, won a majority in Parliament. In the months that followed, street confrontations between pro-government and conservative demonstrators became commonplace. On 17 July, the armed forces staged a partially successful coup d'etat which heralded the onset of the Spanish Civil War, at which point Republican activists had the justification of suppressing pro-Nationalist fifth columnists (a term originally coined to refer to Nationalists behind the Republican lines).

== 1933 election and aftermath ==
In the 1933 elections to the Cortes Generales, the clerical conservative CEDA won a plurality of seats, but President Niceto Alcalá-Zamora invited the Radical Republican Party and its leader, Alejandro Lerroux to become Prime Minister at the head of a coalition which did include CEDA. CEDA supported the Lerroux government in exchange for three ministerial positions. Hostility between the left and the right increased after the formation of the government. Spain experienced general strikes and street conflicts. Noted among the strikes was the miners' revolt in northern Spain and riots in Madrid. Nearly all rebellions were crushed by the government, and political arrests followed.

Lerroux's alliance with the right, his harsh suppression of the revolt in 1934 and the Straperlo and Nombela scandals combined to leave him and his party with little support going into the 1936 election. (Lerroux himself lost his seat in parliament.)

== 1934 murder of priests and religious in Asturias ==
The murder of 37 priests, brothers and seminarians by leftists in Asturias marks what some see as the beginning of the Red Terror. In October 1934, the Asturian Revolution was strongly anticlerical and involved violence against priests and religious and the destruction of 58 churches, which had been rare until then.

Turón, one of the locales of anticlerical violence, a coal-mining town in the Asturias Province, was a hub of anti-government and anticlerical agitation. The De La Salle Brothers ran an illegal Catholic school there. This enraged the far-left politicians who ran Turón, because of the brothers' refusal to cease religious practice and their civil disobedience of the Constitution's ban on religious education. On October 5, 1934, the agents of the local rebel government invaded the brothers' residence on the pretext of a search for concealed weapons. A Passionist priest, Padre Innocencio, had arrived the previous evening and was about to say Mass for the brothers. He and the brothers were arrested, held without trial, and summarily executed in the middle of the night by a firing squad in the cemetery.

== 1936 Popular Front victory and aftermath ==
In the 1936 elections, a new coalition of socialists (Spanish Socialist Workers' Party, PSOE), liberals (Republican Left and the Republican Union Party), Communists, and various regional nationalist groups won the extremely tight election. The results gave 34 percent of the popular vote to the Popular Front and 33 percent to the incumbent government of the CEDA. This result, when coupled with the Socialists' refusal to participate in the new government, led to a general fear of revolution. The fear was worsened when Largo Caballero, hailed as "the Spanish Lenin" by Pravda, announced that the country was on the cusp of revolution.

== Early outbreak of violence ==
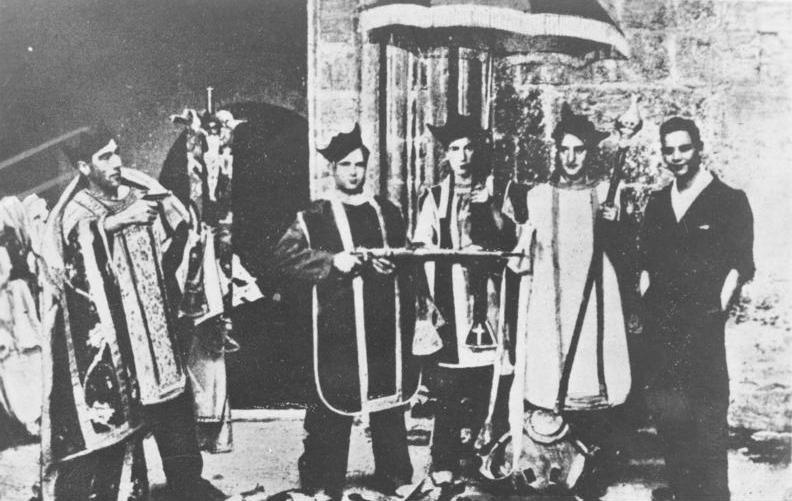
Militants after looting a church and posing with liturgical clothing and items

Following the outbreak of full-scale civil war, there was an explosion of atrocities in Republican zones, as well as the Nationalist zones.

The greatest anticlerical bloodletting was at the beginning of the civil war when large areas of the country fell under the control of pro-government militias. A large part of the terror consisted of a perceived revenge against bosses and clergy, as they lost their powerful position in the social revolution, and the move towards extremism that took place in the first months of the civil war. According to historian Antony Beevor, "In republican territory the worst of the violence was mainly a sudden and quickly spent reaction of suppressed fear, exacerbated by desires of revenge for the past" in contrast with "the relentless purging of 'reds and atheists' in nationalist territory". After the coup, the remaining days in July saw 861 priests and religious murdered, 95 of them on 25 July, feast day of St James, patron saint of Spain. August saw a further 2,077 clerical victims. After just two months of civil war, 3,400 priests, monks and nuns had been murdered. The same day of the fatal injury of Buenaventura Durruti 52 prisoners were executed by anarchist militiamen as reprisals.

According to recent research, some of the Republican death squads were heavily staffed by members of the Soviet Union's secret police, the NKVD. According to historian Ronald Radosh, "The price the Republicans paid for Soviet aid was the very factor that led to the Republic's eventual demise. In exchange for military aid, Stalin demanded the transformation of the Republic into a prototype for the so-called People's Democracies of Post-War Eastern and Central Europe. In addition to generals and supplies, Stalin sent the Soviet secret police (the NKVD) and the military intelligence unit (the GRU) to Spain. There the GRU established secret prisons, carried out assassinations and kidnappings, and functioned under its own laws and guidelines, independent of the Republican Government."

The most infamous NKVD agent who served in the Republican death squads was Erich Mielke, who later became the widely detested head of East Germany's secret police, the Stasi, from 1957 through 1989. In a 1991 interview with intelligence historian John. O. Koehler, International Brigades veteran Walter Janka recalled, "While I was fighting at the front, shooting at the Fascists, Mielke served in the rear, shooting Trotskyists and Anarchists."

According to Payne, "During the first months of the fighting most of the deaths did not come from combat on the battlefield but from political executions in the rear—the 'Red' and 'White' terrors. The terror consisted of semi-organised actions perpetrated by almost all of the leftist groups, Basque nationalists, largely Catholic but still mostly aligned with the Republicans, being an exception". Payne also contends that unlike the repression by the right, which "was concentrated against the most dangerous opposition elements", the Republican attacks were more irrational, "murdering innocent people and letting some of the more dangerous go free. Moreover, one of the main targets of the Red terror was the clergy, most of whom were not engaged in overt opposition". Describing specifically the Red Terror, Payne states that it "began with the murder of some of the rebels as they attempted to surrender after their revolt had failed in several of the key cities. From there it broadened out to wholesale arrests, and sometimes wholesale executions, of landowners and industrialists, people associated with right-wing groups or the Catholic Church".

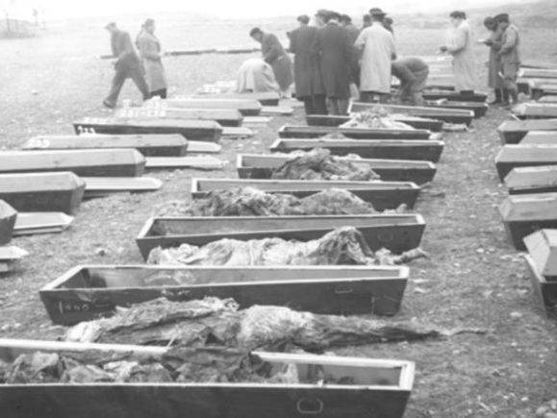
Exhumation of the victims of the Paracuellos massacres in Torrejón de Ardoz, 1936

The Red Terror was "not an irrepressible outpouring of hatred by the man in the street for his 'oppressors,' but a semi-organised activity carried out by sections of nearly all the leftist groups". Julius Ruiz concurs writing that "The terror in Madrid was not extraneous to the antifascist war effort following the defeat of the military rebellion in July 1936; on the contrary, it was integral to it. Securing the rearguard required an organised response."

By contrast, historians such as Helen Graham, Paul Preston, Antony Beevor, Gabriel Jackson, Hugh Thomas, and Ian Gibson have stated that the mass executions behind the Nationalist lines were organised and approved by the Nationalist authorities, and the executions behind the Republican lines were the result of the breakdown of the Republican state and the chaos. That is given backing by Francisco Partaloa, prosecutor of the Madrid High Court of Justice (Tribunal Supremo de Madrid) and Queipo de Llano's friend, who observed repression in both zones.

Julius Ruiz argues that Republican killings were partially rooted in the left's political culture:

These anti-fascists acted on the assumption that terror was integral to the anti-fascist war effort. The fear of a dehumanised and homicidal 'fifth column' was rooted in the exclusionist political culture of the left. After the proclamation of the Second Republic on 14 April 1931, Socialists and centre-left bourgeois Republicans conflated the new democracy with the heterogeneous political coalition that brought it into being after the departure of King Alonso XIII: the Republic's future rested on the right being permanently excluded from power. The victory of the centre-right in the November 1933 elections, the failed Socialist-led insurrection of October 1934 and its subsequent repression promoted a common antifascist discourse based on the dichotomy of the virtuous productive 'people' ('pueblo') (i.e. the left) and a parasitical inhuman 'fascist' enemy (i.e. the right). While the Popular Front's narrow electoral victory in February 1936 was interpreted as the definitive triumph of the antifascist 'pueblo', the struggle against the Republic's right-wing enemies had to continue.

However, Ruiz also notes that the idea of a homicidal, dehumanised enemy within was further reinforced by news of Nationalist atrocities; it convinced Republicans of the need for total victory. When Mola's army appeared in the mountains north of Madrid, this heightened the sense of urgency within the city of the necessity of dealing with alleged fifth columns, which had been blamed for prior Republican defeats. Nationalist bombing raids also created further fear, as Republicans became convinced fascists within the society were directing rebel aircraft to their targets. In reality, during the terror of 1936 there was no fifth column in place as Nationalist sympathisers within the city were convinced Mola's northern armies and Franco's southern ones, led by professional officers, would easily crush the militia defending the city, negating any need for risky subversive activity. It was only after the failure of Franco's onslaught in the winter of 1936–37, when it became clear the war would last longer and the front lines had stabilised, that a fifth column did emerge, though it was never as powerful or extensive as the Republicans feared; it largely focused on mutual assistance, espionage and undermining Republican morale, eschewing terrorist activities such as bombings and assassinations. While fifth columnists did contribute to the Nationalist war effort, the fall of Madrid was not caused by internal subversion but defeat in battle. The largest and most efficient of these groups was about 6000 strong and was a Falangist women's welfare network known as Hermanidad Auxilio Azul María Paz.

As early as 11 May 1931, when mob violence against the Republic's perceived enemies had led to the burning of churches, convents, and religious schools, the Church had sometimes been seen as the ally of the authoritarian right. The academic Mary Vincent has written: "There was no doubt that the Church would line up with the rebels against the Republic. The Jesuit priests of the city of Salamanca were among the first volunteers to present themselves to the military authorities.... The tragedy of the Second Republic was that it abetted its own destruction; the tragedy of the Church was that it became so closely allied with its self-styled defenders". During the war, the Nationalists said that 20,000 priests had been killed; the figure is now put at 4,184 priests, 2,365 members of other religious institutes and 283 nuns, the vast majority during the summer of 1936.

Payne has called the terror the "most extensive and violent persecution of Catholicism in Western History, in some way even more intense than that of the French Revolution", leaving Catholics with little alternative, and driving them to the Nationalists even more than it would have been expected.

== Death toll ==
Figures for the Red Terror range from 38,000 to 110,965. Historian Beevor "reckons Franco's ensuing 'white terror' claimed 200,000 lives. The 'red terror' had already killed 38,000." According to Julio de la Cueva, the toll of the Red Terror was 72,344 lives. Hugh Thomas and Paul Preston said that the death toll was 55,000, and Spanish historian Julian Casanova said that the death toll was fewer than 60,000. Julius Ruiz writes that "there were 50–60,000 victims in the Republican rear guard, including over 6000 members of the Catholic clergy."

Previously, Payne had suggested, "The toll taken by the respective terrors may never be known exactly. The left slaughtered more in the first months, but the Nationalist repression probably reached its height only after the war had ended, when punishment was exacted and vengeance wreaked on the vanquished left. The White Terror could have slain 50,000, perhaps fewer, during the war. The Franco government now gives the names of 61,000 victims of the Red Terror, but this is not subject to objective verification. The number of victims of the Nationalist repression, during and after the war, was undoubtedly greater than that". In Checas de Madrid (ISBN 84-9793-168-8), journalist and historian César Vidal comes to a nationwide total of 110,965 victims of Republican repression; 11,705 people being killed in Madrid alone. Historian Santos Juliá, in the work Víctimas de la guerra civil provides approximate figures: about 50,000 victims of the Republican repression; about 100,000 victims of the Francoist repression during the war with some 40,000 after the war.

Estimate	Sources
38,000	Antony Beevor
50,000	Stanley Payne; Santos Juliá
55,000	Hugh Thomas; Paul Preston
<60 000	Julian Casanova Julius Ruiz
60,000	Paweł Skibiński; Martín Rubio; Pio Moa
72,344	Ramón Salas Larrazabal; Warren H. Carroll; Marek Jan Chodakiewicz; Julio de la Cueva
110,965	César Vidal

=== Toll on clergy ===
Estimates of the number of religious men killed vary greatly. One estimate is that of the 30,000 priests and monks in Spain in 1936, 13% of the secular priests and 23% of the monks were killed, amounting to 6,800 religious personnel altogether. Some 283 religious women were killed, some of them badly tortured. 13 bishops were killed from the dioceses of Siguenza Lleida, Cuenca, Barbastro, Segorbe, Jaén, Ciudad Real, Almeria, Guadix, Barcelona, Teruel and the auxiliary of Tarragona. Aware of the dangers, they all decided to remain in their cities: "I cannot go, only here is my responsibility, whatever may happen," said the Bishop of Cuenca. In addition 4,172 diocesan priests, 2,364 monks and friars, among them 259 Claretians, 226 Franciscans, 204 Piarists, 176 Brothers of Mary, 165 Christian Brothers (also called the De La Salle Brothers), 155 Augustinians, 132 Dominicans, and 114 Jesuits were killed. In some dioceses, the number of secular priests killed was overwhelming:

- In Barbastro, 123 of 140 priests were killed, about 88%.
- In Lleida, 270 of 410 priests were killed, about 66%.
- In Tortosa, 44% of the secular priests were killed.
- In Toledo, 286 of 600 priests were killed.
- In the dioceses of Málaga, Menorca and Segorbe, about half of the priests were killed.

In 2001, the Catholic Church beatified hundreds of martyrs of the Spanish Civil War and beatified 498 more on October 28, 2007.

- May 1931: 100 church buildings are burned while firefighters refuse to extinguish the flames.
- 1932: 3,000 Jesuits are expelled. Church buildings are burned with impunity in 7 cities.
- 1934: 33 priests are murdered in the Asturias Revolution.
- 1936: one day before July 18, the day the war started, 17 clergymen are murdered.
- From July 18 – August 1: 861 clergymen are murdered in 2 weeks.
- August 1936: 2,077 clergymen are murdered, more than 70 a day, 10 of them bishops.
- September 14: 3,400 clergymen are murdered during the first stages of the war.

== Attitudes ==
=== Republican side ===
Attitudes to the "red terror" varied on the Republican side. President Manuel Azaña made the well-publicised comment that all of the convents in Madrid were not worth one Republican life. Yet equally commonly cited, for example, is the speech by Socialist leader Indalecio Prieto on the Madrid radio on 9 August 1936 pleading Republican militiamen not to "imitate" the murderous actions of the military rebels and the public condemnation of arbitrary "justice" by Julián Zugazagoitia, the editor of El Socialista, the Socialist Party newspaper, on 23 August.

Julius Ruiz goes on to note, however, that "not cited... are El Socialista's regular reports extolling the work of the Atadell brigade", a group of Republican agents who engaged in detentions and frequently murders of (in the end) up to 800 alleged Nationalists. "On 27 September 1936", Ruiz continues, "an editorial on the brigade stressed that its 'work, more than useful, is necessary. Indispensable.' Similarly, the Prieto-controlled Madrid daily Informaciones carried numerous articles on the activities of the Atadell brigade during the summer of 1936".

=== Nationalist side ===
The hierarchy of the Catholic Church in Spain believed that the Red Terror was the result of a plan, "a program of systematic persecution of the Church was planned to the last detail". Before he was himself abducted and shot without trial by Indalecio Prieto's bodyguards just 5 days prior to the coup, monarchist politician and leader of the opposition José Calvo Sotelo told the Spanish Parliament in April 1936 that in the six weeks since the government, from mid-February 15 to April 2, 1936, had been in power, some 199 attacks were carried out, 36 of them in churches. He listed 136 fires and fire bombings, which included 106 burned churches and 56 churches otherwise destroyed. He said there were 74 persons dead, and 345 persons injured.

The attitudes of the Catholic side towards the government and the ensuing Civil War were expressed in a joint episcopal letter from July 1, 1937, addressed by the Spanish bishops to all other Catholic bishops. Spain was said to be divided into two hostile camps: one side expresses anti-religious and anti-Spanish views, while the other side respects the religious and national order. The Church was pastorally oriented and not willing to sell its freedom to politics but had to side with those who started out defending its freedom and right to exist.

The attitudes of people in the Nationalist zones were characterized by hope and religious revival. Victories were celebrated with religious services, anticlerical laws were abolished, and Catholic schools became legal again. Catholic military chaplains were reintroduced and attitudes to the Church immediately changed from hostility to respect and even admiration.

== Reported murders ==
- Murder of 6,832 members of the Catholic clergy and religious institutes as well as the killing thousands of lay people.
- The parish priest of Navalmoral was put through a parody of Christ's Crucifixion. At the end of his suffering the militiamen debated whether actually to crucify him or just shoot him. They finished with a shooting.
- The Bishop of Jaén Manuel Basulto y Jiménez and his sister were murdered in front of two thousand celebrating spectators by a special executioner, a woman nicknamed La Pecosa, the freckled one.
- Although rare, it was reported that some nuns were raped by militiamen before they were shot. However, according to Antony Beevor, the 1946 nationalist indictment of Republican atrocities contained no evidence for any such incident.
- The priest of Ciempozuelos was thrown into a corral with fighting bulls where he was gored into unconsciousness. Afterwards one of his ears was cut off to imitate the feat of a matador after a successful bullfight.
- In Ciudad Real, a priest was castrated and his sexual organs stuffed in his mouth.
- There are accounts of the people connected to the Catholic Church being forced to swallow rosary beads, being thrown down mine shafts and of priests being forced to dig their own graves before being buried alive.
- An eyewitness to some of the persecution, Cristina de Arteaga, who was soon to become a nun, commented that they "attacked the Salesians, people who are totally committed to the poor. There was a rumor that nuns were giving poisoned sweets to children. Some nuns were grabbed by the hair in the streets. One had her hair pulled out...".
- On the night of July 19, 1936, alone, 50 churches were burned. In Barcelona, out of the 58 churches, only the cathedral was spared, and similar events occurred almost everywhere in Republican Spain.
- All the Catholic churches in the Republican zone were closed, but the attacks were not limited to Catholic churches, as synagogues were also pillaged and closed, though some small Protestant churches were spared.
- The Bishop of Almeria was murdered while working on a history of Toledo. His card index file was destroyed.
- In Madrid, a nun was killed because she refused a proposition of marriage from a militiaman who helped storm her convent.

== Aftermath ==
With the total victory of the Nationalists over the Republicans in 1939, the Red Terror ended in the country. Throughout the country, the Catholic Church held Te Deums to thank God for the outcome. Numerous left-wing personalities were tried for the Red Terror, not all of whom were guilty. Franco's victory was followed by thousands of summary executions (the remains of 35,000 people are estimated by the Association for the Recovery of Historical Memory (ARMH) to lie in mass graves) and imprisonments, and many were put to forced labour, building railways, drying out swamps, digging canals (La Corchuela, the Canal of the Bajo Guadalquivir), construction of the Valle de los Caídos monument, etc. The 1940 shooting of the president of the Catalan government, Lluís Companys, was one of the most notable cases of this early repression.

The new Pope Pius XII sent a radio message of congratulation to the Spanish government, clerics, and people on April 16, 1939. He referred to the denunciation of his predecessor, Pope Pius XI, who had described past horrors and the need to defend and restore the rights of God and religion. The pope stated that the victims of terror died for Jesus Christ. He wished peace and prosperity upon the Spanish people and appealed to them to justly punish Republicans who were guilty of war crimes, but to also exercise leniency and generosity toward the many others who were on that side. He also asked for their full participation in society and entrusted them to the compassion of the Catholic Church in Spain.

Many Soviet participants in the Spanish Civil War were later to fall victim to Joseph Stalin's Great Purge. This was because, according to author Donald Rayfield, "Stalin, Yezhov, and Beria mistrusted Soviet participants in the Spanish war. Military advisors like Vladimir Antonov-Ovseenko, journalists like Koltsov were open to infection by the heresies, especially Trotsky's, prevalent among the Republic's supporters. NKVD agents sent to Spain were therefore keener on abducting and murdering anti-Stalinists among Republican leaders and International Brigade commanders than on fighting Francisco Franco. The defeat of the Republic, in Stalin's eyes, was caused not by the NKVD's diversionary efforts, but by the treachery of the heretics."

NKVD General Pavel Sudoplatov, an ethnic Ukrainian who was later the main handler for his Spanish Civil War colleagues Nahum Eitingon and Ramón Mercader's during the assassination of Leon Trotsky, later recalled, "From 1936 to 1939 there were two life-and-death struggles in Spain, both of them civil wars. One pitted nationalist forces let by Francisco Franco, aided by Hitler, against the Spanish Republicans, aided by Communists. The other was a separate war among Communists themselves. Stalin in the Soviet Union and Trotsky in exile each hoped to be the savior and the sponsor of the Republicans and thereby become the vanguard for the world Communist revolution. We sent our young inexperienced intelligence operatives as well as our experienced instructors. Spain proved to be a kindergarten for our future intelligence operations. Our subsequent intelligence initiatives all stemmed from contacts that we made and lessons that we learned in Spain. The Spanish Republicans lost, but Stalin's men and women won. When the Spanish Civil War ended, there was no room left in the world for Trotsky."

Both the Spanish Red Terror and the NKVD and the SIM's witch hunt for both real and imagined anti-Stalinists, however, had deadly serious political consequences. They horrified numerous formerly pro-Soviet Westerners who had been witnesses, including John Dos Passos, and Arthur Koestler, and turned them permanently against the USSR.

Furthermore, in a public break from his past service in the Spanish Republican Army and its Servicio de Información Militar (SIM) secret police force, Scottish Communist Hamish Fraser converted to Catholicism following World War II and expressed support for granting both diplomatic recognition and the reintegration of Spain under Franco into the international community. In later years, Fraser compared both the Red Terror and the Stalinist witch hunts among the Spanish people and within the Republican Army, in which he had been a perpetrator, with what happened throughout Eastern Europe after it was occupied by the USSR at the end of World War II.

In 2007, the Vatican beatified 498 priests killed by Spanish Republicans during the civil war. Relatives of Catholics who were killed by the Nationalists have requested similar recognition, criticizing the unequal treatment.

== See also ==
- Revisionism (Spain)
- Historiography on Spanish Civil War repressions (numbers)
- Spanish Civil War
- Spanish Republic at War
- White Terror (Spain)
- Erich Mielke
- Martyrs of the Spanish Civil War
- 233 Spanish Martyrs
- 498 Spanish Martyrs
- Paracuellos massacre
- Republican repression in Madrid (1936–1939)
- Political terror
- Calles Law - Similar Anti-Catholic persecutions in Mexico
