= Burning of convents in Spain =

The following is a list of events in which convents in Spain were burned.

- Burning of convents during the French invasion as planned or spontaneous actions of the French army during the Peninsular War (1807-1814)
- Burning of convents in Spain (1835), during the First Carlist War and subsequent ecclesiastical confiscations of Mendizábal.
- Burning of convents in Spain (1902)
- Burning of convents in Spain (1909), during the Tragic Week in Catalonia
- Burning of convents in Spain (1931), a month after the establishment of the Second Spanish Republic
- Burning of convents during the anticlerical violence of the Revolution of 1934
- Burning of convents in Spain (1936) in the months preceding the Spanish Civil War

Despite these events, Spain still holds a large amount of architectural heritage, being the country with the third most UNESCO World Heritage Sites.

== See also ==
- 1834 massacre of friars in Madrid
- Spanish confiscation
- Ensanche
- List of missing landmarks in Spain
- Church arson
