= Atrocities committed during the Spanish Civil War =

Atrocities committed during the Spanish Civil War may refer to:

- Red Terror (Spain), Atrocities committed by the Republican side.
- White Terror (Spain), Atrocities committed by the Nationalist side.
