= Hamish Fraser =

Scottish former communist and writer (1913–1986)

Hamish Fraser (16 August 1913 – 17 October 1986) was a Scottish communist who fought with the International Brigades and was a participant in the Red Terror during the Spanish Civil War. He gradually became disillusioned with Stalinism and resigned from the Communist Party of Great Britain in 1945. Fraser was received into the Catholic Church in 1948, and became an anti-communist journalist and activist. He was the founder and an editor of the traditionalist Catholic periodical Approaches.

== Early life and communist activities ==
Fraser was born into a Presbyterian family in Inverness. He moved to Berwickshire with his family as a child.

In 1931, he entered the University of Edinburgh to study Technical Chemistry. He also became a member of the Young Communist League.

== Spanish Civil War ==
He joined the International Brigades on the outbreak of the Spanish Civil War in 1936, and is the only British International Brigader in the Spanish Republican Army known to have been recruited as an officer of the Servicio de Información Militar. Following the defeat of the Second Spanish Republic, Fraser returned to Scotland and became a full member of the Communist Party of Great Britain (CPGB), rising to the status of group leader at the John Brown & Company Engine and Boiler Works in Clydebank. He authored a successful pamphlet defending the Party's position on the Second World War, The Intelligent Socialist's Guide to World War II, and was subsequently appointed Scottish Propaganda Secretary of the CPGB. He became increasingly unhappy with the party in the mid-1940s, leaving in 1945.

== Conversion to Catholicism ==
Following his resignation, Fraser enrolled in Jordanhill College of Education, becoming a primary school teacher in Ayrshire after his graduation. During his time at Jordanhill, he received religious instruction from a Jesuit priest and was received into the Catholic Church in Scotland in 1948. He became an outspoken anti-communist and campaigned against the Communist MP Willie Gallacher in the West Fife constituency at the 1950 UK general election. Gallacher later attributed the loss of his seat to the efforts of Fraser and other anti-communist Catholics like him. Fraser also helped to introduce the Blue Army of Our Lady of Fátima, an international lay Catholic and anti-communist organisation, to Scotland.

In a break from his past service in the International Brigades, Fraser expressed support for the reintegration of Spain under Franco into the international community following the Second World War. During a speech in Dublin in the early 1950s, Fraser also praised what he called, "the heroic stand of General Franco against Soviet barbarism". He argued that the Red Terror by the Servicio de Información Militar during the Spanish Civil War presaged the similar use of political terror throughout the Eastern Bloc during the early Cold War.

In 1954, Fraser published the memoir Fatal Star, an account of his journey from Stalinism to Catholicism. In 1956, he organized protests against a visit to Great Britain by Soviet Premier Nikita Khrushchev and Nikolai Bulganin.

== Later life ==
Fraser was critical of the liberalising reforms of the Second Vatican Council (1962-1965) and of the contemporaneous emergence of liberation theology in Latin America. In 1965, he left his teaching position to devote himself full-time to his periodical Approaches. The publication reflected Fraser's traditionalist Catholic views and his uneasiness about the changes within the Catholic Church in the 1960s.

== Death and legacy ==
In the 1970s, Fraser served as a Scottish Conservative councillor in the town of Saltcoats, Ayrshire. He died on 17 October 1986 and was survived by his wife, Kathleen Fraser, and his seven children. His son Anthony Fraser edited the Catholic magazine Apropos, a successor of Approaches, until his death in 2014.

== Works ==
- The Intelligent Socialist's Guide to World War II (1943)
- The Truth about Spain (1949)
- Spain and the West (1952)
- Fatal Star (1954)
- Civil rights, yes! : civil war, no! (1971)
- Ireland 1971 : is civil war inevitable? (1971)
- Saltcoats: anatomy of a socialist 'rotten borough' (1971)
- The Scandal of Maynooth: A Dossier on Episcopal Policy in Contemporary Ireland (1973)
- Freemasonry and the Church: are they compatible? (1973)

== See also ==
- Louis F. Budenz
- Douglas Hyde (author)
- Scottish volunteers in the Spanish Civil War
