= Constituent Cortes =

Spain's parliament (the Cortes) when convened as a constituent assembly

The Constituent Cortes (Spanish: Las Cortes Constituyentes) is the description of Spain's parliament, the Cortes, when convened as a constituent assembly.

In the 20th century, only one Constituent Cortes was officially opened (Cortes are "opened" in accordance with a mediaeval royal proclamation), and that was the Republican Cortes in 1931. It drafted a new constitution but its work was overturned by the victory of the Nationalists in the Spanish Civil War.

The Cortes in 1977 enacted a new Spanish constitution which it had drafted. It was never officially considered "constituent", as the assembly chosen in the 1977 general elections was not mandated at the time to create a new constitution, but to rule under the constitution of the former dictatorship – the so-called Leyes Fundamentales (fundamental laws).

== See also ==
- Convention Parliament
- Constitutional convention (political meeting)
- Spanish transition to democracy
