= Douglas Hyde (author) =

English political journalist and writer (1911–1996)

Douglas Arnold Hyde
- Born: 8 April 1911; Worthing, Sussex, England
- Died: 19 September 1996 (aged 85); Kingston upon Thames, England
- Known for: Author of I Believed
- Political party: Communist Party of Great Britain (1928-1948)

Douglas Arnold Hyde (8 April 1911, Worthing, Sussex – 19 September 1996, Kingston upon Thames) was an English political journalist and writer. Originally a communist and the news editor of the Daily Worker, he resigned in 1948 and converted to Catholicism. After his conversion, he gained an international reputation in the late 1940s and 1950s as a prominent and outspoken critic of communism. His most famous publication, I Believed, was a great financial success, created with the help of MI6, with reprints secretly being sponsored by the UK Foreign Office's Information Research Department (IRD) to be used as anti-Soviet propaganda.

== Background ==
Hyde grew up in Bristol and was brought up as a Methodist. In his youth, he was an active member in a number of political organisations which brought him into contact with communists. He became a Methodist lay preacher and continued this work for some time in parallel with membership of the Communist Party of Great Britain. He became a communist at age 17 in 1928.

== Career ==
After a period working in North Wales, he moved to London in 1938 and became the news editor of the Daily Worker. He announced his resignation from the newspaper and from the Communist Party of Great Britain in 1948, expressing disillusionment with the Soviet Union's post-war foreign policy.

=== Work with the British secret service ===
After his resignation, he converted to Catholicism and published an autobiography, I Believed: The Autobiography of a Former British Communist, detailing his political and religious journey. During this period, his activities received funding from the British Foreign Office's Information Research Department, and I Believed was republished by an IRD front called Ampersand which translated and distributed the book overseas. The book was written with help from MI6. Hyde also wrote a book, Dedication and Leadership, about his experiences and the specific tactics of the communists especially in the way that they recruited their members and built them into leaders. He embarked on international anti-communist lecturing tours, and contributed a long-running column to the Catholic Herald newspaper which was syndicated in several countries. His writings and speeches attracted considerable global attention, I Believed: The Autobiography of a Former British Communist, selling over one million copies in its first ten years of publication.

== Later life and death ==
Hyde was sympathetic to the emergence of liberation theology, and was dismayed by Pope John Paul II's opposition to it. He became disillusioned with and distanced himself from the Catholic Church in the 1980s and 1990s, listing himself as an "agnostic Christian" on his last hospital admission form. He blocked the republication of his book I Believed, stating it no longer represented his views. He was on good terms with several veterans of the Communist Party of Great Britain such as former MP Phil Piratin in the years before his death in 1996. The Catholic Herald obituary noted that Hyde, a former assistant editor of the newspaper, "ended his life no longer a practising Catholic, but with a renewed interest in Socialism".

== Works ==
- I Believed: The Autobiography of a Former British Communist. London, Melbourne, Toronto: William Heinemann. 1950 – via Internet Archive. German translation Anders als ich glaubte, Herder, Freiburg, 1957 (=Herder-Bücherei, No. 1).
- The Answer to Communism, Paternoster Publications, London, 1949.
- Communism from the Inside, Catholic Truth Society, London, 1949.
- Communism and the Home, Catholic Truth Society, London, 1950.
- God's Bandit: The Story of Don Orione, "Father of the Poor", Peter Davies, London, 1952. Italian (1955), French (1956), German (1957) and Polish (1980) translations.
- Communism at Work, Catholic Truth Society, London, 1953.
- Red Star Versus the Cross: The Pattern of Persecution (with Francis Dufay), Paternoster Publications, London, 1954
- One Front across the World, William Heinemann, London. 1955; Newman Press, Westminster, Maryland, 1956.
- The Mind behind New China, Phoenix House, London, 1956.
- Dedication and Leadership, University of Notre Dame Press, 1956. There is a 1992 edition.
- The Peaceful Assault: The Pattern of Subversion. A Background Book, The Bodley Head, London, 1963.
- The Roots of Guerilla Warfare. A Background Book, The Bodley Head, London, 1965.
- Confrontation in the East. A Background Book, The Bodley Head, London, 1965.
- The Troubled Continent: A New Look at Latin America, Pflaum Press, Dayton, Ohio, 1967.
- Communism Today, Gill and Macmillan, Dublin, 1972; University of Notre Dame Press, 1973.

== See also ==
- Louis F. Budenz
- Hamish Fraser
