= Spanish Constitution of 1931 =

Fundamental law of the Second Spanish Republic (1931-39)

Spanish Constitution
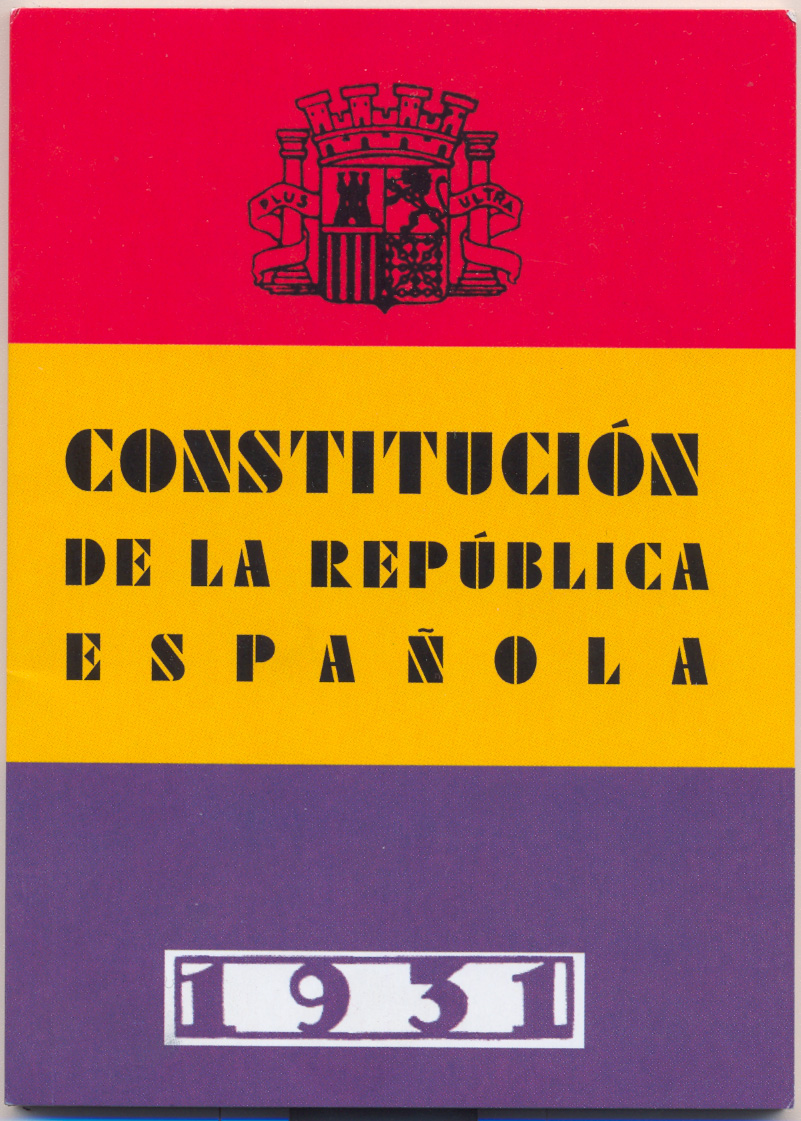
- Preface to the Spanish Constitution of 1931
- Ratified: 9 December 1931
- Repealed: 1 April 1939 (end of the Spanish Civil War)
- Signatories: Niceto Alcalá-Zamora

Full text
- Constitución española de 1931 at Wikisource

The Spanish Constitution of 1931 was approved by the Constituent Assembly on 9 December 1931. It was the constitution of the Second Spanish Republic (founded 14 April 1931) and was in force until 1 April 1939. This was the second period of Spanish history in which both head of state and head of government were democratically elected.

A constitutional draft prepared by a commission under a reformist Catholic lawyer Ángel Ossorio y Gallardo having been rejected, an amended draft was approved by the Constituent Assembly on 9 December 1931. It created a secular democratic system based on equal rights for all citizens, with provision for regional autonomy. It introduced female suffrage, civil marriage and divorce. It permitted the state to expropriate private property, with compensation, for reasons of broader social utility. It also established free, obligatory, secular education for all and dissolved the Jesuits.

The Republic "was the culmination of a process of mass mobilisation and opposition to the old politics of notables." According to the historian Mary Vincent the Constitution envisaged "a reforming regime with an explicit and self-conscious view of what modernising Spain should entail. A secular state operating according to the rule of law with an admittedly ill-defined sense of social justice would open the way for an educated body of citizens to enjoy 'European' prosperity and freedom." According to Frances Lannon however, the articles on property and religion, with their exaltation of state power and disregard for civil rights, "virtually destroyed any prospect there had been for the development of a Catholic, conservative, Republicanism."

The new Constitution, among other laws, is described as having been anticlerical. While it afforded broad civil liberties and democratic representation, it abolished privileges associated with the Catholic Church, and did not explicitly protect Catholic interests or rights. As anticlerical sentiment had been growing for decades, it culminated in escalating mob violence against the Church which the new government was unable to curb. This resulted in severely strained church-state relations, noted as a significant cause of the breakdown of the Republic and of the Spanish Civil War.

== Background ==
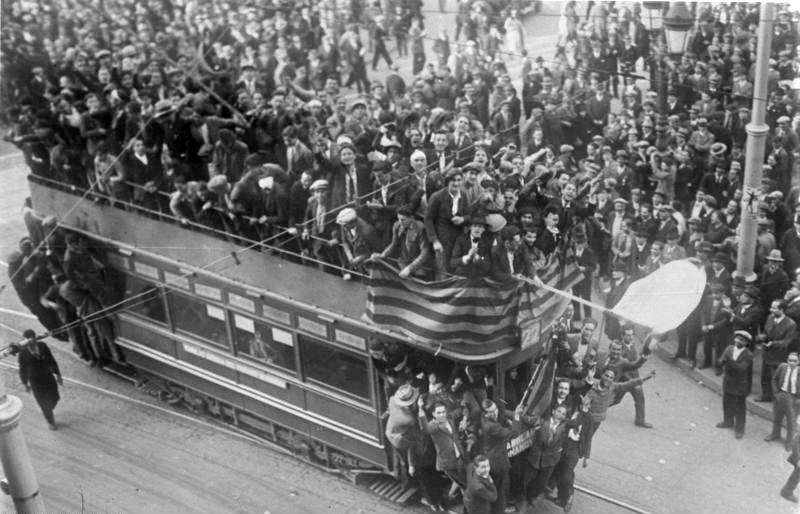
Proclamation of the Second Spanish Republic on 14 April 1931 in Barcelona.

The Second Republic began on 14 April 1931 after the departure from Spain of King Alfonso XIII, following local and municipal elections in which republican candidates won the majority of votes in urban areas. Though Alfonso did not formally abdicate, his departure from the country led to a provisional government under Niceto Alcalá Zamora, and a constituent Cortes drew up a new constitution.

The Second Republic in 1931 brought enormous hopes for Spanish workers and peasants, and in social terms some advances were made, especially for women. Prime Minister Manuel Azaña asserted that the Catholic Church was responsible in part for what many perceived as Spain's backwardness and advocated the elimination of special privileges for the Church. Azaña wanted the Second Spanish Republic to emulate the pre-1914 Third French Republic, make secular schooling free and compulsory, and construct a non-religious basis for national culture and citizenship.

== Provisions ==
Following elections in June 1931 the new parliament approved an amended constitutional draft on 9 December 1931.

The constitution introduced female suffrage, civil marriage and divorce. It also established free, obligatory, secular education for all. However, some laws nationalized Catholic Church properties and required the Catholic Church to pay rent for the use of properties which it had previously owned. In addition, the government forbade public manifestations of Catholicism such as processions on religious feast days, dissolved the Jesuits and banned Catholic education by prohibiting the religious communities of nuns, priests and brothers from teaching even in private schools. The constitution also made the right to property subject to the public good, such that it could be nationalized as long as the owner was compensated.

The constitution granted freedom of religion to all, including non-Catholic worship in Spain.

=== Political aspects ===
Spanish Constitution of 1931 (PDF).

The head of state was the President of the Republic. The President was elected for a six year term by an electoral college, consisting of the members of the legislature and an equal number of "compromisarios". These latter were citizen electors chosen by popular vote.

The legislature was a unicameral assembly, the Cortes Generales ("General Courts"), elected by popular vote for a four year term. The President could dissolve the Cortes and call elections before the end of the term. A President who did so twice could then be removed from office by the newly elected Cortes.

There was also provision for enacting a law by popular initiative. On request of 15 percent of voting-age citizens, a law may be presented to the Cortes.

The executive branch was headed by the President of the Council of Ministers (functionally equivalent to "prime minister"), appointed by the President of the Republic with the approval of the Cortes, who governed with a cabinet of ministers. The prime minister and cabinet could be dismissed from office by the Cortes.

The judicial branch included ordinary courts up to a "Supreme Court". There was also the Tribunal de Garantías Constitucionales ("Court of Constitutional Guarantees"), which ruled on the constitutionality of laws, settled disputes between regional governments, and tried all criminal cases against the prime minister and cabinet, or against judges of the Supreme Court. It was composed of representatives of the President of the Republic, the Cortes, the regional governments, and the bar associations, and four professors of law.

The constitution provided for the division of the country into autonomous regions, generally defined by common cultural characteristics. It also allowed for the creation of additional regions through an Estatuto de Autonomía ("Autonomy Statute").

The constitution could be amended when either the prime minister or one quarter of the Cortes submitted a proposed amendment. The Cortes would then vote on the proposal. If the Cortes passed the proposal by majority vote (a two-thirds majority in the first four years after adoption of the constitution), the Cortes would be dissolved and elections held. The new Cortes would then vote on the proposal.

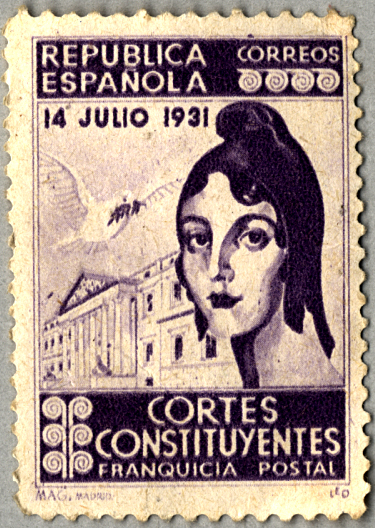
Commemorative stamp

=== Disestablishment of the privileges of the Catholic Church ===
Although the constitution generally accorded thorough civil liberties and representation, there was a notable exclusion regarding the privileges of the Catholic Church, which some regarded as crucial to prevent the forming of an expansive democratic majority.

The controversial articles 26 and 27 of the constitution strictly controlled Church property and prohibited religious orders from engaging in education. This was seen as explicitly hostile to Catholicism, both by supporters of the established Church, and by advocates of church-state separation. One such advocate of separation, José Ortega y Gasset, stated "the article in which the Constitution legislates the actions of the Church seems highly improper to me." Pope Pius XI condemned the Spanish Government's deprivation of the privileges of Catholics in the encyclical Dilectissima Nobis ("On Oppression Of The Church Of Spain").

In October 1931, José María Gil-Robles, the leading spokesman of the parliamentary right declared that the constitution was 'stillborn' – a 'dictatorial Constitution in the name of democracy.' Robles wanted to use mass meetings "to give supporters of the right a sense of their own strength and, ominously, to accustom them 'to fight, when necessary, for the possession of the street.'"

The conservative Catholic Republicans Alcalá-Zamora and Miguel Maura resigned from the government when the controversial articles 26 and 27 of the constitution, which strictly controlled Church property and prohibited religious orders from engaging in education were passed.

Frances Lannon calls the constitution "divisive" in that the articles on property and religion, prioritizing state power, had a "disregard for civil rights" and ruined the prospect of the development of a Catholic, conservative, Republicanism. Likewise, Stanley Payne agrees that the constitution generally accorded a wide range of civil liberties and representation with the notable exception of the rights of Catholics, a circumstance which prevented the formation of an expansive democratic majority.

Since the far left considered reform of these aspects of the constitution as totally unacceptable, commentators have opined that "the Republic as a democratic constitutional regime was doomed from the outset". Commentators have posited that such a "hostile" approach to the issues of church and state were a substantial cause of the breakdown of democracy and the onset of civil war. One legal commentator emphasized that "the gravest mistake of the Constitution of 1931-Spain's last democratic Constitution prior to 1978-was its hostile attitude towards the Catholic Church."

=== Liberties for religious minorities ===
The Spanish Constitution of 1931 attempted to secure religious liberty for religious organizations other than Catholics, halting discrimination and persecution of Jews and Protestants. However, this freedom would be curbed by the Franco's dictatorial regime that granted the Catholic Church the status of official religion of Spain and prohibited other public religious manifestations.

== See also ==
- Spanish First Republic
- Pact of San Sebastián
