= Second Spanish Republic =

Government of Spain, 1931–1939

Spanish Republic República Española (Spanish)
- 1931–1939
- Flag Coat of arms
- Motto: Plus ultra (Latin) "Further beyond"
- Anthem: Himno de Riego "Riego's Anthem"
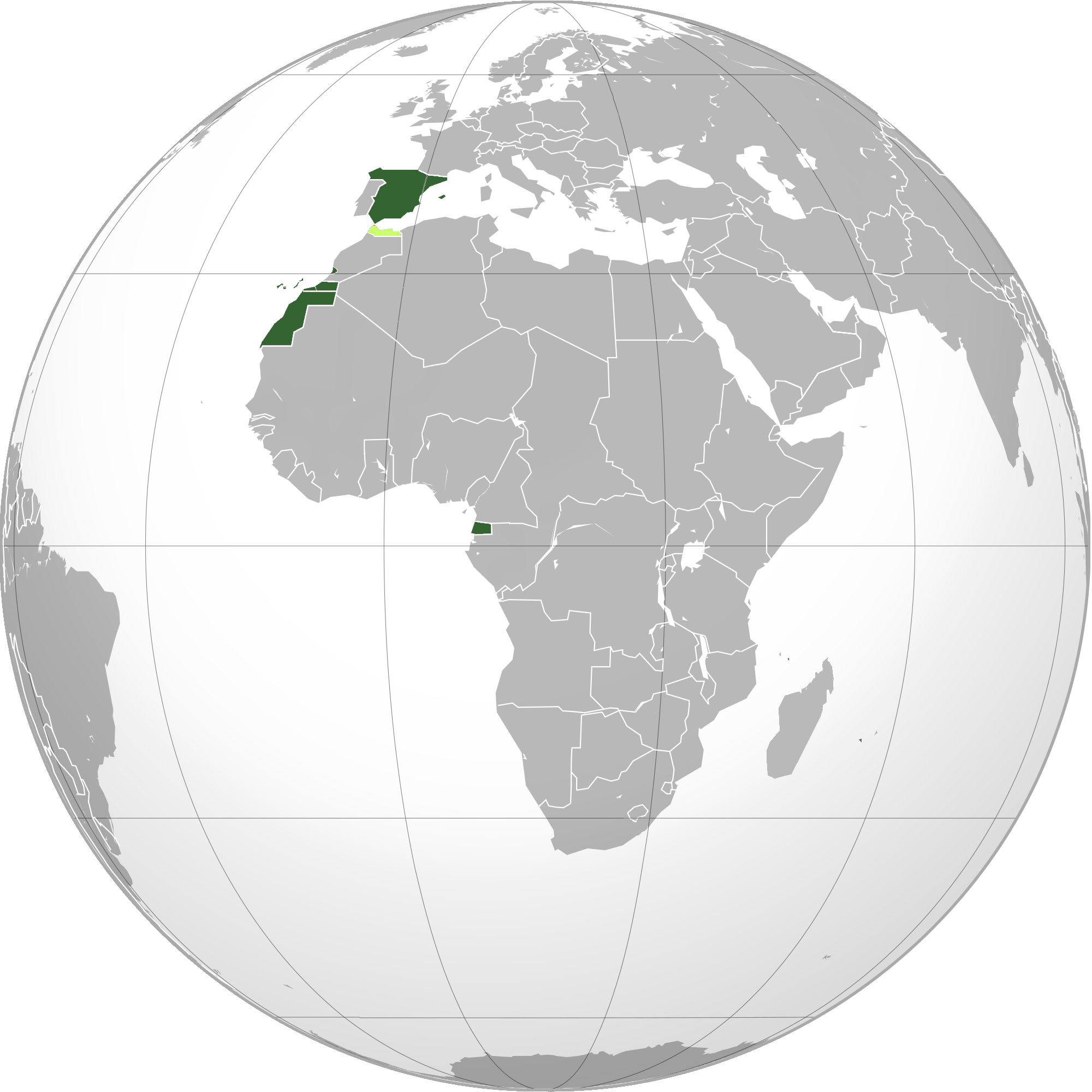
- Territories and colonies of the Spanish Republic
- Capital and largest city: Madrid (Note: In wartime, as Madrid was under siege, the government moved its capital to Valencia on 6 November 1936, and then to Barcelona on 31 October 1937.)
- Official languages: Spanish
- Recognised regional languages: Catalan, Basque (Note: Catalan became official in Catalonia in 1932 as well as Basque in the Basque Country in 1936.)
- Religion: Secular state; Roman Catholic (majority)
- Demonyms: Spanish, Spaniard
- Government: Unitary semi-presidential republic
- President
  - 1931–1936: Niceto Alcalá-Zamora
  - 1936 (interim): Diego Martínez Barrio
  - 1936–1939: Manuel Azaña
- Prime Minister
  - 1931 (first): Niceto Alcalá-Zamora
  - 1937–1939 (last): Juan Negrín
- Legislature: Cortes Republicanas
- Historical era: Interwar period
  - Proclamation: 14 April 1931
  - Constitution adopted: 9 December 1931
  - Revolution of 1934: 5–19 October 1934
  - Spanish Civil War: 17 July 1936
  - Fall of the Republic: 1 April 1939
- Currency: Spanish peseta
Preceded by	Succeeded by
Kingdom of Spain	Spanish State; Spanish Republican; Government-in-Exile

The Spanish Republic (Spanish: República Española), commonly known as the Second Spanish Republic (Spanish: Segunda República Española), was the democratic government of Spain from 1931 to 1939. The Republic was proclaimed on 14 April 1931 after the deposition of King Alfonso XIII. It was dissolved on 1 April 1939 after surrendering in the Spanish Civil War to the Nationalists rebels led by General Francisco Franco.

After the proclamation of the Republic, a provisional government was established until December 1931, at which time the 1931 Constitution was approved. Over the next two years of constitutional government, known as the Reformist Biennium, Prime Minister Manuel Azaña initiated numerous reforms. In 1932, religious orders were forbidden control of schools, while the government began a large-scale school-building project. A moderate agrarian reform was carried out. Home rule was granted to Catalonia, with a parliament and a president of its own.

Soon, Azaña lost parliamentary support and President Alcalá-Zamora forced his resignation in September 1933. In the subsequent 1933 election the Spanish Confederation of the Autonomous Right (CEDA) won a plurality. However the President declined to invite its leader, Gil Robles, to form a government, fearing CEDA's monarchist sympathies. Instead, he invited the Radical Republican Party's Alejandro Lerroux to do so. The period following the CEDA's victory, called "black biennium", was marked by escalating clashes between the left and the right and state-sanctioned repression against the left. The CEDA exercised indirect influence over the government and in October 1934, was finally successful in forcing the acceptance of three ministries. A general strike was called by the Unión General de Trabajadores (UGT) and the Spanish Socialist Workers' Party (PSOE). The strike developed into a 'revolutionary' uprising, allegedly aiming to overthrow the Republican government, although major action took place only in Asturias, where the rebels officially declared a proletarian revolution and abolished regular money. The rebellion was crushed by the Spanish Navy and the Spanish Republican Army, the latter using mainly Moorish colonial troops from Spanish Morocco.

In 1935, after a series of crises and corruption scandals, President Alcalá-Zamora, who had always been hostile to the government, called for new elections, instead of inviting CEDA, the party with most seats in the parliament, to form a new government. The Popular Front won the 1936 general election with a narrow victory. The Right accelerated its preparations for a coup, which had been months in the planning. Amidst the wave of political violence that broke out after the triumph of the Popular Front in the February 1936 elections, a group of Guardia de Asalto and other leftist militiamen mortally shot José Calvo Sotelo, one of the leaders of the opposition, on 13 July 1936. This assassination convinced many military officers to back the planned coup. On 17 July, the revolt began with an army uprising in Spanish Morocco, followed by military takeovers in many cities in Spain. Military rebels intended to seize power immediately, but they were met with serious resistance as most of the main cities remained loyal to the Republic. An estimated total of half a million people died in the war that followed.

During the Spanish Civil War, there were three Republican governments. The first was led by left-wing republican José Giral (from July to September 1936); a revolution inspired mostly by libertarian socialist, anarchist and communist principles broke out in its territory. The second government was led by the PSOE's Francisco Largo Caballero. The UGT, along with the National Confederation of Workers (CNT), were the main forces behind the social revolution. The third government was led by socialist Juan Negrín, who led the Republic until the military coup of Segismundo Casado, which ended republican resistance and ultimately led to the victory of the Nationalists. The Republican government survived in exile and retained an embassy in Mexico City until 1976. After the restoration of democracy in Spain, the government-in-exile formally dissolved the following year.

== History ==
=== 1931–1933, the Reformist Biennium ===
On 28 January 1930, the military dictatorship of General Miguel Primo de Rivera (who had been in power since September 1923) was overthrown. This led various republican factions from a wide variety of backgrounds (including conservatives, socialists and Catalan nationalists) to join forces. The Pact of San Sebastián was the key to the transition from monarchy to republic. Republicans of all tendencies were committed to the Pact of San Sebastian in overthrowing the monarchy and establishing a republic. The restoration of the royal Bourbons was rejected by large sectors of the populace who vehemently opposed the King. The pact, signed by representatives of the main Republican forces, allowed a joint anti-monarchy political campaign. The 12 April 1931 municipal elections led to a landslide victory for republicans. Two days later, the Second Republic was proclaimed, and King Alfonso XIII went into exile. The king's departure led to a provisional government of the young republic under Niceto Alcalá-Zamora. Catholic churches and establishments in cities like Madrid and Sevilla were set ablaze on 11 May.

==== 1931 Constitution ====
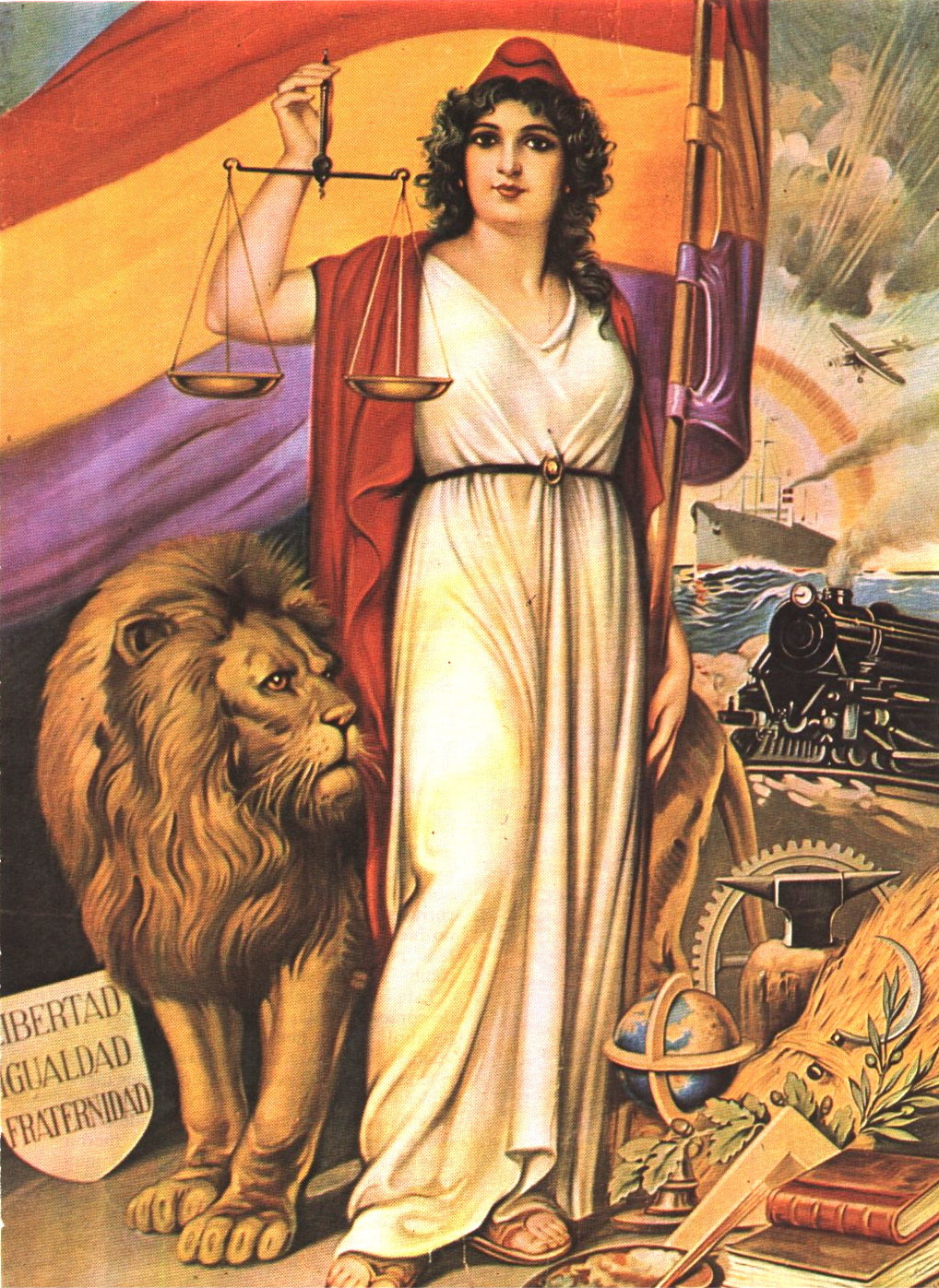
Allegory of the Spanish Republic, displaying republican symbolism such as the Phrygian cap and the motto Libertad, Igualdad, Fraternidad

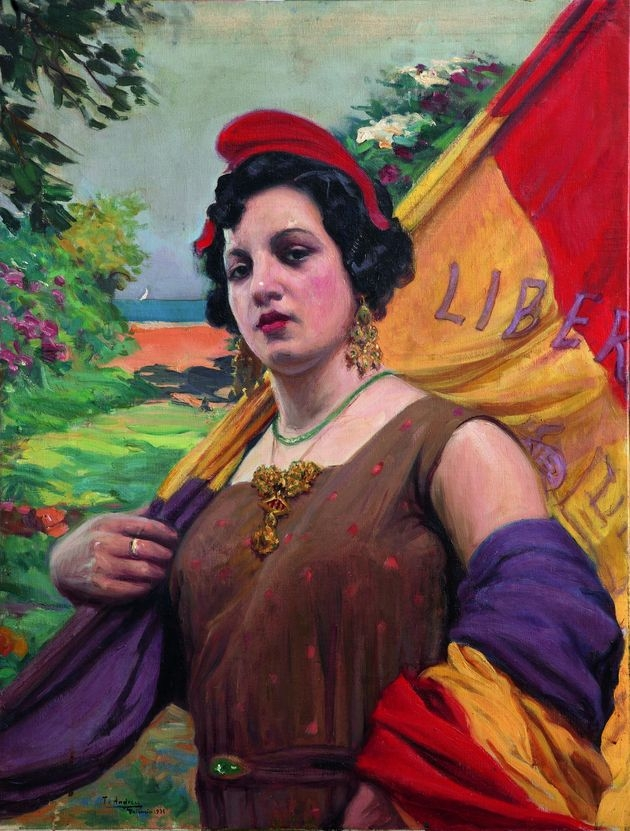
República Española (1931) by Teodoro Andreu

In June 1931 a Constituent Cortes was elected to draft a new constitution, which came into force in December.

The new constitution established freedom of speech and freedom of association, extended suffrage to women in 1933, allowed divorce, and stripped the Spanish nobility of any special legal status. It also ended Catholicism’s status as the state religion and imposed strict limits on the activities of religious orders, including prohibiting them from teaching; these anticlerical provisions were moderated slightly during the constitutional debates later that year. Its controversial articles 26 and 27 imposed stringent controls on Church property and barred religious orders from the ranks of educators. Scholars have described the constitution as hostile to religion, with one scholar characterising it as one of the most hostile of the 20th century. José Ortega y Gasset stated, "the article in which the Constitution legislates the actions of the Church seems highly improper to me." Pope Pius XI condemned the Spanish government's deprivation of the civil liberties of Catholics in the encyclical Dilectissima Nobis.

The legislative branch was changed to a single chamber called the Congress of Deputies. The constitution established legal procedures for the nationalisation of public services and land, banks, and railways. The constitution provided generally accorded civil liberties and representation.

The Republican Constitution also changed the country's national symbols. The Himno de Riego was established as the national anthem, and the Tricolor, with three horizontal red-yellow-purple fields, became the new flag of Spain. Under the new Constitution, all of Spain's regions had the right to autonomy. Catalonia (1932), the Basque Country (1936) and Galicia (although the Galician Statute of Autonomy could not come into effect due to the war) exercised this right, with Aragon, Andalusia and Valencia, engaged in negotiations with the government before the outbreak of the Civil War. The Constitution guaranteed a wide range of civil liberties, but it opposed key beliefs of the right wing, which was very rooted in rural areas, and desires of the hierarchy of the Roman Catholic Church, which was stripped of schools and public subsidies.

The 1931 Constitution was formally effective from 1931 until 1939. In the summer of 1936, after the outbreak of the Spanish Civil War, it became largely irrelevant after the authority of the Republic was superseded in many places by revolutionary socialists and anarchists on one side, and Nationalists on the other.

Various reforms were carried out during the first two years of the Second Republic's existence. Amongst other reforms, a legal entitlement of seven days of paid annual leave was introduced, together with the freedom to strike without the fear of being dismissed, new social security benefits and an eight-hour workday.

==== Azaña government ====
With the new constitution approved in December 1931, once the constituent assembly had fulfilled its mandate of approving a new constitution, it should have arranged for regular parliamentary elections and adjourned. However, fearing the increasing popular opposition, the Radicals and Socialist majority postponed the regular elections, therefore prolonging their way in power for two more years. This way the republican government of Manuel Azaña initiated numerous reforms to what in their view would "modernize" the country.

Landowners were expropriated. Autonomy was granted to Catalonia, with a local parliament and a president of said parliament. Catholic churches in major cities were again subject to arson in 1932, and a revolutionary strike action was seen in Málaga the same year. A Catholic church in Zaragoza was burnt down in 1933.

In 1933, all remaining religious congregations were obliged to pay taxes and banned from industry, trade and educational activities. This ban was forced with strict police severity and widespread mob violence.

The first military coup against the Republic was planned by groups of monarchist generals with the support of exiled monarchist ministers. The attempted coup which became known as Sanjurjada ended in failure. Several hundreds of generals were dismissed, prominent monarchists were imprisoned or had to flee abroad, and the aristocracy was 'punished' with radicalization of the agrarian reform. The coup contributed to the radicalization of the left.

The extreme right did not abandon their plans of overthrowing the Republic, what was manifested in the foundation of the Spanish Renovation and a small fascist party Falange Española, the rise of the militant Carlist movement (Traditionalist Communion, Requeté militias), and propaganda of legitimacy of a military uprising spread by such organizations as Acción Española. Fascism proper was yet a weak ideology, but such historians as Julián Casanova describe the culture of the Spanish anti-Republican right as proto-fascist, similar to Italian "pre-Fascism" and the German Völkisch movement. The anti-Republican right were supported within the Church and the army. At the same time, the authority of the Republic was undermined by an anarchist insurrection which culminated in the Casas Viejas massacre of the anarchists and was followed by state repression.

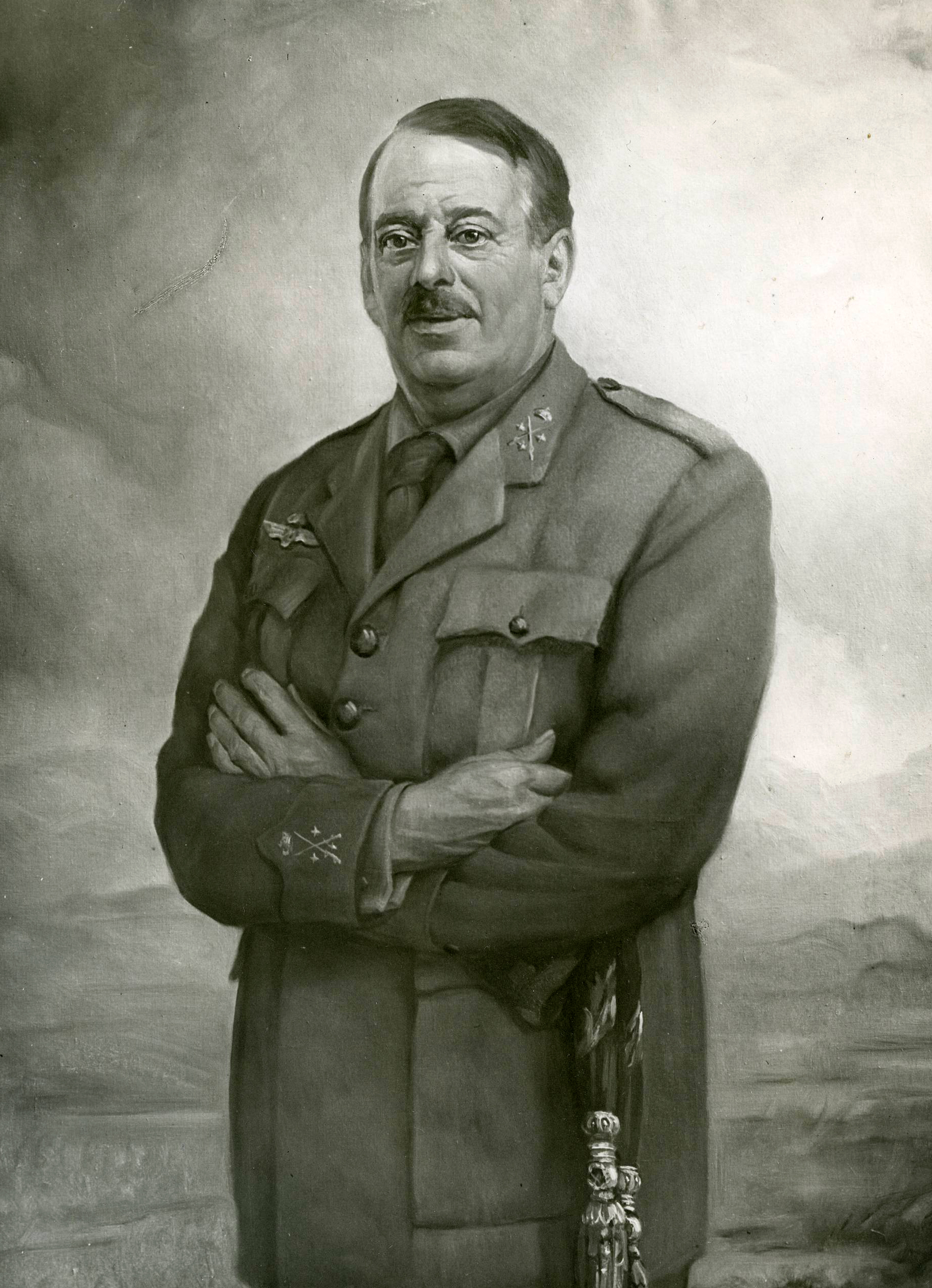
General José Sanjurjo, the leader of the failed 1932 military coup. Having been granted amnesty in 1934 by the right-wing government of the Republic, he was one of the leaders of the 1936 coup.

=== 1933–1935 period, the "Black Biennium" and miners' uprising ===
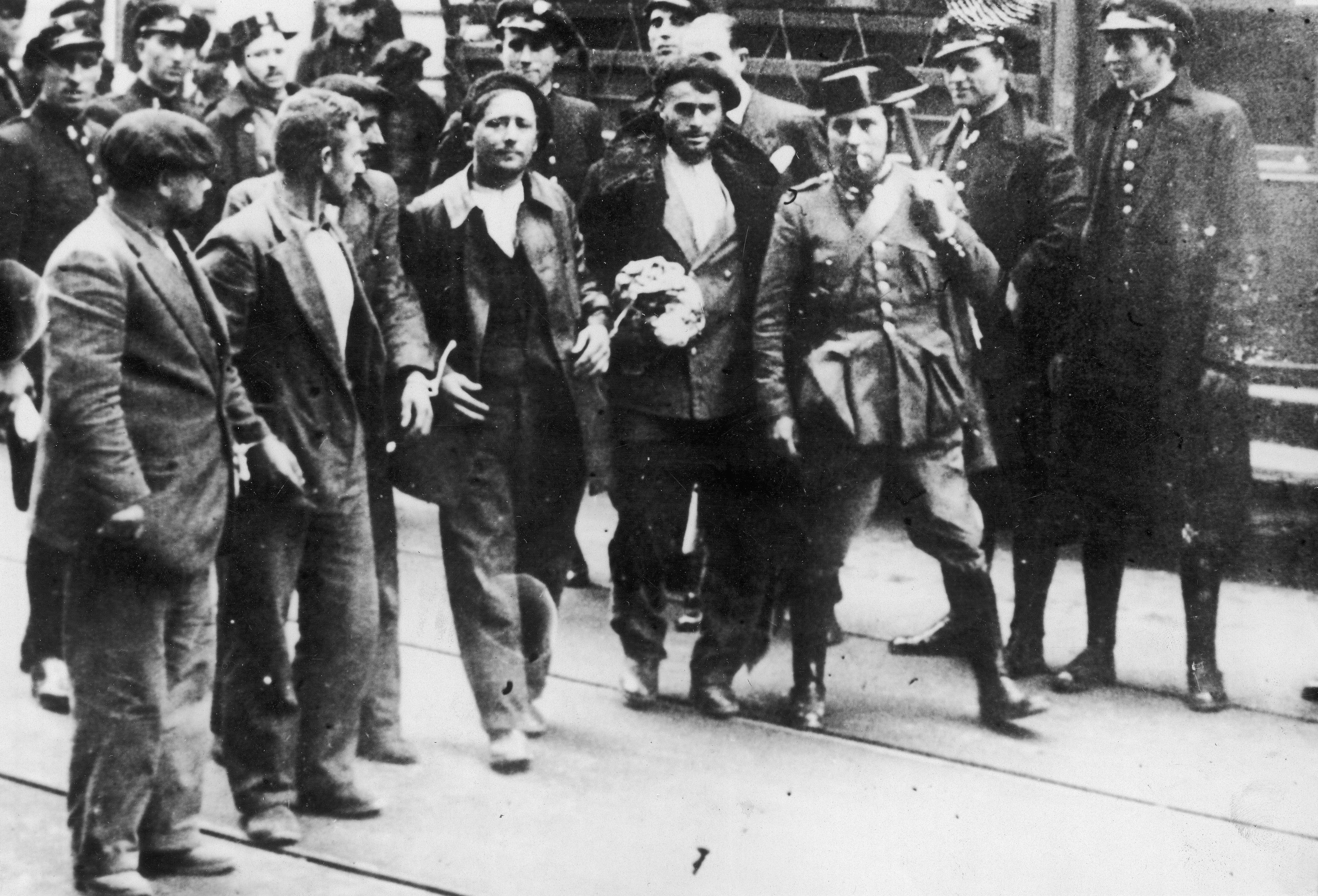
Workers arrested by the Guardia Civil and Guardia de Asalto during the Asturian miners' strike of 1934

Events in the period after November 1933, called the "black biennium", seemed to make a civil war more likely. This period which followed the victory of the right-wing coalition in the elections, was marked by the state-sanctioned "preventive brutality" against workers' movements, state-sanctioned repression against the left which included censorship, crackdowns and deportations of peasants, and violent clashes between the left and the right. The period culminated in the failed socialist and anarchist uprising in Asturias which became known as the Asturian Revolution of 1934.

The majority vote in the 1933 elections was won by the Spanish Confederation of the Autonomous Right (CEDA). In face of CEDA's electoral victory, president Alcalá-Zamora declined to invite its leader, Gil Robles, to form a government. Instead he invited the Radical Republican Party's Alejandro Lerroux to do so. Despite receiving the most votes, CEDA was denied cabinet positions for nearly a year. However, Although CEDA, the largest party in the parliament, did not formally join the cabinet, it exerted indirect influence because the government depended on its parliamentary support. CEDA reinforced this leverage by threatening to withdraw cooperation. Later, Gil Robles claimed that the governing Radical party was "carrying out CEDA's programme". The left viewed the CEDA not only as a threat to their progressive reforms, but to the Republic in general, and more to it, as a fascist party. The CEDA and its leader Gil Robles proclaimed their goals to dissolve workers' movements and parliamentary democracy, purge "Marxists, Freemasons, Separatists and Jews", and establish an authoritarian corporate state, praising Benito Mussolini of Fascist Italy, Adolf Hitler of Nazi Germany and Engelbert Dollfuss of the Austrian Ständestaat. Following the rise of militant revolutionary sentiments within the ranks of PSOE and UGT, Francisco Largo Caballero adopted a revolutionary Marxist rhetoric which justified revolutionism as a way to combat rising fascism, uncharacteristic of European social democratic mainstream and the reformist traditions of the PSOE; the anarchists of the CNT followed a similar rhetoric.

Socialists led by Largo Caballero decided to launch a 'revolution' if the CEDA entered the government, something that, according to Paul Preston, Largo Caballero believed would never happen, hence there were no real preparations for revolutionary action in most parts of Spain. The decision to trigger an uprising if the CEDA entered the government although not publicly proclaimed was known in the government. After a year of intense pressure, CEDA was finally successful in forcing the acceptance of three ministries. The insurrection launched in response became known as the Revolution of 1934. In most of Spain, it was suppressed with little resistance, and the Socialist leadership demonstrated its lack of preparation and will to fulfill their revolutionary threats. A general strike was called by the UGT and the PSOE in the name of the Alianza Obrera. Stanley G. Payne believes that the issue was that the Left Republicans identified the Republic not with democracy or constitutional law but with a specific set of left-wing policies and politicians. Any deviation, even if democratic, was seen as treasonous.

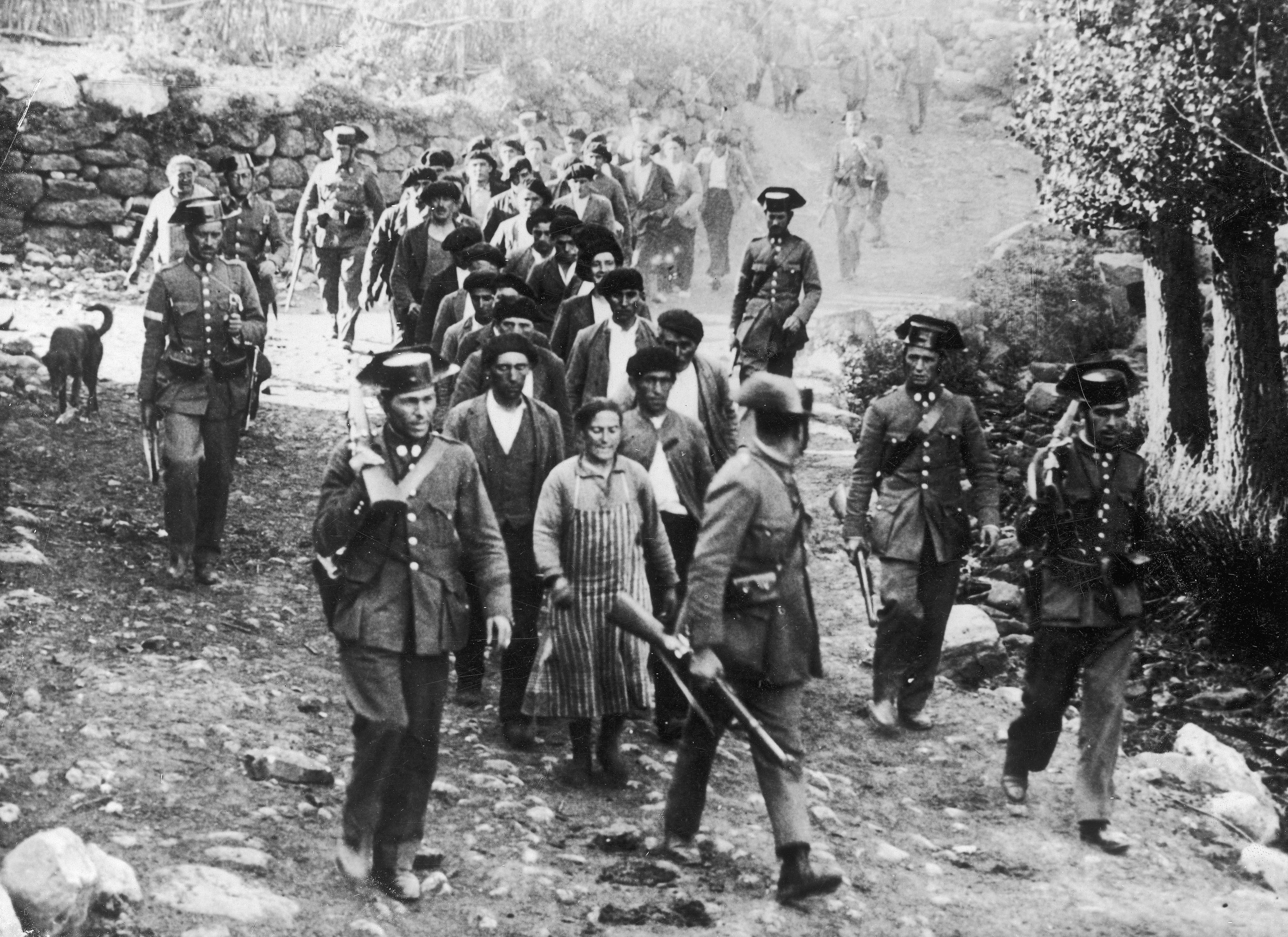
Column of Guardias Civiles during the 1934 Asturian Revolution, Brañosera

The inclusion of three CEDA ministers in the government that took office on 1 October 1934 led to a country wide revolt. A "Catalan State" was proclaimed by Catalan nationalist leader Lluís Companys, but it lasted just ten hours. Despite an attempt at a general stoppage in Madrid, other strikes did not endure. This left Asturian strikers to fight alone. Miners in Asturias occupied the capital, Oviedo, killing officials and clergymen. Fifty eight religious buildings including churches, convents and part of the university at Oviedo were burned and destroyed. The miners proceeded to occupy several other towns, most notably the large industrial centre of La Felguera, and set up town assemblies, or "revolutionary committees", to govern the towns that they controlled. Thirty thousand workers were mobilized for battle within ten days. In the occupied areas the rebels officially declared the proletarian revolution and abolished regular money. The revolutionary soviets set up by the miners attempted to impose order on the areas under their control, and the moderate socialist leadership of Ramón González Peña and Belarmino Tomás took measures to restrain violence. However, a number of captured priests, businessmen and civil guards were summarily executed by the revolutionaries in Mieres and Sama. This rebellion lasted for two weeks until it was crushed by the army, led by General Eduardo López Ochoa. This operation earned López Ochoa the nickname "Butcher of Asturias". Another rebellion by the autonomous government of Catalonia, led by its president Lluís Companys, was also suppressed and was followed by mass arrests and trials.

The suspension of the land reforms that had been attempted by the previous government, and the failure of the Asturias miners' uprising, led to a more radical turn by the parties of the left, especially in the PSOE (Socialist Party), where the moderate Indalecio Prieto lost ground to Francisco Largo Caballero, who advocated a socialist revolution. At the same time, the involvement of the Centrist government party in the Straperlo and Nombela scandals deeply weakened it, further polarising political differences between right and left. These differences became evident in the 1936 elections.

=== 1936 elections ===
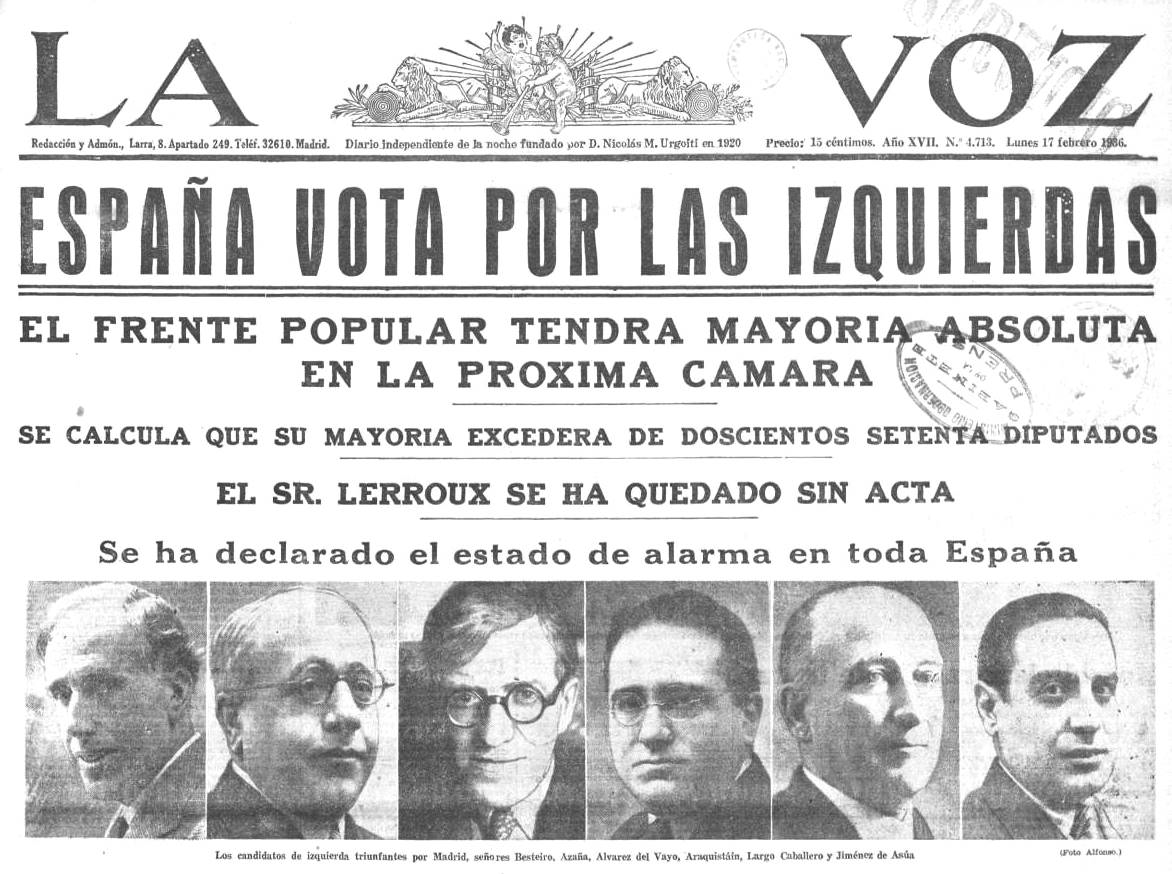
Image from the newspaper La Voz (The Voice) showing the leaders of the popular front elected in the Madrid constituency.

On 7 January 1936, new elections were called. Despite significant rivalries and disagreements, the socialists, Communists, and the Catalan-and-Madrid-based left-wing Republicans decided to work together under the name Popular Front. The Popular Front won the election on 16 February with 263 MPs against 156 right-wing MPs, grouped within a coalition of the National Front with CEDA, Carlists, and Monarchists. The moderate centre parties virtually disappeared; between the elections, Lerroux's group fell from the 104 representatives it had in 1934 to just 9.

American historian Stanley G. Payne thinks that there was major electoral fraud in the process, with widespread violation of the laws and the constitution. In line with Payne's point of view, in 2017, two Spanish scholars, Manuel Álvarez Tardío and Roberto Villa García, published the result of a research where they concluded that the 1936 elections were rigged. This view has been criticised by Eduardo Calleja and Francisco Pérez, who question the charges of electoral irregularity and argue that the Popular Front would still have won a slight electoral majority even if all of the charges were true.

In the thirty-six hours following the election, sixteen people were killed and thirty-nine were seriously injured, while fifty churches and seventy right wing political centres were attacked or set ablaze. The right had firmly believed, at all levels, that they would win. Almost immediately after the results were known, a group of monarchists asked Robles to lead a coup, but he refused. He did, however, ask prime minister Manuel Portela Valladares to declare a state of war before the revolutionary masses rushed into the streets. Franco also approached Valladares to propose the declaration of martial law and calling out of the army. This was not a coup attempt, but more of a "police action" akin to Asturias, as Franco believed the post-election environment could become violent and was trying to quell the perceived leftist threat. Valladares resigned, even before a new government could be formed. However, the Popular Front, which had proved an effective election tool, did not translate into a Popular Front government. Largo Caballero and other elements of the political left were not prepared to work with the republicans, although they did agree to support many of the proposed reforms. Manuel Azaña was called upon to form a government before the electoral process had come to an end, and he would shortly replace Zamora as president, taking advantage of a constitutional loophole: the Constitution allowed the Cortes to remove the President from office after two early dissolutions, and while the first (1933) dissolution had been partially justified because of the fulfillment of the Constitutional mission of the first legislature, the second one had been a simple bid to trigger early elections.

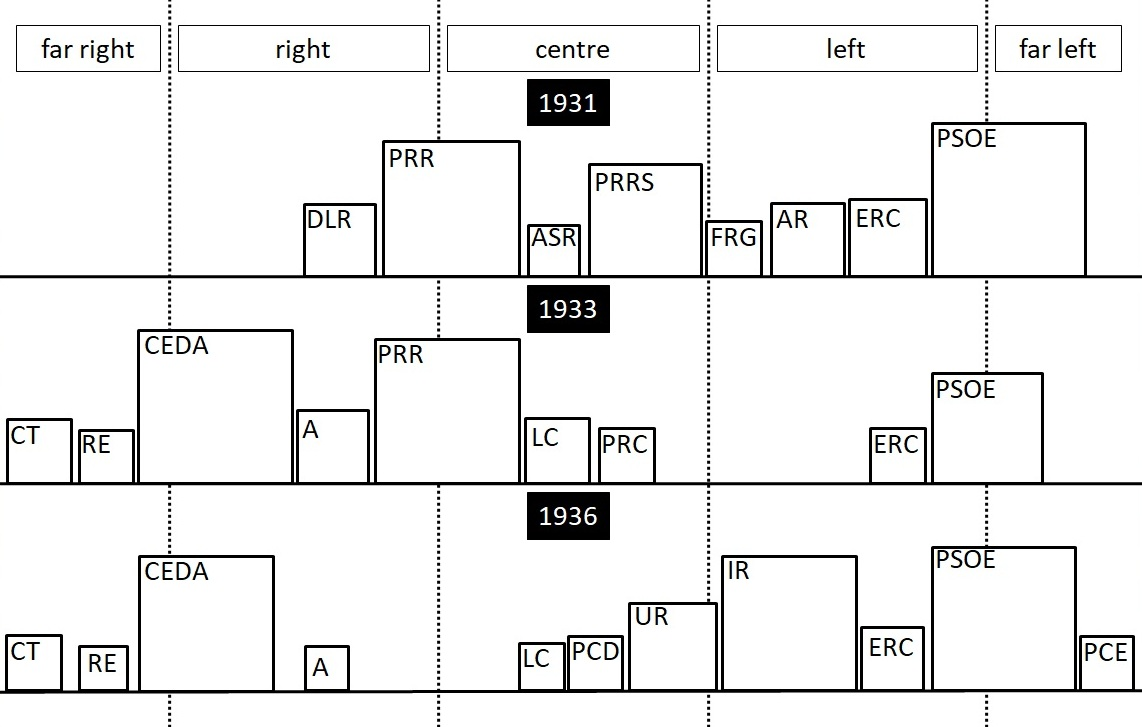
Cortes composition, 1931–1936; size of rectangles proportionate to number of seats; parliamentary groups below 10 seats are ignored. A: Partido Agrario; AR: Acción Republicana; ASR: Agrupación al Servicio de la República; CEDA: Confederación Española de Derechas Autónomas; CT: Comunión Tradicionalista; DLR: Derecha Liberal Republicana; ERC: Esquerra Republicana de Catalunya; FRG: Federación Republicana Gallega; IR: Izquierda Republicana; LC: Lliga Regionalista de Catalunya; PCD: Partido de Centro Democrático; PCE: Partido Comunista de España; PRC: Partido Republicano Conservador; PRR: Partido Republicano Radical; PRRS: Partido Republicano Radical Socialista; PSOE: Partido Socialista Obrero Español; RE: Renovación Española; UR: Unión Republicana

The right reacted as if radical communists had taken control, despite the new cabinet's moderate composition; they were shocked by the revolutionary masses taking to the streets and the release of prisoners. Convinced that the left was no longer willing to follow the rule of law and that its vision of Spain was under threat, the right abandoned the parliamentary option and began to conspire as to how to best overthrow the republic, rather than taking control of it.

This helped the development of the fascist-inspired Falange Española, a National party led by José Antonio Primo de Rivera, the son of the former dictator, Miguel Primo de Rivera, although it only received 0.7 percent of the votes in the election. By July 1936, the Falange had a mere 40,000 members among millions of Spaniards.

In June 1936, Miguel de Unamuno, disenchanted with the unfolding of the events, told a reporter who published his statement in El Adelanto that President Manuel Azaña should commit suicide as a patriotic act.

=== Assassinations of political leaders and beginning of the war ===
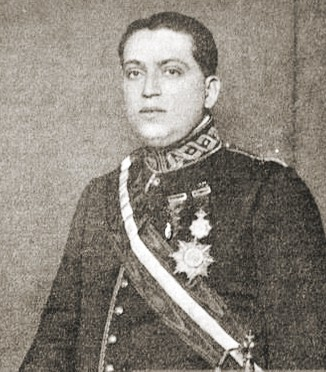
Calvo Sotelo dressed in the uniform of the Cuerpo de Abogados del Estado.

On 12 July 1936, Lieutenant José Castillo, an important member of the anti-fascist military organisation Unión Militar Republicana Antifascista (UMRA), was shot by Falangist gunmen.

In response, a group of Guardia de Asalto and other leftist militiamen led by Civil Guard Fernando Condés, after getting the approval of the minister of interior to illegally arrest a list of members of parliament, went to right-wing opposition leader José Calvo Sotelo's house in the early hours of 13 July on a revenge mission. Sotelo was arrested and later shot dead in a police truck. His body was dropped at the entrance of one of the city's cemeteries. According to all later investigations, the perpetrator of the murder was a socialist gunman, Luis Cuenca, who was known as the bodyguard of PSOE leader Indalecio Prieto. Calvo Sotelo was one of the most prominent Spanish monarchists who, describing the government's actions as Bolshevist and anarchist, had been exhorting the army to intervene, declaring that Spanish soldiers would save the country from communism if "there are no politicians capable of doing so".

Prominent rightists blamed the government for Calvo Sotelo's assassination. They claimed that the authorities did not properly investigate it and promoted those involved in the murder whilst censoring those who cried out about it and shutting down the headquarters of right-wing parties and arresting right-wing party members, often on "flimsy charges". The event is often considered the catalyst for the further political polarisation that ensued. The Falange and other right-wing individuals, including Juan de la Cierva, had already been conspiring to launch a military coup d'état against the government, to be led by senior army officers.

When the antifascist Castillo and the anti-socialist Calvo Sotelo were buried on the same day in the same Madrid cemetery, fighting between the Police Assault Guard and fascist militias broke out in the surrounding streets, resulting in four more deaths.

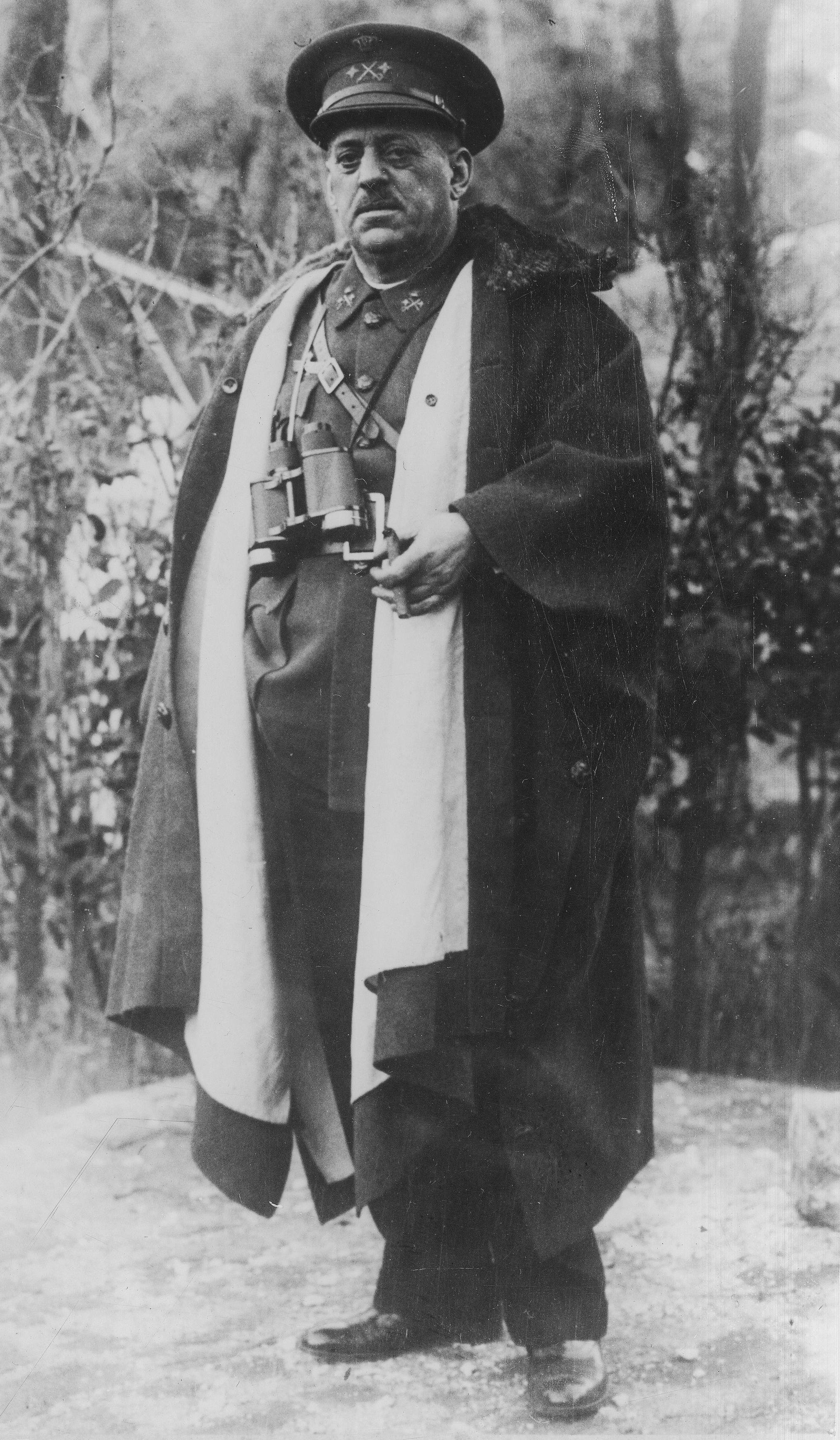
General José Sanjurjo Sacanell, Marquis of the Rif

The killing of Calvo Sotelo with police involvement aroused suspicions and strong reactions among the government's opponents on the right. Although the nationalist generals were already planning an uprising, the event was a catalyst and a public justification for a coup. Stanley Payne claims that before these events, the idea of rebellion by army officers against the government had weakened; Mola had estimated that only 12% of officers reliably supported the coup and at one point considered fleeing the country for fear he was already compromised, and had to be convinced to remain by his co-conspirators. However, the kidnapping and murder of Sotelo transformed the "limping conspiracy" into a revolt that could trigger a civil war. The involvement of forces of public order and a lack of action against the attackers hurt public opinion of the government. No effective action was taken; Payne points to a possible veto by socialists within the government who shielded the killers who had been drawn from their ranks. The murder of a parliamentary leader by state police was unprecedented, and the belief that the state had ceased to be neutral and effective in its duties encouraged important sectors of the right to join the rebellion. Within hours of learning of the murder and the reaction, Franco, who until then had not been involved in the conspiracies, changed his mind on rebellion and dispatched a message to Mola to display his firm commitment.

Three days later (17 July), the coup d'état began more or less as it had been planned, with an army uprising in Spanish Morocco, which then spread to several regions of the country.

Mola's plan for the new regime was envisioned as a "republican dictatorship", modelled after Salazar's Portugal and as a semi-pluralist authoritarian regime rather than a totalitarian fascist dictatorship. The initial government would be an all-military "Directory", which would create a "strong and disciplined state." General Sanjurjo would be the head of this new regime, due to being widely liked and respected within the military, though his position would be a largely symbolic due to his lack of political talent. The 1931 Constitution would be suspended, replaced by a new "constituent parliament" which would be chosen by a new politically purged electorate, who would vote on the issue of republic versus monarchy. Certain liberal elements would remain, such as separation of church and state as well as freedom of religion. Agrarian issues would be solved by regional commissioners on the basis of smallholdings, but collective cultivation would be permitted in some circumstances. Legislation prior to February 1936 would be respected. Violence would be required to destroy opposition to the coup, though it seems Mola did not envision the mass atrocities and repression that would ultimately manifest during the civil war. Of particular importance to Mola was ensuring the revolt was at its core an Army affair, one that would not be subject to special interests and that the coup would make the armed forces the basis for the new state. However, the separation of church and state was forgotten once the conflict assumed the dimension of a war of religion, and military authorities increasingly deferred to the Church and to the expression of Catholic sentiment. However, Mola's program was vague and only a rough sketch, and there were disagreements among coupists about their vision for Spain.

Franco's move was intended to seize power immediately, but his army uprising met with serious resistance, and great swathes of Spain, including most of the main cities, remained loyal to the Republic of Spain. The leaders of the coup (Franco was not commander-in-chief yet) did not lose heart with the stalemate and apparent failure of the coup. Instead, they initiated a slow and determined war of attrition against the Republican government in Madrid. As a result, an estimated total of half a million people would die in the war that followed; the number of casualties is actually disputed, as some have suggested that as many as a million people died. Over the years, historians kept lowering the death figures, and modern research concluded that 500,000 deaths were the correct figure.

=== Tabular summary: 8 prime ministers, 19 cabinets ===
Prime minister	Term		Duration (days)	Composed of/supported by	Why ended	Other
Prime minister	from	to	Duration (days)	Composed of/supported by	Why ended	Other
Niceto Alcalá-Zamora	14 April 1931	14 October 1931	193	DLR, PSOE, PRR, PRRS, AR, ORGA, ACR	resigned due to internal controversy over religious issues	
Manuel Azaña	14 October 1931	12 September 1933	699	PSOE, AR, PRRS, ORGA (periodically ACR, PRR, ERC, PRDF)	resigned due to withdrawal of presidential support and internal controversy over social policy	formally 3 cabinets
Alejandro Lerroux	12 September 1933	9 October 1933	27	PRR, PRRS, IRS, AR, PRG, ERC, PURA	failed the confidence motion	
Diego Martínez Barrio	9 October 1933	16 December 1933	68	PRR, PRRS, IRS, AR, PRG, ERC, PRP	intended as transitory; resigned following new elections	
Alejandro Lerroux	16 December 1933	28 April 1934	133	PRR, PRG, PRLD, PRP, PURA (supported by CEDA)	resigned due to controversy with president over amnesty legislation	formally 2 cabinets
Ricardo Samper	28 April 1934	4 October 1934	159	PRR, PRLD, PRP, PAE (supported by CEDA)	resigned due to pressure by CEDA	
Alejandro Lerroux	4 October 1934	25 September 1935	356	PRR, CEDA, PRLD, PAE	resigned due to withdrawal of presidential support and internal controversy over 1936 budget	formally 3 cabinets
Joaquín Chapaprieta	25 September 1935	14 December 1935	80	PRR, CEDA, LR, PAE	resigned due to internal controversy over 1936 budget and financial scandals	formally 2 cabinets
Manuel Portela	14 December 1935	19 February 1936	67	PAE, PRLD, PRR, PRP, LR (periodically PCD)	intended as transitory; resigned following new elections	formally 2 cabinets
Manuel Azaña	19 February 1936	10 May 1936	81	IR, UR (supported by PSOE)	Azaña elected president of the republic	formally 2 cabinets
Santiago Casares	13 May 1936	19 July 1936	67	IR, UR, ERC (supported by PSOE)	resigned due to military coup unfolding	

=== Civil War ===
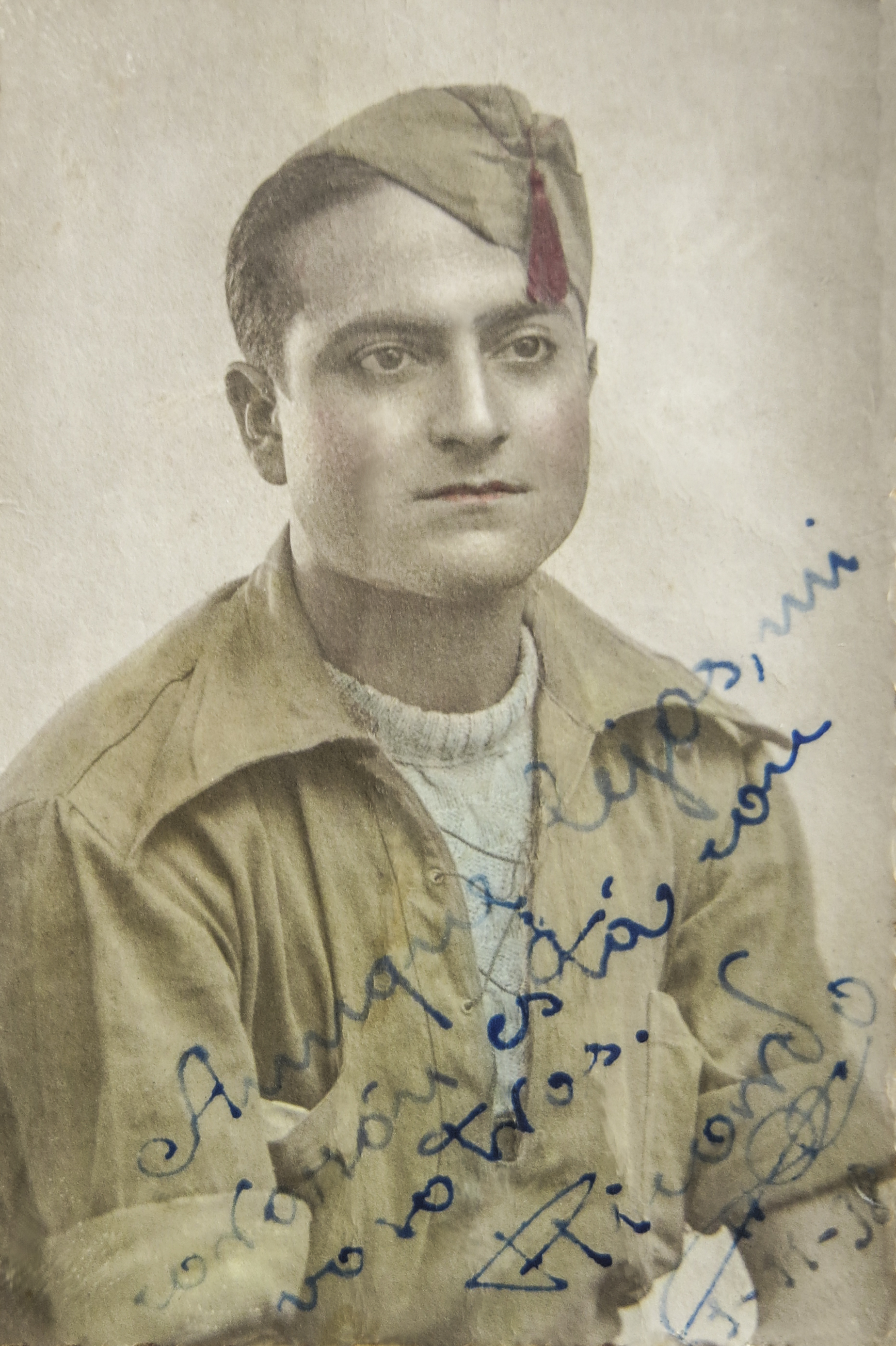
Valencian Republican soldier

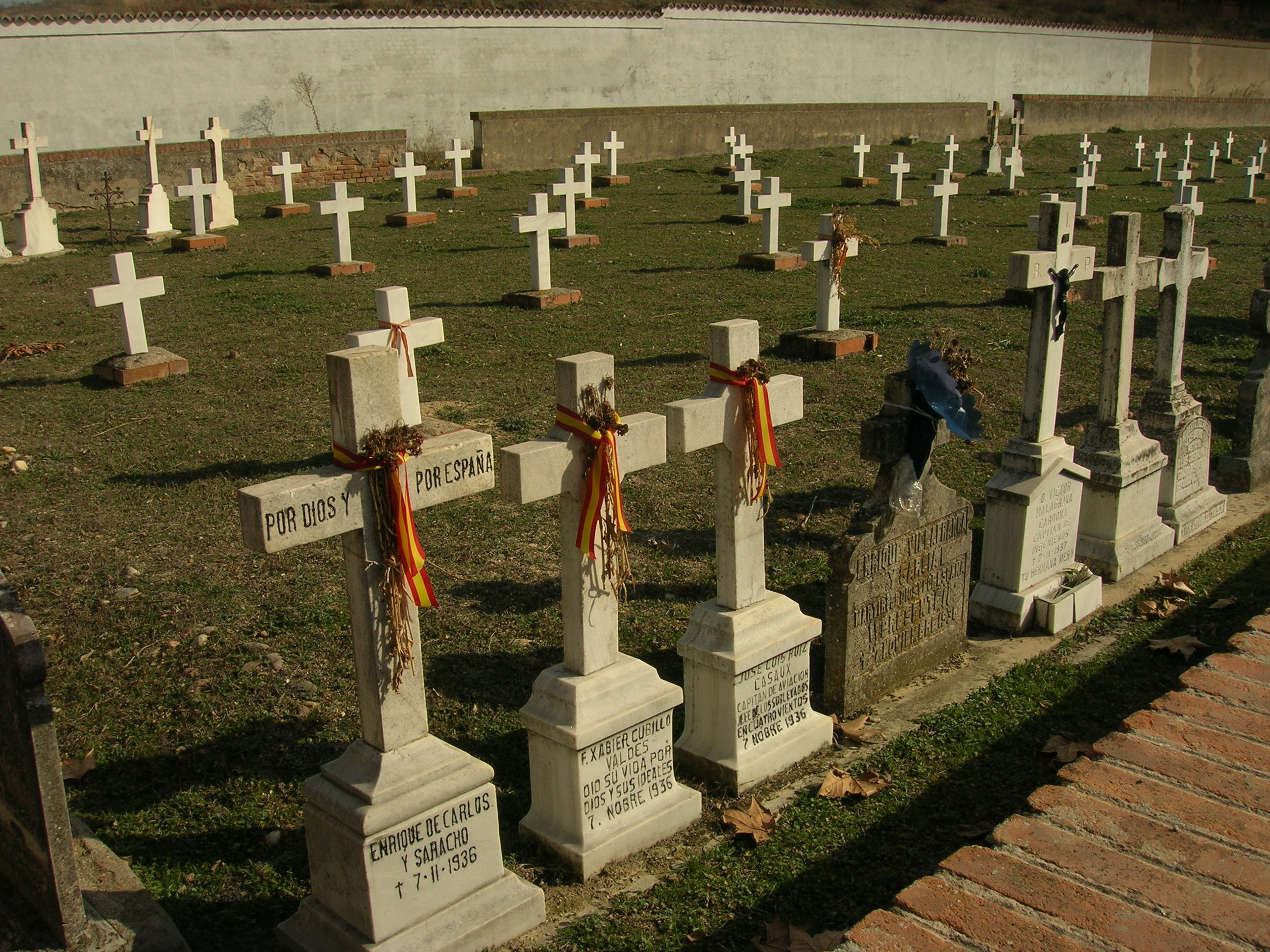
Victims of the Paracuellos massacre committed by the Republicans. The Republicans committed many acts of torture, murder, and war crimes throughout the war known as the Red Terror (Spain).

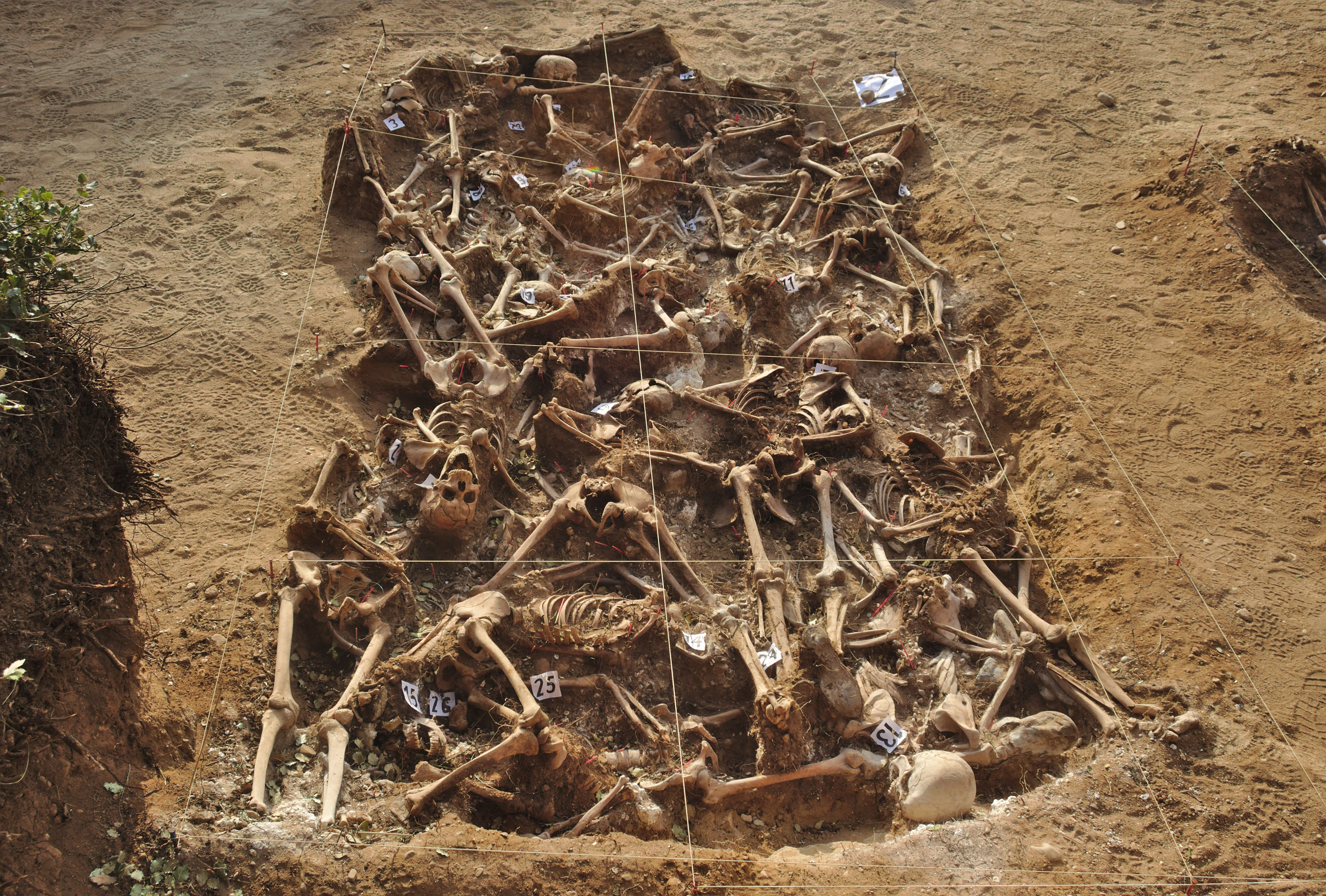
A mass grave at the small town of Estépar, in Burgos, northern Spain. It contains the remains of twenty-six republicans who were executed early in the Spanish Civil War, between August and September 1936, by fascists who belonged to Franco's Nationalists. It was excavated in July and August 2014.

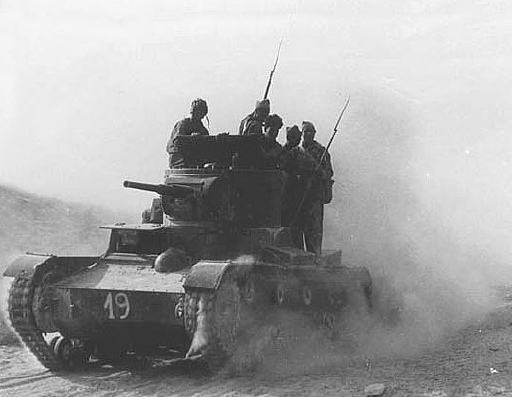
International Brigadiers volunteered on the side of the Republic. The photo shows members of the XI International Brigade on a T-26 tank during the Battle of Belchite (August–September 1937).

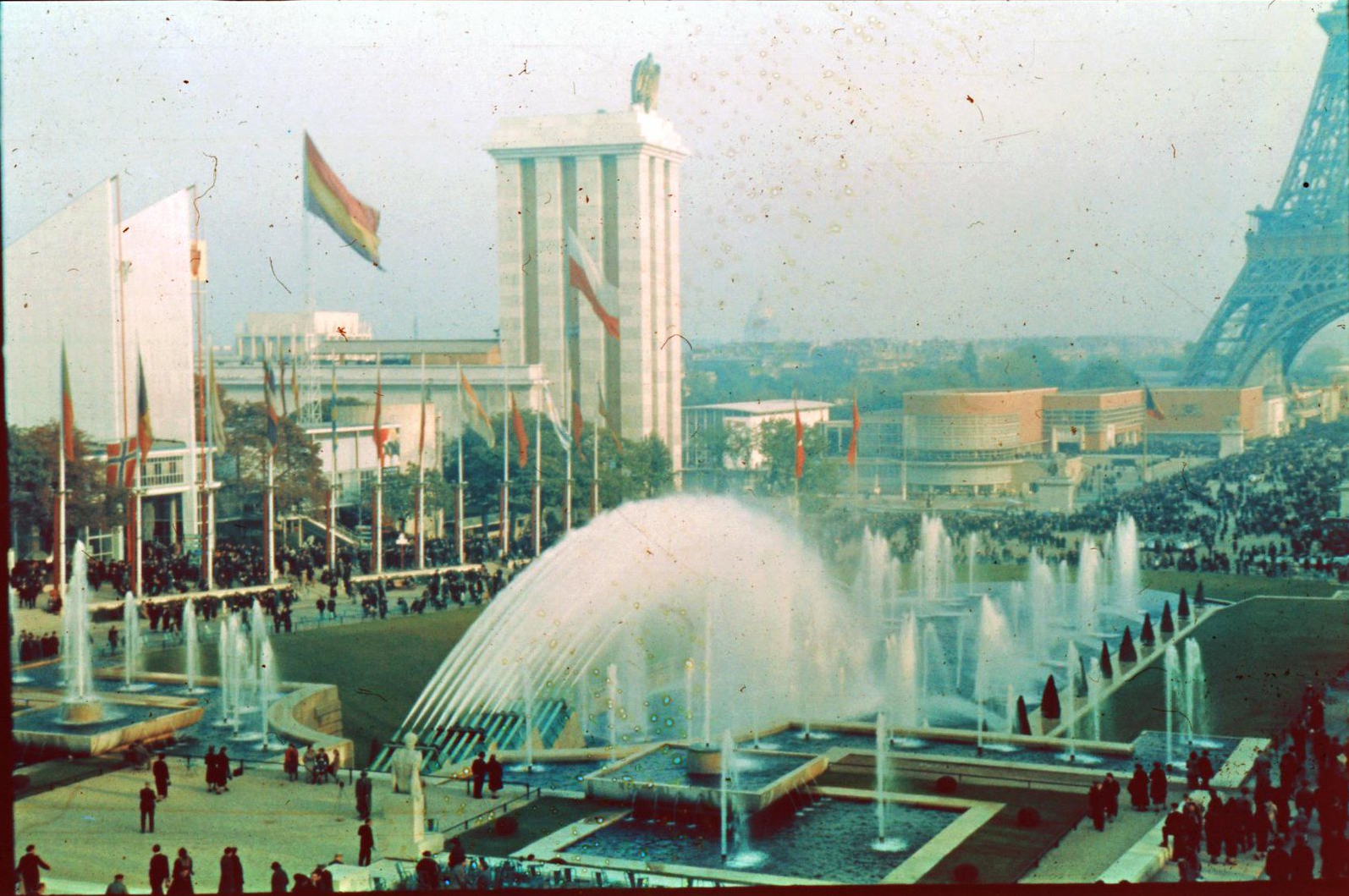
Spanish flag marking the place of exhibition of Picasso's painting Guernica in Paris during the World Expo in 1937 (Agfacolor).

On 17 July 1936, General Franco led the Spanish Army of Africa from Morocco to attack the mainland, while another force from the north under General Emilio Mola moved south from Navarre. Military units were also mobilised elsewhere to take over government institutions. Before long the professional Army of Africa had much of the south and west under the control of the rebels and by October 1936, Time Magazine declared that "façade of the Spanish Republic was crumbling". Bloody purges followed in each piece of captured "Nationalist" territory in order to consolidate Franco's future regime. Although both sides received foreign military aid, the help that Fascist Italy, Nazi Germany (as part of the Italian military intervention in Spain and the German involvement in the Spanish Civil War), and neighbouring Portugal gave the rebels was much greater and more effective than the assistance that the Republicans received from the USSR, Mexico, and volunteers of the International Brigades. While the Axis powers wholeheartedly assisted General Franco's military campaign, the governments of France, Britain, and other European powers pursued a policy of non-interventionism, as exemplified by the actions of the Non-Intervention Committee. Imposed in the name of neutrality, the international isolation of the Spanish Republic ended up favouring the interests of the future Axis powers.

Early in the war, the rebels won the Siege of the Alcázar at Toledo after a long siege. The Republicans managed to hold Madrid, despite a Nationalist assault in November 1936, and frustrated subsequent offensives against the capital at Jarama and Guadalajara in 1937. Soon, though, the rebels began to erode their territory, starving Madrid and making inroads into the east. The north, including the Basque country, fell in late 1937, and the Aragon front collapsed shortly afterward. The bombing of Guernica was probably the most infamous event of the war and inspired Picasso's painting. It was used as a testing ground for the German Luftwaffe's Condor Legion. The Battle of the Ebro in July–November 1938 was the final desperate attempt by the Republicans to turn the tide. When this failed and Barcelona fell to the rebels in early 1939, it was clear the war was over. The remaining Republican fronts collapsed, and Madrid fell in March 1939.

== Economy ==
The Second Spanish Republic's economy was mostly agrarian, and many historians call Spain during this time a "backward nation". Major industries of the Second Spanish Republic were located in the Basque region (due to it having Europe's best high-grade non-phosphoric ore) and Catalonia. This greatly contributed to Spain's economic hardships, as their center of industry was located on the opposite side of the country from their resource reserves, resulting in immense transportation costs due to the mountainous Spanish terrain. Compounding economic woes was Spain's low export rate and heavily domestic manufacturing industry. High levels of poverty left many Spaniards open to extremist political parties in search of a solution.

== See also ==
- Spanish Republican Armed Forces
- Spanish Republican government in exile
- Flag of the Second Spanish Republic
- Coat of arms of the Second Spanish Republic
- Order of the Spanish Republic
- LAPE (Líneas Aéreas Postales Españolas), the Spanish Republican Airline
- Catholicism in the Second Spanish Republic
- Sanjurjada
- Electoral Carlism (Second Republic)
- Reign of Alfonso XIII
- Posición Yuste
- Second biennium of the Second Spanish Republic
