= Dilectissima Nobis =

1933 papal encyclical by Pius XI

Dilectissima Nobis ("On Oppression of the Church of Spain") is an encyclical issued by Pope Pius XI on 3 June 1933, in which he decried persecution of the Church in Spain, citing the expropriation of all Church buildings, episcopal residences, parish houses, seminaries and monasteries. He protested "serious offenses committed against the Divine Majesty, with the numerous violations of His sacrosanct rights and with so many transgressions of His laws, We have sent to heaven fervent prayers asking God to pardon the offenses against Him".

== History ==
The Republican government, which came to power in Spain in 1931, was strongly anti-Catholic by secularising education, prohibiting religious education in schools, and expelling the Jesuits from the country. The Spanish Constitution of 1931 was marked by what Catholics considered a deprivation of their rights. By law, the Church's properties became the property of the state, and the Church had to pay rent and taxes to the state to continue its use of those properties. In the Pope's words: "Thus the Catholic Church is compelled to pay taxes on what was violently wrenched from her". The encyclical also denounced the fact that religious vestments, liturgical instruments, statues, pictures, vases, gems and similar objects necessary for worship were expropriated as well. It condemned the expropriation of all private Catholic schools from religious orders, which were to reopen them as secular schools.

Pope Pius XI, whose church faced similar persecutions in the Soviet Union and in Mexico, called on Spanish Catholics to defend themselves against the persecution with all legal means. He had condemned similar destructive forces in the encyclical Quas primas in 1925.

The encyclical pointed to greed as a motivation for the theft of the Church's artistic treasures and indicated that the government showed no regard for the dignity of country's faithful and their attachment to the religious works of art.

Although the government was heavily criticised, the Pope noted: "Universally known is the fact that the Catholic Church is never bound to one form of government more than to another, provided the Divine rights of God and of Christian consciences are safe". The encyclical called the acts of the Spanish government an "offence not only to Religion and the Church, but also to those declared principles of civil liberty on which the new Spanish regime declares it bases itself".
