= Burning of convents in Spain (1931) =

Period of civil unrest

1931 burning of convents in Spain and riots
- Part of Prelude to the Spanish Civil War
- Arson attack on the Professed House of the Jesuits in Madrid, 1931
- Date: May 10 to 13, 1931
- Location: Second Spanish Republic
- Caused by: Anti-Catholicism
- Result: Several hundred Churches, convents and other religious buildings in Spain burned

Parties
Far-Left factions: Spanish anarchists; Anticlericalists	Spanish Catholics; Monarchists

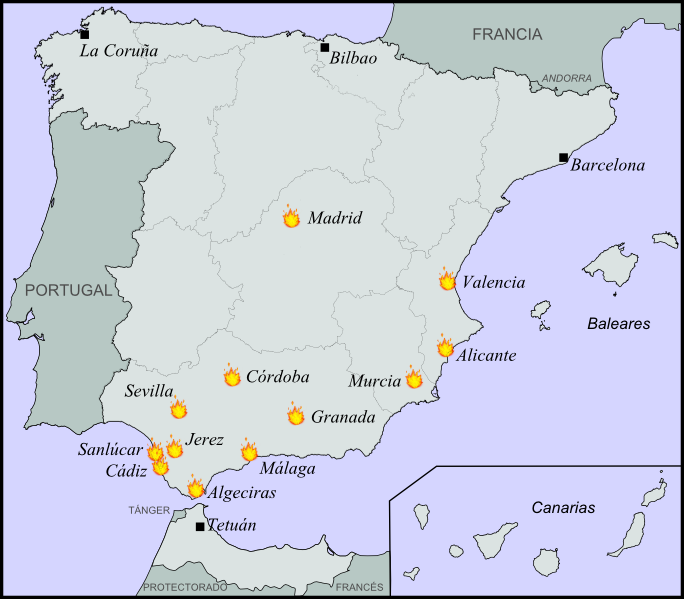
Locations of the burnings

Between May 10 and May 13, 1931, over one hundred convents and other religious buildings were deliberately burned down by anarchists and other Far Left anticlericalists in Spain during allegedly spontaneous riots that started in Madrid and spread throughout the country.

On May 10, a monarchist group played a recording of the former national anthem Marcha Real by an open window in the Calle de Alcalá while a large crowd were returning from the Buen Retiro Park. Some members of the crowd were enraged, and the following day anti-Catholic riots and Church arson swept across Spain. While some cabinet ministers in the newly founded Second Spanish Republic wanted to intervene and restore order, other cabinet ministers opposed the idea. According to the canonical narrative, Prime Minister Manuel Azaña allegedly overruled those who wished to intervene by stating, "All the convents of Spain are not worth the life of a single Republican".

== Legacy ==
Among the many works of Spain's cultural heritage that were lost during the 1931 arson attacks was the copy of Marko Marulić's De institutione bene vivendi per exempla sanctorum ("Instruction on How to Lead a Virtuous Life Based on the Examples of Saints") that once belonged to St Francis Xavier. It was the only book, aside from the Roman Breviary, that the early Jesuit carried with him and constantly re-read during his missionary work in Portuguese India. St. Francis Xavier's copy of the book had been returned to Spain after his death and was long treasured in Madrid as a second class relic by the Society of Jesus. Writing in 1961, however, Marulic scholar Ante Kadič announced that recent inquiries about the volume had come up empty and that he believed that the Saint's copy must have been destroyed during the May 1931 arson attack by Spanish Republicans against the Jesuit monastery in Madrid. According to Classicist Edward Mulholland, "It is estimated that the Jesuit Casa Profesa's library, which also burned, lost 80,000 volumes, including incunables and first editions of Spanish Golden Age authors like Lope de Vega, Calderón de la Barca, and Quevedo."
