= Background of the Spanish Civil War =

Causes of the Spanish Civil War

The long term causes of the Spanish Civil War date back to the end of the 19th century, when the owners of large estates, called latifundios, held most of the power in a land-based oligarchy. The landowners' power was unsuccessfully challenged by the industrial and merchant sectors. In 1868 popular uprisings led to the overthrow of Queen Isabella II of the House of Bourbon. In 1873 Isabella's replacement, King Amadeo I of the House of Savoy, abdicated due to increasing political pressure, and the short-lived First Spanish Republic was proclaimed. After the restoration of the Bourbons in December 1874, Carlists and anarchists emerged in opposition to the monarchy. Alejandro Lerroux helped bring republicanism to the fore in Catalonia, where poverty was particularly acute. Growing resentment of conscription and of the military culminated in the Tragic Week in Barcelona in 1909. After the First World War, the working class, the industrial class, and the military united in hopes of removing the corrupt central government, but were unsuccessful. Fears of communism grew. A military coup brought Miguel Primo de Rivera to power in 1923, and he ran Spain as a military dictatorship. Support for his regime gradually faded, and he resigned in January 1930. There was little support for the monarchy in the major cities, and King Alfonso XIII abdicated; the Second Spanish Republic was formed, whose power would remain until the culmination of the Spanish Civil War. Monarchists would continue to oppose the Republic.

The revolutionary committee headed by Niceto Alcalá-Zamora became the provisional government, with Zamora as the President and Head of State. The Republic had broad support from all segments of society; elections in June 1931 returned a large majority of Republicans and Socialists. With the onset of the Great Depression, the government attempted to assist rural Spain by instituting an eight-hour day and giving tenure to farm workers. Land reform and working conditions remained important issues throughout the lifetime of the Republic. Fascism remained a reactive threat, helped by controversial reforms to the military. In December a new reformist, liberal, and democratic constitution was declared. The constitution secularised the government, and this, coupled with their slowness to respond to a wave of anti-clerical violence prompted committed Catholics to become disillusioned with the incumbent coalition government. In October 1931, Manuel Azaña became Prime Minister of a minority government. The Right won the elections of 1933 following an unsuccessful uprising by General José Sanjurjo in August 1932, who would later lead the coup that started the civil war.

Events in the period following November 1933, called the "black biennium", seemed to make a civil war more likely. Alejandro Lerroux of the Radical Republican Party (RRP) formed a government with the support of CEDA and rolled back all major changes made under the previous administration, he also granted amnesty to General José Sanjurjo, who had attempted an unsuccessful coup in 1932. Some monarchists moved to the Fascist Falange Española to help achieve their aims. In response, the socialist party (PSOE) became more extreme, setting up a revolutionary committee and training the socialist youth in secret. Open violence occurred in the streets of Spanish cities and militancy continued to increase right up until the start of the civil war, reflecting a movement towards radical upheaval rather than peaceful democratic means as a solution to Spain's problems. In the last months of 1934, two government collapses brought members of the Spanish Confederation of the Autonomous Right (CEDA) into the government, making it more right-wing. Farm workers' wages were halved, and the military was purged of republican members and reformed. A Popular Front alliance was organised, which won the 1936 elections. Azaña led a weak minority government, but soon replaced Zamora as president in April. Prime Minister Casares failed to heed warnings of a military conspiracy involving several generals, who decided that the government had to be replaced if the dissolution of Spain was to be prevented. They organised a military coup in July, which started the Spanish Civil War.

== Constitutional monarchy ==
=== 19th century ===
The 19th century was a turbulent time for Spain. Those in favour of reforming the Spanish government vied for political power with conservatives who intended to prevent such reforms from being implemented. In a tradition that started with the Spanish Constitution of 1812, many liberals sought to curtail the authority of the Spanish monarchy as well as to establish a nation-state under their ideology and philosophy. The reforms of 1812 were short-lived as they were almost immediately overturned by King Ferdinand VII when he dissolved the aforementioned constitution. This ended the Trienio Liberal government. Twelve successful coups were eventually carried out in the sixty-year period between 1814 and 1874. There were several attempts to realign the political system to match social reality.

Until the 1850s, the economy of Spain was primarily based on agriculture. There was little development of a bourgeois industrial or commercial class. The land-based oligarchy remained powerful; a small number of people held large estates (called latifundia) as well as all of the important government positions. The landowners' power was challenged by the industrial and merchant sectors, largely unsuccessfully. In addition to these regime changes and hierarchies, there was a series of civil wars that transpired in Spain known as the Carlist Wars throughout the middle of the century. There were three such wars: the First Carlist War (1833–1840), the Second Carlist War (1846–1849), and the Third Carlist War (1872–1876). During these wars, a right-wing political movement known as Carlism fought to institute a monarchial dynasty under a different branch of the House of Bourbon that was predicated and descended upon Don Infante Carlos María Isidro of Molina.

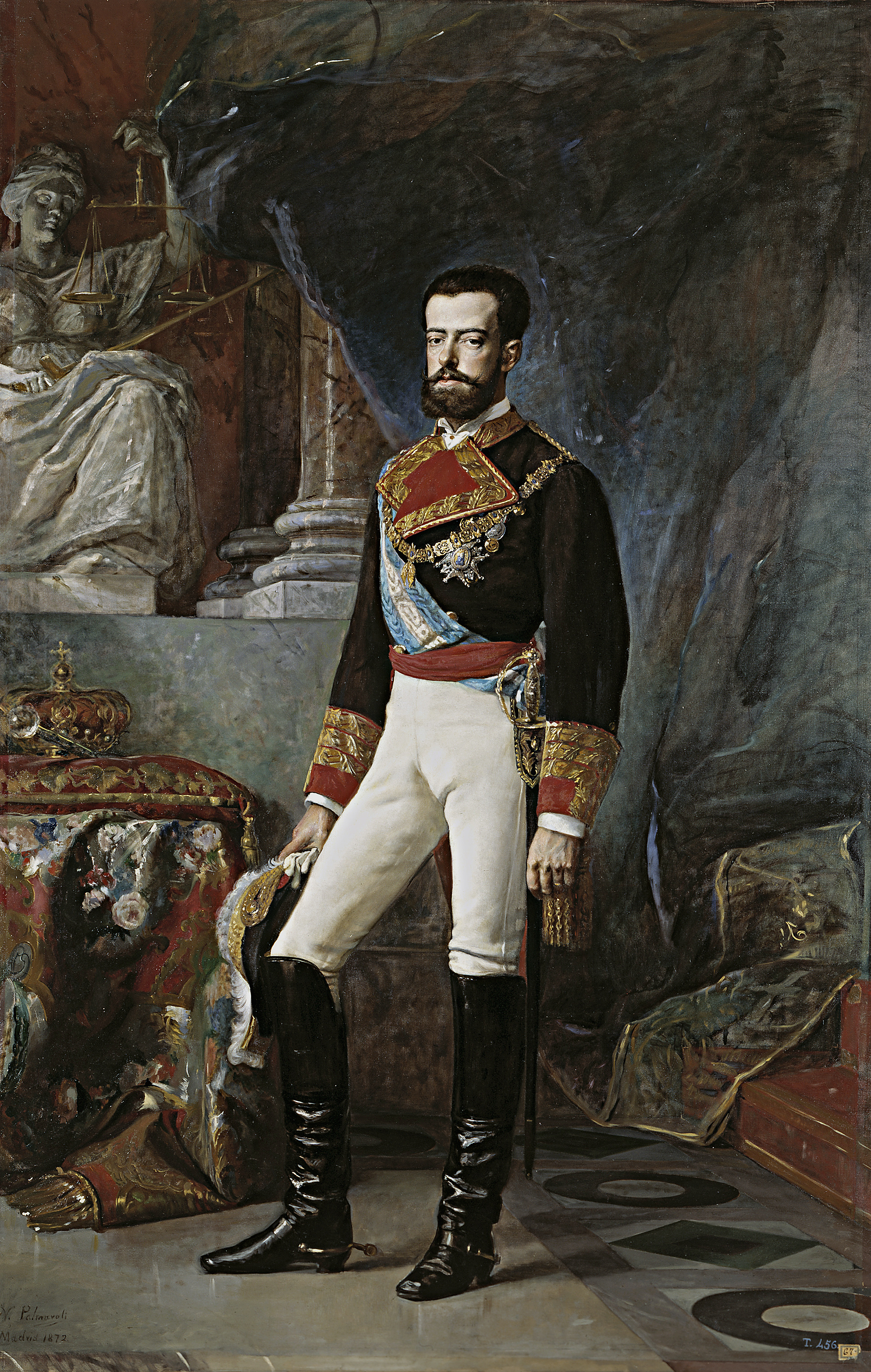
King Amadeo I of Spain

In 1868, popular uprisings led to the overthrow of Queen Isabella II of the House of Bourbon and her replacement with Amadeo I of the House of Savoy. Two distinct factors led to the uprisings: a series of urban riots, and a liberal movement within the middle classes and the military (led by General Joan Prim), who were concerned about the ultra-conservatism of the monarchy. In 1873 Amadeo I abdicated due to the assassination of Prime Minister Juan Prim, Amadeo's loss of legitimacy and increasing political pressure, resulting in the proclamation of the First Spanish Republic. However, the intellectuals behind the Republic were powerless to prevent a descent into chaos. Uprisings were crushed by the military, and eventually the Republic was overthrown by a coup d'état of General Arsenio Martínez Campos in 1874, leading to the restoration of the Bourbons under Alfonso XII. Despite the introduction of universal male suffrage in 1890, elections were controlled by local political bosses (caciques).

The most traditionalist sectors of the political sphere systematically tried to prevent liberal reforms and to sustain the patrilineal monarchy. The Carlists – supporters of Infante Carlos and his descendants – fought to promote Spanish tradition and Catholicism against the liberalism of successive Spanish governments. The Carlists attempted to restore the historic liberties and broad regional autonomy granted to the Basque Country and Catalonia by their fueros (regional charters). At times they allied with nationalists (separate from the National Faction during the civil war itself), including during the Carlist Wars.

Periodically, anarchism became popular among the working class, and was far stronger in Spain than anywhere else in Europe at the time. Anarchists were easily defeated in clashes with government forces.

=== 20th century ===
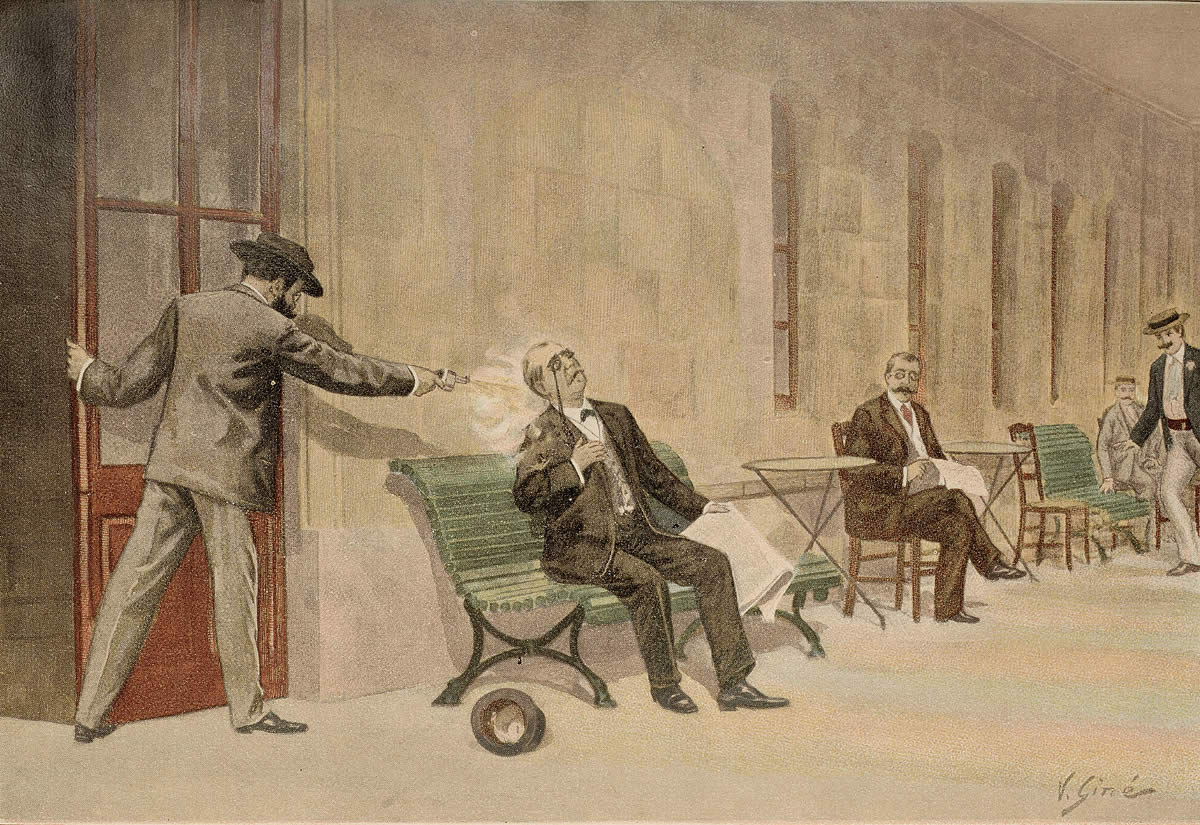
Michele Angiolillo kills Cánovas in a health resort in 1897

In 1897, an Italian anarchist assassinated Prime Minister Antonio Cánovas del Castillo, motivated by a growing number of arrests and the use of torture by the government. In 1898, the Spanish-American War began as Spain fought an ill-fated conflict against the United States over Spanish Caribbean territories, the Philippines and Samoa in response to Spanish repression of Cuban rebels. The war ended in a decisive American victory and the loss of Spain's empire in the Caribbean and the Pacific. Spain dubbed this defeat El Desastre del '98 (The Disaster of '98) because it was a death blow to the declining Spanish empire and its prestige within the European power system, and it led to the loss of key goods from colonies like Cuba. From that point on, Spain became a struggling power, weaker than other European nations. The loss of Spain's last valuable colony Cuba in the Spanish–American War of 1898 hit exports from Catalonia hardest; there were acts of terrorism and actions by agents provocateurs in Barcelona. In the first two decades of the 20th century, the industrial working class grew in number. There was a growing discontent in the Basque Country and Catalonia, where much of Spain's industry was based. They believed that the government favoured agrarianism and therefore failed to represent their interests. The average illiteracy rate was 64%, with considerable regional variation. Poverty in some areas was great and mass emigration to the New World occurred in the first decade of the century.

Spain's socialist party, the Spanish Socialist Workers' Party (Spanish: Partido Socialista Obrero Español, PSOE) and its associated trade union, the Unión General de Trabajadores (UGT), gained support. The UGT grew from 8,000 members in 1908 to 200,000 in 1920. Branch offices (Casas del pueblo) of the unions were established in major cities. The UGT was constantly fearful of losing ground to the anarchists. It was respected for its discipline during strikes. However, it was centrist and anti-Catalan, with only 10,000 members in Barcelona as late as 1936. The PSOE and the UGT were based on a simple form of Marxism, one that assumed an inevitable revolution, and were isolationist in character. When the UGT moved their headquarters from Barcelona to Madrid in 1899, many industrial workers in Catalonia were no longer able to access it. Some elements of the PSOE recognised the need for cooperation with republican parties. The right-wing movement of maurismo, distinctly featuring a growing authoritarian pulsion, coalesced in 1913. While largely discredited after 1923, it served as a breeding ground for the future ranks of the authoritarian right wing.

In 1912 the Reformist Party was founded, which attracted intellectuals. Figures like its leader, Alejandro Lerroux, helped attract wide support from the working class. His advocacy of anti-clericalism made him a successful demagogue in Barcelona. He argued that the Catholic Church was inseparable from the system of oppression the people were under. It was around this time that Spanish republicanism came to the fore.

The military was keen to avoid the break-up of the state and was increasingly inward-looking following its defeat in the Spanish-American War. Regional nationalism grew after the war's conclusion and was perceived as separatism by the military, leading to suppression. In 1905, the Spanish army attacked the headquarters of two satirical magazines in Catalonia believed to be undermining the government. To appease the military, the government outlawed negative comments about the military or Spain itself in the Spanish press. Resentment of the military and of conscription grew with the disastrous Rif War of 1909 in Spanish Morocco. Lerroux's support of the army's aims lost him support. Events culminated in the Tragic Week (Spanish: Semana Trágica) in Barcelona in 1909, when working class groups rioted against the call-up of reservists. 48 churches and similar institutions were burned in anti-clerical attacks. The riot was finally ended by the military; 1,725 members of such groups were put on trial, with five people sentenced to death. These events led to the establishment of the National Confederation of Labour (Spanish: Confederación Nacional del Trabajo, CNT), an anarchist-controlled trade union committed to anarcho-syndicalism. It had over a million members by 1923.

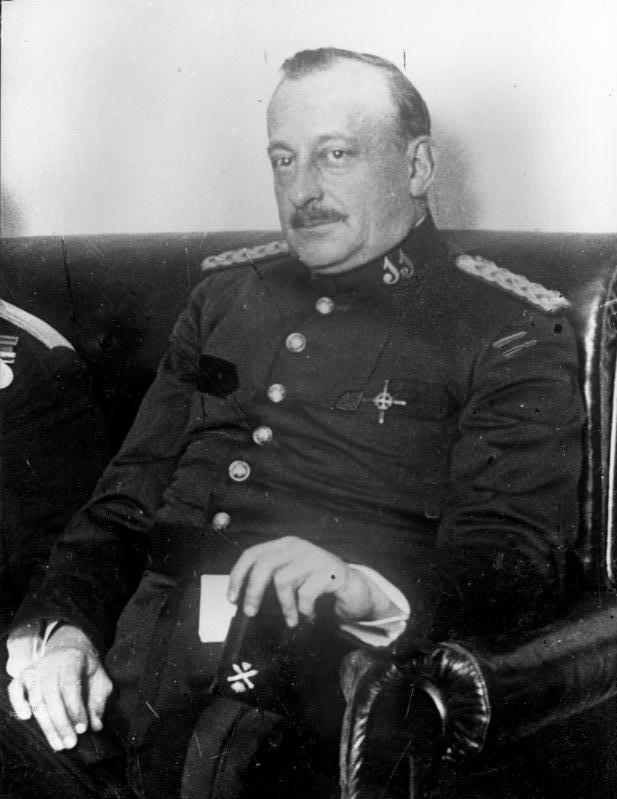
Prime Minister Miguel Primo de Rivera

During the First World War, Spain remained officially neutral and continued to trade with both the Entente and the Central Powers with segments of Spanish society divided between pro-German and pro-Allied sentiments. Increasing exports during this time led to a boom in industry and declining living standards in the industrial areas, particularly Catalonia and the Basque Country. There was high inflation. The industrial sector resented its subjugation by the agrarian central government. Along with concerns about antiquated promotion systems and political corruption, the war in Morocco had caused divisions in the military. Regenerationism became popular, and the working class, industrial class, and the military were united in their hope of removing the corrupt central government. However, these hopes were defeated in 1917 and 1918 when the various political parties representing these groups were either appeased or suppressed by the central government, one by one. The industrialists eventually backed the government as a way to restore order. After the formation of the Communist International in 1919, there was a growing fear of communism within Spain and growing repression on the part of the government through military means. The PSOE split, with the more left-wing members founding the Communist Party in 1921. The Restoration government failed to cope with an increasing number of strikes among the industrial workers in the north and the agricultural workers in the south.

Miguel Primo de Rivera came to power in a military coup in 1923 and ran Spain as a military dictatorship. He handed monopolistic control of trade union power to the UGT, and introduced a sweeping programme of public works. These public works were extremely wasteful, including hydroelectric dams and highways causing the deficit to double between 1925 and 1929. Spain's financial situation was made far worse by the pegging of the peseta to the gold standard and by 1931 the peseta had lost nearly half its value. The UGT was brought into the government to set up industrial arbitration boards, though this move was opposed by some in the group and was seen as opportunism by anarchist leaders. He also attempted to defend the agrarian–industrial monarchist coalition formed during the war. No significant reform to the political system (and in particular the monarchy) was instituted. This made forming a new government difficult, as existing problems had not been rectified. Gradually, his support faded because his personal approach to political life ensured he was personally held accountable for the government's failings, and due to an increasing frustration over his interference in economic matters he did not understand. José Calvo Sotelo, his finance minister, was one person to withdraw support, and de Rivera resigned in January 1930. There was little support for a return to the pre-1923 system, and the monarchy had lost credibility by backing the military government. Dámaso Berenguer was ordered by the king to form a replacement government, but his dictablanda dictatorship failed to provide a viable alternative. The choice of Berenguer annoyed another important general, José Sanjurjo, who believed himself to be a better choice. In the municipal elections of 12 April 1931, little support was shown for pro-monarchy parties in the major cities, and large numbers of people gathered in the streets of Madrid. King Alfonso XIII abdicated to prevent a "fratricidal civil war". (Note: His statement included the sentence "I am determined to have nothing to do with setting one of my countrymen against another in a fratricidal civil war." from Thomas (1961). pp. 18–19.) The Second Spanish Republic was formed.

== Second Republic ==
The Second Republic was a source of hope to the poorest in Spanish society and a threat to the richest, but had broad support from all segments of society. Niceto Alcalá-Zamora was the first prime minister of the Republic. The wealthier landowners and the middle class accepted the Republic because of the lack of any suitable alternative. Elections to a constituent Cortes in June 1931 returned a large majority of Republicans and Socialists, with the PSOE gaining 116 seats and Lerroux's Radical Party 94. Lerroux became foreign minister. The government was controlled by a Republican–Socialist coalition, whose members had differing objectives. Some more conservative members believed that the removal of the monarchy was enough by itself, but the Socialists and leftist Republicans demanded much wider reforms.

The state's financial position was poor. Supporters of the dictatorship attempted to block progress on reforming the economy. The redistribution of wealth supported by the new government seemed a threat to the richest, in light of the recent Wall Street crash and the onset of the Great Depression. The government attempted to tackle the dire poverty in rural areas by instituting an eight-hour day and giving the security of tenure to farm workers. Landlords complained. The effectiveness of the reforms was dependent on the skill of the local governance, which was often badly lacking. Changes to the military were needed and education reform was another problem facing the Republic. The relationship between central government and the Basque and Catalan regions also needed to be decided.

Effective opposition was led by three groups. The first group included Catholic movements such as the Asociación Católica de Propagandistas, (Note: See also: es:Asociación Católica de Propagandistas (in Spanish)) who had influence over the judiciary and the press. Rural landowners were told to think of the Republic as godless and communist. The second group consisted of organisations that had supported the monarchy, such as the Renovación Española and Carlists, who wished to see the new republic overthrown in a violent uprising. The third group were Fascist organisations, among them supporters of the dictator's son, José Antonio Primo de Rivera. Primo de Rivera was the most significant leader of fascism in Spain. The press often editorialised about a foreign Jewish–Masonic–Bolshevik plot. Members of the CNT willing to cooperate with the Republic were forced out, and it continued to oppose the government. The deeply unpopular Civil Guard (Spanish: Guardia Civil), founded in 1844, was charged with putting down revolts and was perceived as ruthless. Violence, including at Castilblanco in December 1931, was usual.

On 11 May 1931 rumours that a taxi driver was supposedly killed by monarchists sparked a wave of anti-clerical violence throughout south west urban Spain beginning. An angry crowd assaulted and burned ABC newspaper. The government's reluctance to declare martial law in response and a comment attributed to Azaña that he would "rather all the churches in Spain be burnt than a single Republican harmed" prompted many Catholics to believe that the Republic was trying to prosecute Christianity. Next day the Jesuit Church in the Calle de La Flor was also burned. Several other churches and convents were burned throughout the day. Over the next days some hundred churches were burned all over Spain. The government blamed the monarchists for sparking the riots and closed the ABC newspaper and El Debate.

Parties in opposition to Alcalá-Zamora's provisional government gained the support of the church and the military. The head of the church in Spain, Cardinal Pedro Segura, was particularly vocal in his disapproval. Until the 20th century, the Catholic Church had proved an essential part of Spain's character, although it had internal problems. Segura was expelled from Spain in June 1931. This prompted an outcry from the Catholic right, who cited oppression. The military were opposed to reorganisation, including an increase in regional autonomy granted by the central government, and reforms to improve efficiency were seen as a direct attack. Officers were retired and a thousand had their promotions reviewed, including Francisco Franco, who served as director of the General Military Academy in Zaragoza, which was closed by Manuel Azaña.

=== Constitution of 1931 ===
In October 1931 the conservative Catholic Republican prime-minister Alcalá-Zamora and the Interior Minister Miguel Maura resigned from the provisional government when the controversial articles 26 and 27 of the constitution, which strictly controlled Church property and prohibited religious orders from engaging in education were passed. During the debate held on 13 October, a night that Alcalá-Zamora considered the saddest night of his life, Azaña declared that Spain had "ceased to be Catholic"; although to an extent his statement was accurate, (Note: According to (Thomas 1961, p. 31), it was estimated that around two-thirds of Spaniards were not practising Catholics.) it was a politically unwise thing to say. Manuel Azaña became the new provisional Prime Minister. Desiring the job for himself, Lerroux became alienated, and his Radical Party switched to the opposition, leaving Azaña dependent on the Socialists for support. The Socialists, who favoured reform, objected to the lack of progress. The reforms that were made alienated the land-holding right. Conditions for labourers remained dreadful; the reforms had not been enforced. Rural landowners declared war on the government by refusing to plant crops. Meanwhile, several agricultural strikes were harshly put down by the authorities. Reforms, including the unsuccessful attempt to break up large holdings, failed to significantly improve the situation for rural workers. By the end of 1931, King Alfonso, in exile, stopped attempting to prevent an armed insurrection of monarchists in Spain, and was tried and condemned to life imprisonment in absentia.

A new constitution was approved on 9 December 1931. The first draft, prepared by Ángel Ossorio y Gallardo and others, was rejected, and a much more daring text creating a "democratic republic of workers of every class" was promulgated. It contained much in the way of emotive language and included many controversial articles, some of which were aimed at curbing the Catholic Church. The constitution was reformist, liberal, and democratic in nature, and was welcomed by the Republican–Socialist coalition. It appalled landowners, industrialists, the organised church, and army officers. At this point once the constituent assembly had fulfilled its mandate of approving a new constitution, it should have arranged for regular parliamentary elections and adjourned. However fearing the increasing popular opposition the Radical and Socialist majority postponed the regular elections, therefore prolonging their way in power for two more years. This way the provisional republican government of Manuel Azaña initiated numerous reforms to what in their view would "modernize" the country.

As the provisional government believed it was necessary to break the control the church had over Spanish affairs, the new constitution removed any special rights held by the Catholic Church. The constitution proclaimed religious freedom and a complete separation of Church and State. Catholic schools continued to operate, but outside the state system; in 1933 further legislation banned all monks and nuns from teaching. The Republic regulated church use of property and investments, provided for recovery and controls on the use of property the church had obtained during past dictatorships, and banned the Vatican-controlled Society of Jesus. The controversial articles 26 and 27 of the constitution strictly controlled Church property and prohibited religious orders from engaging in education. Supporters of the church and even Jose Ortega y Gasset, a liberal advocate of the separation of church and state, considered the articles overreaching. Other articles legalising divorce and initiating agrarian reforms were equally controversial, and on 13 October 1931, Gil Robles, the leading spokesman of the parliamentary right, called for a Catholic Spain to make its stand against the Republic. Commentator Stanley Payne has argued that "the Republic as a democratic constitutional regime was doomed from the outset", because the far left considered any moderation of the anticlerical aspects of the constitution as totally unacceptable.

Restrictions on Christian iconography in schools and hospitals and the ringing of bells came into force in January 1932. State control of cemeteries was also imposed. Many ordinary Catholics began to see the government as an enemy because of the educational and religious reforms. Government actions were denounced as barbaric, unjust, and corrupt by the press.

In August 1932 there was an unsuccessful uprising by General José Sanjurjo, who had been particularly appalled by events in Castilblanco. The aims of the insurrection were vague, and it quickly turned into a fiasco. Among the generals tried and sent to Spanish colonies were four men who would go on to distinguish themselves fighting against the Republic in the civil war: Francisco de Borbón y de la Torre, Duke of Seville, Martin Alonso, (Note: See also: es:Pablo Martín Alonso (in Spanish)) Ricardo Serrador Santés, and Heli Rolando de Tella y Cantos.

Azaña's government continued to ostracize the Church. The Jesuits who were in charge of the best schools throughout the country were banned and had all their property confiscated. The army was reduced. Landowners were expropriated. Home rule was granted to Catalonia, with a local parliament and a president of its own. In November 1932, Miguel de Unamuno, one of the most respected Spanish intellectuals, rector of the University of Salamanca, and himself a Republican, publicly raised his voice to protest. In a speech delivered on 27 November 1932, at the Madrid Ateneo, he protested: "Even the Inquisition was limited by certain legal guarantees. But now we have something worse: a police force which is grounded only on a general sense of panic and on the invention of non-existent dangers to cover up this over-stepping of the law." In June 1933 Pope Pius XI issued the encyclical Dilectissima Nobis, "On Oppression of the Church of Spain", raising his voice against the persecution of the Catholic Church in Spain.

The political left became fractured, while the right united. The Socialist Party continued to support Azaña but headed further to the political left. Gil Robles set up a new party, the Spanish Confederation of the Autonomous Right (Spanish: Confederatión Espanola de Derechas Autónomas, CEDA) to contest the 1933 election, and tacitly embraced Fascism. The right won an overwhelming victory, with the CEDA and the Radicals together winning 219 seats. (Note: Thomas (1961). p. 66. allocates 207 seats to the political right.) They had spent far more on their election campaign than the Socialists, who campaigned alone. The roughly 3,000 members of the Communist Party were at this point not significant.

=== The "black biennium" ===
Following the elections of November 1933, Spain entered a period called the "black biennium" (Spanish: bienio negro) by the left. The CEDA had won a plurality of seats, but not enough to form a majority. President Niceto Alcalá-Zamora declined to invite the leader of the most voted party, Gil Robles, to form a government, and instead invited the Radical Republican Party's Alejandro Lerroux to do so. Immediately after the election, the Socialists alleged electoral fraud; they had, according to the PSOE, needed twice as many votes as their opponents to win each seat. They identified the lack of unity in the left as another reason for their defeat. The Socialist opposition began to propagate a revolutionary ideal. Stanley Payne asserts that the left demanded the cancellation of the elections not because the elections were fraudulent but because in its view those that had won the elections did not share the republican ideals.

The government, with the backing of CEDA, set about removing price controls, selling state favours and monopolies, and removing the land reforms—to the landowners' considerable advantage. This created growing malnourishment in the south of Spain. The agrarian reforms, still in force, went tacitly unenforced. Radicals became more aggressive and conservatives turned to paramilitary and vigilante actions.

The first working class protest came from the anarchists on 8 December 1933, and was easily crushed by force in most of Spain; Zaragoza held out for four days before the Spanish Republican Army, employing tanks, stopped the uprising. The Socialists stepped up their revolutionary rhetoric, hoping to force Zamora to call new elections. Carlists and Alfonsist monarchists continued to prepare, with Carlists undergoing military drills in Navarre; they received the backing of Italian Prime Minister Benito Mussolini. Gil Robles struggled to control the CEDA's youth wing, which copied Germany and Italy's youth movements. Monarchists turned to the Fascist Falange Española, under the leadership of José Antonio Primo de Rivera, as a way to achieve their aims. Open violence occurred in the streets of Spanish cities. Official statistics state that 330 people were assassinated in addition to 213 failed attempts, and 1,511 people wounded in political violence. Those figures also indicate a total of 113 general strikes were called and 160 religious buildings were destroyed, typically by arson.

Lerroux resigned in April 1934, after President Zamora hesitated to sign an Amnesty Bill which let off the arrested members of the 1932 plot. He was replaced by Ricardo Samper. The Socialist Party ruptured over the question of whether or not to move towards Bolshevism. The youth wing, the Federation of Young Socialists (Spanish: Federación de Juventudes Socialistas), were particularly militant. The anarchists called a four-week strike in Zaragoza. Gil Robles' CEDA continued to mimic the German Nazi Party, staging a rally in March 1934, to shouts of "Jefe" ("Chief", after the Italian "Duce" used in support of Mussolini). Gil Robles used an anti-strike law to successfully provoke and break up unions one at a time, and attempted to undermine the republican government of the Esquerra in Catalonia, who were attempting to continue the republic's reforms. Efforts to remove local councils from socialist control prompted a general strike, which was brutally put down by Interior Minister Salazar Alonso, (Note: See also: es:Rafael Salazar Alonso (in Spanish)) with the arrest of four deputies and other significant breaches of articles 55 and 56 of the constitution. The Socialist Landworkers' Federation (Spanish: Federación Nacional da Trabajadores de la Tierra, FNTT), a trade union founded in 1930, was effectively prevented from operating until 1936.

On 26 September, the CEDA announced it would no longer support the RRP's minority government. It was replaced by an RRP cabinet, again led by Lerroux, that included three members of the CEDA. After a year of intense pressure, CEDA, who had more seats in parliament, was finally successful in forcing the acceptance of three ministries. As a reaction, the Socialists (PSOE) and Communists triggered an insurrection that they had been preparing for nine months. In Catalonia Lluís Companys (leader of the Republican Left of Catalonia and the President of the Generalitat of Catalonia) saw an opportunity in the general strike and declared Catalonia an independent state inside the federal republic of Spain; the Esquerra, however, refused to arm the populace, and the head of the military in Catalonia, Domingo Batet, (Note: See also: es:Domingo Batet (in Spanish)) charged with putting down the revolt, showed similar restraint. In response, Lluís Companys was arrested and Catalan autonomy was suspended.

The 1934 strike was unsuccessful in most of Spain. However, in Asturias in northern Spain, it developed into a bloody revolutionary uprising, trying to overthrow the legitimate democratic regime. Around 30,000 workers were called to arms in ten days. Armed with dynamite, rifles, carbines and light and heavy machine guns, the revolutionaries managed to take the whole province of Asturias committing numerous murders of policemen, clergymen and civilians and destroying religious buildings including churches, convents and part of the university at Oviedo. In the occupied areas the rebels officially declared the proletarian revolution and abolished regular money.

The war minister, Diego Hidalgo wanted General Franco to lead the troops. However, President Alcalá-Zamora, aware of Franco's monarchist sympathies, opted to send General López Ochoa to Asturias to lead the government forces; hoping that his reputation as a loyal Republican would minimize the bloodshed. Franco was put in informal command of the military effort against the revolt.

Government troops, some brought in from Spain's Army of Africa, killed men, women and children and carried out summary executions after the main cities of Asturias were retaken. About 1,000 workers were killed, with about 250 government soldiers left dead. Atrocities were carried out by both sides. The failed rising in Asturias marked the effective end of the Republic. Months of retaliation and repression followed; torture was used on political prisoners. Even moderate reformists within the CEDA became sidelined. The two generals in charge of the campaign, Franco and Manuel Goded Llopis, were seen as heroes. Azaña was unsuccessfully made out to be a revolutionary criminal by his right-wing opponents. Gil Robles once again prompted a cabinet collapse, and five positions in Lerroux's new government were conceded to CEDA, including one awarded to Gil Robles himself. Farm workers' wages were halved, and the military was purged of republican members and reformed. Those loyal to Robles were promoted, and Franco was made Chief of Staff. Stanley Payne believes that in the perspective of contemporary European history the repression of the 1934 revolution was relatively mild and that the key leaders of the rebellion were treated with leniency. There were no mass killings after the fighting was over as had been in the case of the suppression of the Paris Commune or the Russian 1905 revolution; all death sentences were commuted aside from two, army sergeant and deserter Diego Vásquez, who fought alongside the miners, and a worker known as "El Pichilatu" who had committed serial killings. Little effort was actually made to suppress the organisations that had carried out the insurrection, resulting in most being functional again by 1935. Support for fascism was minimal and did not increase, while civil liberties were restored in full by 1935, after which the revolutionaries had a generous opportunity to pursue power through electoral means.

With this rebellion against established political legitimate authority, the Socialists showed identical repudiation of representative institutional system that anarchists had practiced. The Spanish historian Salvador de Madariaga, an Azaña's supporter, and an exiled vocal opponent of Francisco Franco asserted that: "The uprising of 1934 is unforgivable. The argument that Mr Gil Robles tried to destroy the Constitution to establish fascism was, at once, hypocritical and false. With the rebellion of 1934, the Spanish left lost even the shadow of moral authority to condemn the rebellion of 1936" (Note: In the original: "El alzamiento de 1934 es imperdonable. La decisión del presidente de la República de llamar al poder a la CEDA era inatacable y hasta debida desde hacía ya tiempo. El argumento de que el señor Gil Robles intentaba destruir la Constitución para instaurar el fascismo era, a la vez, hipócrita y falso. ….. Con la rebelión de 1934, la izquierda española perdió hasta la sombra de autoridad para condenar la rebelión de 1936.")

In 1935 Azaña and Indalecio Prieto started to unify the left and to combat its extreme elements. They staged large, popular rallies of what would become the Popular Front. Lerroux's Radical government collapsed after two major scandals, the Straperlo and Nombela scandals. However, Zamora did not allow the CEDA to form a government, instead calling elections. The elections of 1936 were won by the Popular Front, with vastly smaller resources than the political right who followed Nazi propaganda techniques. The right began to plan how to best overthrow the Republic, rather than taking control of it.

The government was weak, and the influence of the revolutionary Largo Caballero prevented socialists from being part of the cabinet. The republicans were left to govern alone; Azaña led a minority government. Pacification and reconciliation would have been a huge task. Largo Caballero accepted support from the Communist Party (with a membership of around 10,000). Acts of violence and reprisals increased. By early 1936, Azaña found that the left was using its influence to circumvent the Republic and the constitution; they were adamant about increasingly radical changes. Parliament replaced Zamora with Azaña in April. Zamora's removal was made on specious grounds, using a constitutional technicality. Azaña and Prieto hoped that by holding the positions of Prime Minister and President, they could push through enough reforms to pacify the left and deal with right-wing militancy. However, Azaña was increasingly isolated from everyday politics; his replacement, Casares Quiroga, was weak. Although the right also voted for Zamora's removal, this was a watershed event which inspired conservatives to give up on parliamentary politics. Leon Trotsky wrote that Zamora had been Spain's "stable pole", and his removal was another step towards revolution. Largo Caballero held out for a collapse of the republican government, to be replaced with a socialist one as in France.

CEDA turned its campaign chest over to army plotter Emilio Mola. Monarchist José Calvo Sotelo replaced CEDA's Gil Robles as the right's leading spokesman in parliament. The Falange expanded rapidly, and many members of the Juventudes de Acción Popular joined. They successfully created a sense of militancy on the streets to try to justify an authoritarian regime. Prieto did his best to avoid revolution by promoting a series of public works and civil order reforms, including of parts of the military and civil guard. Largo Caballero took a different attitude, continuing to preach of an inevitable overthrow of society by the workers. Largo Caballero also disagreed with Prieto's idea of a new Republican–Socialist coalition. With Largo Caballero's acquiescence, communists alarmed the middle classes by quickly taking over the ranks of socialist organisations. This alarmed the middle classes. The division of the Popular Front prevented the government from using its power to prevent right-wing militancy. The CEDA came under attack from the Falange, and Prieto's attempts at moderate reform were attacked by the Socialist Youth. Sotelo continued to do his best to make conciliation impossible. Casares failed to heed Prieto's warnings of a military conspiracy involving several generals who disliked professional politicians and wanted to replace the government to prevent the dissolution of Spain. The military coup of July that started the Spanish Civil War was devised with Mola as director and Sanjurjo as a figurehead leader.

== See also ==
- Revisionism (Spain)

== Sources ==
=== Books ===
- Beevor, Antony (2006). The Battle for Spain: The Spanish Civil War 1936–1939. London: Weidenfeld & Nicolson. ISBN 978-0-297-84832-5.
- Casanova, Julián (2010). The Spanish Republic and Civil War. Cambridge University Press.
- Gibbs, Jack (1973). The Spanish Civil War. Benn's Twentieth-Century Histories. London: Ernest Benn. ISBN 978-0-510-17809-3.
- Hayes, Carlton J.H. (1951). The United States and Spain. An Interpretation. Sheed & Ward; 1st ed. ASIN B0014JCVS0.
- Fraser, Ronald (1979). Blood of Spain. London: Allen Lane. ISBN 978-0-7126-6014-3.
- Lannon, Frances (1987). Privilege, Persecution, and Prophecy: The Catholic Church in Spain, 1875–1975. Oxford: Clarendon Press. ISBN 978-0-19-821923-1.
- Payne, Stanley G. (1973). "25: The Second Spanish Republic". A History of Spain and Portugal (Print Edition). Library of Iberian Resources Online. Vol. 2. Madison: University of Wisconsin Press. ISBN 978-0-299-06280-4. Archived from the original on 18 February 2019.
- Payne, Stanley G (2006). The collapse of the Spanish Republic, 1933–1936 : origins of the Civil War. Yale University Press. ISBN 978-0300110654.
- Payne, Stanley G. (2004). The Spanish Civil War, the Soviet Union, and Communism. Yale University Press. ISBN 978-0300100686. JSTOR j.ctt1npgf9.
- Payne, Stanley G. (2012). The Spanish Civil War. Cambridge University Press. ISBN 978-0-521-17470-1. Archived from the original on 24 February 2021.
- Payne, Stanley G.; Palacios, Jesús (2014). Franco: A Personal and Political Biography (1st ed.). University of Wisconsin Press.
- Payne, Stanley G.; Palacios, Jesús (2018). Franco: A Personal and Political Biography (4th ed.). University of Wisconsin Press. ISBN 978-0299302146.
- Preston, Paul (2006). The Spanish Civil War: Reaction, Revolution and Revenge (3rd ed.). London: HarperCollins. ISBN 978-0-00-723207-9.
- Preston, Paul (2012). Franco. HarperCollins. ISBN 978-0007404230.
- Smith, Angel (2009). Historical Dictionary of Spain. Lanham, Md: Scarecrow Press. ISBN 978-0-8108-5849-7. Archived from the original on 19 January 2023.
- Thomas, Hugh (1961). The Spanish Civil War (1st ed.). London: Eyre and Spottiswoode. OCLC 395987.
- Thomas, Hugh (2001). The Spanish Civil War. Random House. ISBN 978-0375755156.
- Thomas, Hugh (2013). The Spanish Civil War. Penguin UK. ISBN 978-0-7181-9293-8.
- Vincent, Mary (2007). Spain, 1833–2002. Oxford, UK; New York: Oxford University Press. ISBN 978-0-19-873159-7.

=== Journals ===
- Brincat, Leo (4 November 2005). "Need for international condemnation of the Franco regime". Documents: working papers, 2006 ordinary session (first part) (Report). Council of Europe. ISBN 978-92-871-5932-8. Document 10737.
- Paz, Jose Antonio Souto (1 January 2001). "Perspectives on religious freedom in Spain". Brigham Young University Law Review. Provo, Utah: Brigham Young University. OCLC 94892517. Archived from the original on 17 November 2010.
- Preston, Paul (May 1999). "Franco and Azaña". History Today. 49 (5). London: History Today Ltd. OCLC 95360332.
- Trotsky, Leon (1936). "The Task in Spain". New International. 5 (4). New York: Marxists Internet Archive. Archived from the original on 25 August 2011.
