= Madariaga =

Madariaga is a Basque surname. It is derived from word madari (Basque for pear) Notable people with the surname include:

- Ander Madariaga (born 2002), sometimes known as Mada, Spanish footballer
- Joaquín Madariaga (1799–1848), soldier and Argentine politician
- José Madariaga (born 1968), Mexican equestrian
- José Cortés de Madariaga (1766–1826), South American patriot
- Joaquín Madariaga (1799 –1848), Argentine politician, brother of Juan
- Juan Madariaga (1809–1879), Argentine general who participated in the civil wars of the 19th century, brother of Joaquín
- Julen Madariaga (1932–2021), Basque Spanish politician and lawyer who co-founded the Basque armed separatist group ETA in 1959
- Modesto Madariaga (1904–1974), Spanish aviation mechanic
- Mónica Madariaga (1942–2009), Chilean lawyer, academic, and politician
- Nieves de Madariaga or Nieves Mathews (1917–2003), author of Scottish and Spanish parentage
- Salvador de Madariaga (1886–1978), Spanish diplomat, writer, historian and pacifist
  - Isabel de Madariaga (1919–2014), British historian, daughter of Salvador
  - María Rosa de Madariaga (1937–2022), Spanish historian and translator, niece of Salvador

== See also ==
- Madariaga – College of Europe Foundation, affiliated with the College of Europe
- General Juan Madariaga, town in Buenos Aires Province, Argentina
- General Madariaga Partido, partido located on the Atlantic coast of Buenos Aires Province in Argentina
- Madara (disambiguation)
- Madari
- Madaria
- Maradiaga
