= Rafael Salazar Alonso =

Spanish lawyer, newspaper proprietor and politician

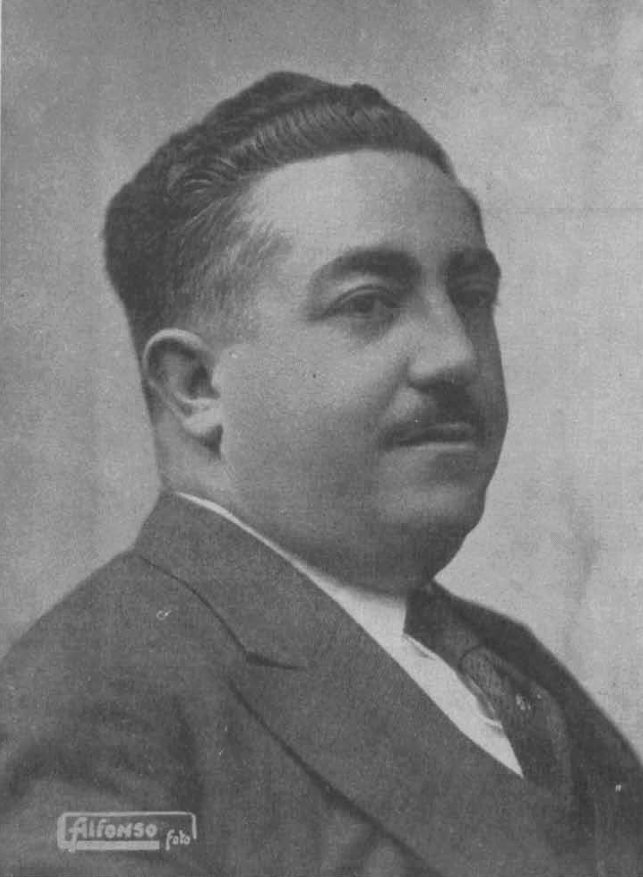
Rafael Salazar Alonso

Rafael Salazar Alonso (27 December 1895 - 23 September 1936) was a Spanish lawyer, newspaper proprietor and politician who engaged in left-wing and right-wing politics. He was the mayor of Madrid and a government minister. He was executed by the Republican authorities two months after the Spanish Civil War started.

== Biography ==
He was born in Madrid on 27 December 1895. His father was a hairdresser. He was active in left-wing republican groups from a young age. He was combative and, initially, anti-Catholic. In his father's home town of Siruela, he married the daughter of a rich local landowner. They had a daughter, Carmencita. While funding himself through work, he completed a law degree at the Universidad Complutense in Madrid doing some work as a lawyer and a journalist, later joining the Partido Republicano Radical (PRR) (Radical Republican Party) of Alejandro Lerroux García. The PRR had gradually split and Lerroux's faction had increasingly aligned itself with centre-right, nationalist and religious parliamentary groups. Salazar Alonso had also become a freemason, using the name Pi y Margall. He became editor of the newspaper El Sol and at different times owner or chief of several others, including Informaciones in Madrid and Almadén published in the municipality of that name. In 1931, he was elected as a city councillor for Madrid (as part of the Conjunción Republicano-Socialista, a coalition between republican parties and the Spanish Socialist Workers Party) and was president of the provincial council.

=== In parliament ===
Between 1931 and 1936, he represented Badajoz in parliament. On 11 February 1933, he helped found the Association of Friends of the Soviet Union (an earlier organisation with a similar name was created in 1925). On 23 April, during a protest by communists and socialists in Hornachos, he was accosted by the Anti-Marxist Coalition. He drove to Villafranca de los Barros to access a telephone to seek authority from the Ministro de la Gobernación, Santiago Casares Quiroga, for the Guardia Civil to open fire. Five people were killed and fourteen wounded. Forty were arrested and several beaten. During the trip to Villafranca de los Barrios, he met a new lover and confidante, Amparo Munilla, the wife of another rich landowner. He left his wife and children and, through his lover's influence, gave up freemasonry and practiced Roman Catholicism. In the elections of November 1933, he laced criticisms of his popular socialist opponent in Badajoz - the writer, translator and art expert María Teresa Lea Nelken y Mansberger, known as Margarita Nelken - with sexual insults and allegedly organised the release of a local thug from jail to deliver beatings to her and another socialist candidate, lawyer Juan Simeón Vidarte y Franco Romero and another popular candidate, physician and anarchist Dr. Pedro Vallina. In March the following year, Salazar Alonso himself became Minister of the Interior (until October). Immediately upon his tenure, he declared a state of emergency, banning the Juventudes Socialistas de España, the Communist Party of Spain and the Confederación Nacional del Trabajo and told the heads of security forces to be firm in their actions. He described a strike by Unión General de Trabajadores (UGT) unions protesting at government's reversionary measures against agrarian reform as "revolutionary" and ordered its prohibition. Government repression followed, including the banning of unionism overseen by the Federación Nacional de Trabajadores de la Tierra (FNTT) (land-workers' union). With the help of security forces, caciques - local land-owning political influencers - and cronies, he ejected nearly two hundred socialist mayors and their councilors on weak legal pretexts and replaced them with right-wing supporters, thus removing the last available local protection for landless peasants from actions of the caciques or the police. He declared the harvest as a national public service, strike plans made by the FNTT as revolutionary and imposed severe press censorship. In the Cortes, the actions were condemned as unconstitutional and Salazar Alonso's efforts to frustrate any compromise was highlighted; subsequently, he became a hate-figure for the left-wing and unions, but his actions were part of a deliberate provocation to stoke the anger of the left, with the support of his colleague José María Gil-Robles y Quiñones. Because of the revolutionary events of October 1934, particularly in Catalonia and Asturias, he was made mayor of Madrid on 19 October, remaining in the post for one year. In June 1935, socialist diputado Pedro Rubio Heredia, a popular activist for the peasants of Badajoz, was shot dead in a restaurant by Regino Valencia, a political fixer who worked for Salazar Alonso. Valencia was sentenced to twelve years in prison but Salazar Alonso was widely regarded as the author of the crime. He defended Valencia at his appeal in December 1935 at the Tribunal Supremo). Juan Simeón Vidarte, acting for the victim's family, caused a scene by saying Salazar Alonso should be wearing the convict's overalls, not lawyer's robes.

=== Collapse of political career ===
From the end of 1934, Salazar Alonso was involved in a gambling scandal with a rigged version of roulette game, which came to be called Straperlo or Estraperlo. The game had previously been banned in the Netherlands, but a Spanish patent was granted for it to Daniel Strauss - its named 'inventor' - in December 1934. The fallout effectively ended the career of Salazar Alonso and permanently damaged his Party. He and other prominent Radical personalities had been bribed to legalise usage of the roulette wheel in casinos. He received 100,000 pesetas and a gold watch. Unhappy with his pay off, he organised a police raid on the occasion of wheel's opening at the San Sebastián casino. Another game was opened in Pollença but was stopped shortly afterwards after complaints made to José Maria Gil Robles. Strauss left Spain but sent a letter to Lerroux implicating him and others and asking for money. Lerroux ignored the letter but his political opponents received a copy to show to president Niceto Alcalá-Zamora. With the support of the right-wing coalition, the Confederación Española de Derechas Autónomas (CEDA), he barely survived a vote after a debate in the Cortes (October 1934). He resigned as mayor of Madrid. He was removed from the cabinet because Lerroux thought having three CEDA cabinet ministers would not be approved by president Zamora and would be a political touch-paper for the left. A humiliated Salazar Alonso walked out of the Cortes when, in a further debate about the bloody uprisings and their repression in Asturias and Catalonia, Ricardo Samper Ibáñez, former Presidente del Consejo de Ministros and Ministro de Estado (president of the council of ministers and minister of state) said that Salazar Alonso was to blame for the events. Then, throughout election campaigning in Badajoz, he fielded vocal remarks about his profits from Estraperlo and failed to get elected, even afterwards claiming electoral irregularities. In April 1936, he became president of the right-wing newspaper Informaciones.

=== Trial and execution ===
At the beginning of the Spanish Civil War he went into hiding, firstly in the Portuguese Embassy, and then at the house of a friend called Cámara. A communist group arrested his wife - whom he was divorcing - and daughter. His wife provided Cámara's address but he'd left. He hid in the flat of an ex-lover, Irene Más, who was taking refuge with her family in the Palacio de Viana under the control of Melchor Rodriguez. Más asked a neighbour to put him up, but her angry husband arranged for him to surrender to Rodriguez. On 31 August 1936, he was arrested by Rodriguez's staff, by whom he was treated well. Anarchosyndicalist Eduardo Val Bescós sent anarchists to interrogate him, but they also wanted to kill him. Rodriguez agreed to his suggestion to hand him to the government. He was held in the Cárcel Modelo and was visited only by lawyers, Aurelio Núñez Morgado (the Chilean Ambassador) and daily by Munilla (who had earlier ignored threats to reveal his whereabouts, was detained for a week along with a baby son and a daughter and released on 14 August). Munilla and her family were sheltered by Norwegian diplomats. On 19 September, Salazar Alonso stood accused of being part of the Francoist military plot. The experience tribunal magistrate, Mariano Gómez, was a moderate Republican. The prosecution showed he had provoked the Asturian uprising but admitted having no evidence of his implication in the plot. Munilla came to court to speak on his behalf. On September 22, 1936, he was sentenced to death for his alleged participation in the military uprising. President Manuel Azaña condemned the sentence. After it was passed to the cabinet, they voted 7:6 in favour of commuting the sentence to life imprisonment and socialist Indalecio Prieto elaborated on this. However, Mariano Gómez then spoke to Prieto explaining his fear that allowing him to live would lead to a revolt in which the remaining 100 or so prisoners would be killed. Prieto told the cabinet this and changed his vote. Salazar Alonso was executed the following day.
