= Isabel de Madariaga =

British historian (1919–2014)

- Born: Isabel Margaret de Madariaga; 27 August 1919; Hillhead, Glasgow, Scotland
- Died: 16 June 2014 (aged 94); London Borough of Camden, London, England
- Education: School of Slavonic and East European Studies
- Spouse: Leonard Schapiro (m. 1943; div. 1976)
- Scientific career
- Fields: History
- Workplaces: University of Sussex; Lancaster University; School of Slavonic and East European Studies
- Notable students: Janet M. Hartley, Pia Pera

Isabel Margaret de Madariaga (27 August 1919 – 16 June 2014) was a British historian who specialised on Russia in the 18th century and Catherine the Great. She published six books on Russia and is credited for changing the perception of Catherine the Great amongst Russian and Western scholars. Born to a Spanish diplomat and a Scottish economic historian, she was taught at 16 schools during her childhood and earned a first-class honours degree in Russian language and literature at the School of Slavonic and East European Studies (SSEES). De Madariaga worked for BBC Monitoring in the Second World War, and was a civil servant at the Ministry of Information and HM Treasury. She held a series of part-time posts at the London School of Economics, was secretary on the editorial board of The Slavonic and East European Review, co-founded the Government and Opposition journal's editorial board and was a lecturer at the University of Sussex, Lancaster University and the SSEES.

== Early life and career ==
De Madariaga was born at 7 Park Circus Place in Hillhead, Glasgow on 27 August 1919. She was the younger daughter of the Spanish diplomat and writer Salvador de Madariaga and the Scottish economic historian Constance Helen Margaret (née Archibald). Her elder sister was the writer Nieves Mathews. As a consequence of her father's career, De Madariaga lived in Geneva during her early years because he was working for the League of Nations before he moved to Paris to be the United States ambassador for the Spanish republic. She was taught at sixteen different schools, including Miss Woods's school in Headington, the International School of Geneva and Instituto-Escuela in Madrid.

She learnt to play the piano in the ballroom of the Spanish Embassy and met a wide variety of cultured individuals such as Maurice Ravel. This made De Madariaga passionate about music and she was fluent in English, French, German, Italian, Russian and Spanish. Her family was forced to move to the United Kingdom after the Spanish Civil War began in 1936. At the age of 18, De Madariaga went to London and was the first woman undergraduate student to enroll on a Russian language and literature degree at the School of Slavonic and East European Studies (SSESS). She earned first-class honours in 1940 and the John Marshall Prize. The outbreak of the Second World War disrupted her studying and Da Madariaga was evacuated to Oxford.

Because she was a polyglot, the BBC employed her to work as a monitor of enemy broadcasts for BBC Monitoring in Evesham from 1940 to 1943. De Madariaga was reticent to talk about her wartime work, and found her job to be instructive and liberating. She later moved to London to work as a temporary civil servant at the Ministry of Information and later at HM Treasury's economic information unit between 1947 and 1948. Due to De Madariaga being married, she found it difficult to forge a career in academia and held a series of part-time positions at the London School of Economics. She did research for her husband and the University College London professor Mark A. Thompson.

De Madariaga was secretary on the editorial board of The Slavonic and East European Review from 1951 to 1964, a post that allowed her to do part-time research, and earned a Doctor of Philosophy for a two-volume dissertation, on Anglo-Russian relations during the American Revolutionary War. It was published as Britain, Russia and the Armed Neutrality of 1780: Sir James Harris’s Mission to St Petersburg during the American Revolution in 1962 and provided a greater insight into Russian court politics. In 1965, De Madariaga was a co-founder of the editorial board of the Government and Opposition journal and wrote substantial reviews for it.

Because she resided in Highgate, she lectured at the University of Sussex from 1966 to 1968 and then the Lancaster University between 1968 and 1971. De Madariaga worked with the multi disciplinary Study Group on Eighteenth-Century Russia from 1968 on. Her second book was co-written by Ghiță Ionescu in 1968 and called Opposition, Past and Present of a Political Institution. Three years later, she returned to the SSESS to be appointed a reader in Russian studies and remained in the post until 1981. De Madariaga published her third book Russia in the Age of Catherine the Great in 1981 that compiled previously published research without access to archives in Russia on Catherine the Great's reign of Russia from 1762 to 1796 with regards to the development of education, intellectual thought, law and serfdom. It was republished as Catherine the Great: A Short History and translated into Russian in 2002.

In 1982, the SSESS promoted her to emeritus professor of Russian Studies. Few research students studied under De Madariaga by the time she retired in 1984 and notable ones included Janet M. Hartley and Pia Pera. She had helped to establish the Russian Studies course, was chairperson of its Academic Assembly and served as a member of its Council when it was under threat of closure. De Madariaga was elected as a fellow of the British Academy in 1990 and was made a corresponding member of the Real Academia de la Historia a year later. The Dissolution of the Soviet Union at the end of 1991 allowed her works to be published in Russia and to be used by the country's historians. She compiled 13 essays to form a 1998 collection called Politics and Culture in Eighteenth-Century Russia. Her final book Ivan the Terrible: First Tsar of Russia was published in 2005.

== Private life ==
De Madariaga was married to the barrister and historian Leonard Schapiro from 15 March 1943 to 1976. There were no children of the marriage. A fall at her house in mid-2014 resulted in her being hospitalised. After a series of operations, which did not bring about an improvement in her condition, De Madariaga died of bronchopneumonia at the Royal Free Hospital, London Borough of Camden on 16 June 2014. She was survived by a nephew and a niece.

== Personality and legacy ==
She was given the nickname "Lolita" in her childhood years as she was reserved and intimidating. According to Hamish Scott in her obituary in The Guardian, De Madariaga's "shyness and lack of self-confidence manifested themselves in an imposing, austere and intimidating public manner." He noted recognition in the professional field led her to become more kind and more interested in individuals and assisted fellow specialists: "The determination that had enabled her eventually to become a full-time academic also sustained her intellectual curiosity long into old age."

De Madariaga was credited for transforming the study of Russia in the 18th century and had changed perception on how Catherine the Great and Ivan the Terrible were viewed by scholars and Russian and Western historians. Before her works were published, little attention had been focused on Catherine's achievements on wanting Russia to "take her rightful place as a civilised member of the family of European great powers" while under various constraints during her reign, and more on her private life.
