= 2000s in Togo =

March 2000 passed without presidential action. New legislative elections were ultimately rescheduled for October 2001. Because of funding problems and disagreements between the government and opposition, the elections were again delayed, this time until March 2002.

In May 2002 the government scrapped CENI, blaming the opposition for its inability to function. In its stead, the government appointed seven magistrates to oversee preparations for legislative elections. Not surprisingly, the opposition announced it would boycott them. Held in October, as a result of the opposition’s boycott the government party won more than two-thirds of the seats in the National Assembly. In December 2002, Eyadéma's government used this rubber-stamp parliament to amend Togo’s constitution, allowing President Eyadéma to run for an “unlimited” number of terms. A further amendment stated that candidates must reside in the country for at least 12 months before an election, a provision that barred the participation in the upcoming presidential election of popular Union des Forces du Progrès (UFC) candidate, Gilchrist Olympio, who had been in exile since 1992. The presidential election was held June 1. President Eyadéma was re-elected with 57% of the votes, amid allegations of widespread vote rigging.

== Death of Eyadéma and Gnassingbé's rise ==
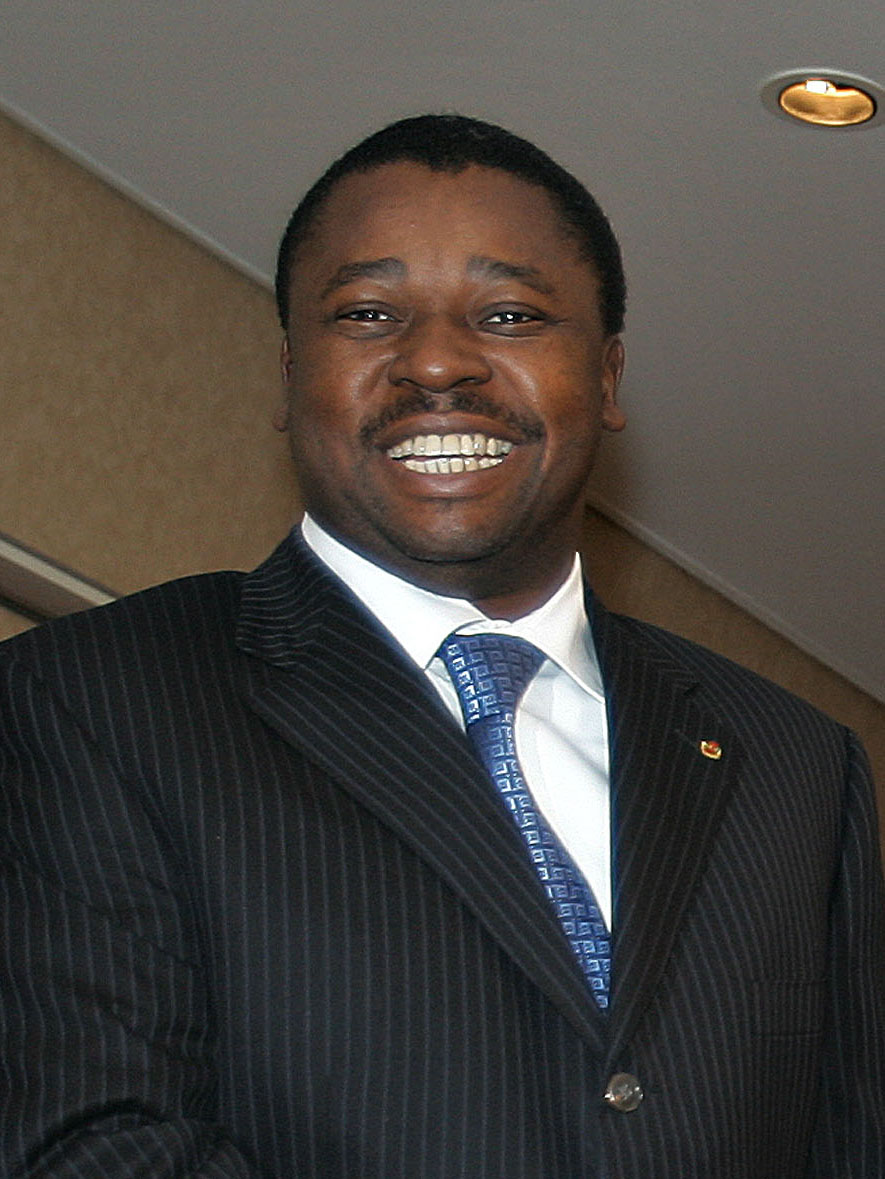
Faure Gnassingbé

President Eyadéma died on February 5, 2005, while on board an airplane en route to France for treatment for a heart attack. His son Faure Gnassingbé, the country's former minister of public works, mines, and telecommunications, was named president by Togo's military following the announcement of his father's death. Under international pressure from the African Union and the United Nations however, who both denounced the transfer of power from father to son as a coup, Gnassingbé was forced to step down on February 25, 2005, shortly after accepting the nomination to run for elections in April. Deputy Speaker Bonfoh Abbass was appointed interim president until the inauguration of the April 24 election winner. As to official results, the winner of the election was Gnassingbé who garnered 60% of the vote. Opposition leader Emmanuel Bob-Akitani however disputed the election and declared himself to be the winner with 70% of the vote. After the announcement of the results, tensions flared up and to date, 100 people have been killed. On May 3, 2005, Gnassingbé was sworn in and vowed to concentrate on "the promotion of development, the common good, peace and national unity".

In August 2006 President Gnassingbe and members of the opposition signed the Global Political Agreement (GPA), bringing an end to the political crisis triggered by Gnassingbe Eyadema's death in February 2005 and the flawed and violent electoral process that followed. The GPA provided for a transitional unity government whose primary purpose would be to prepare for benchmark legislative elections, originally scheduled for June 24, 2007. CAR opposition party leader and human rights lawyer Yawovi Agboyibo was appointed Prime Minister of the transitional government in September 2006. Leopold Gnininvi, president of the CDPA party, was appointed minister of state for mines and energy. The third opposition party, UFC, headed by Gilchrist Olympio, declined to join the government, but agreed to participate in the national electoral commission and the National Dialogue follow-up committee, chaired by Burkina Faso President Blaise Compaore.

Parliamentary elections are set to take place on October 14, 2007, and Olympio, who has returned from exile to campaign, is taking part for the first time in 17 years. More than 3,000 national and international observers are monitoring the poll.
