= Straperlo =

Scandal during the Second Spanish Republic

Straperlo was a scheme which originated in the Netherlands in the 1930s and was then introduced in Spain. In essence it was a fraudulent roulette which could be controlled electrically with the push of a button. The ensuing scandal was one of the several causes of the fall of the Republican government and the polarization of the parliament, which finally led to the Spanish Civil War (1936–1939).

== Name ==
The name had its origin in the names of the Dutch partners, one of whom was Daniel Strauss, but sources differ on the exact name or names of the others. Some sources say that there was just one other, called Jules Perel. Others state that there was a third female partner, Lowann, the wife of Strauss, but Paul Preston holds Perlowitz as the second partner. According to other sources, the name was in reference to the roulette machines (extra pearl).

== Scandal ==
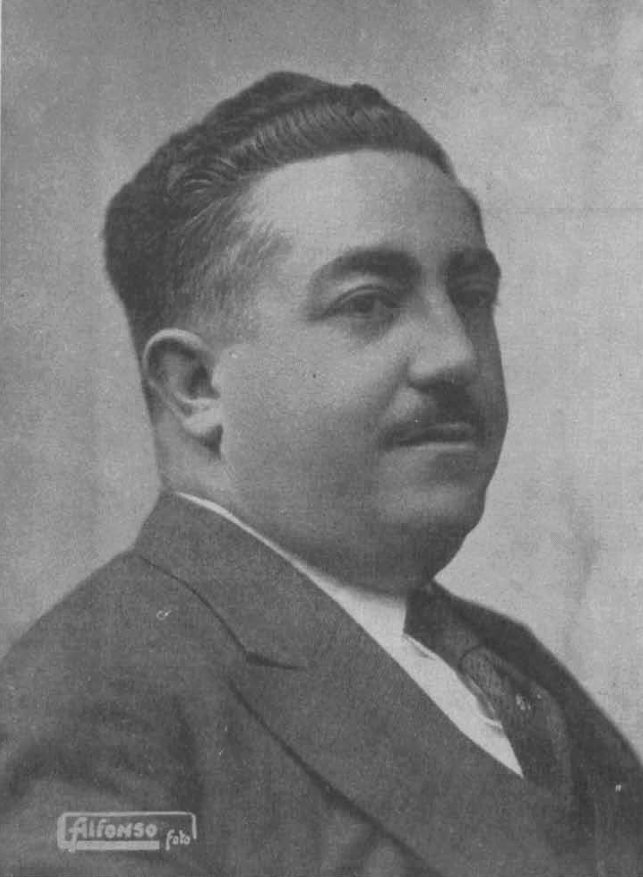
Rafael Salazar Alonso in 1934

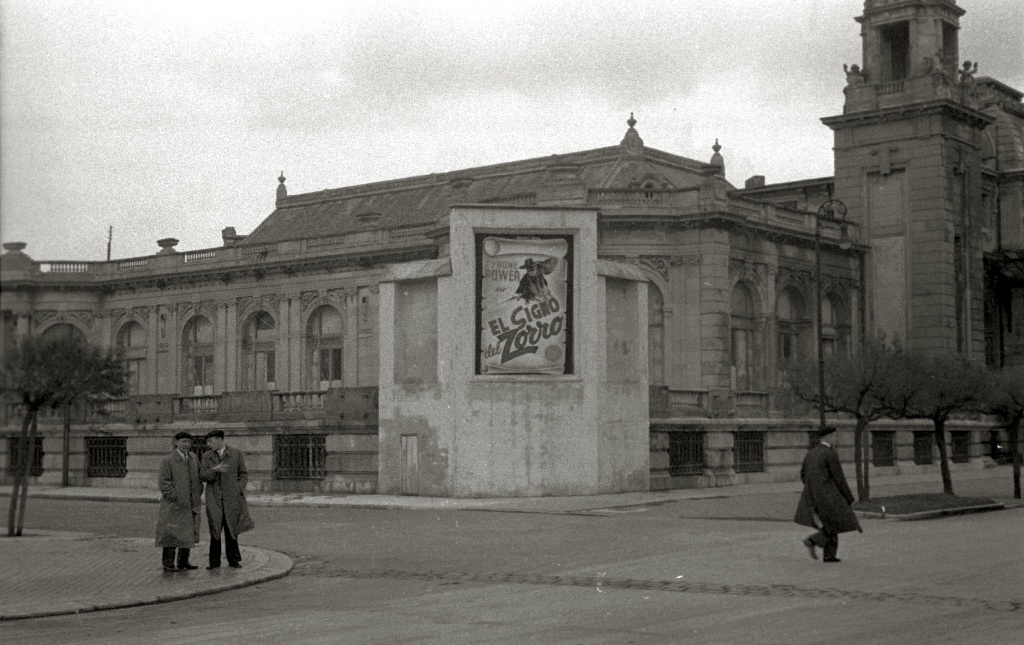
Partial view of the Kursaal Casino in San Sebastián

In the Netherlands, Straperlo had been introduced at the Kurhaus in Scheveningen in June 1933. By October 1933, it had been banned by the Dutch Ministry of Justice.

In 1934, Rafael Salazar Alonso was the conservative Minister of Interior in Spain. He was one of several prominent Radical Republican Party figures to accept bribes in order to legalize the fixed roulette. He received a gold watch and 100,000 pesetas (€221,172 historic standard of living value in 2021). Other high-ranking officials in his Ministry also accepted them.

Still, Salazar Alonso considered it too little, demanded more, and eventually arranged a police raid into the Grand Casino Kursaal of San Sebastián on the inauguration day. To get back at him, the inventors leaked documents on the matter to President Niceto Alcalá-Zamora. A complementary version notes that since they had invested a lot of money in the venture, they tried to recover it by blackmailing Prime Minister Alejandro Lerroux, whose nephew was involved in the scheme and influence peddling.

Lerroux refused to get involved, and Strauss denounced the affair to President Alcalá-Zamora, who made it public. The matter was debated at the Spanish Cortes in October 1935, which exonerated Salazar Alonso, with the help of CEDA. José Antonio Primo de Rivera, disgusted by the corruption on display, shouted an ironic "Long live the Straperlo!" from the gallery. Despite Alonso's official exoneration, the affair permanently ruined his reputation and doomed the Radical Party, although he hung onto his position as mayor of Madrid.

== Consequences ==
The reaction of the parties in the opposition, along with the reaction to the Nombela affair, caused the fall of Lerroux and his Radical Republican Party government. The new elections were won by the Popular Front and supported by the Communist Party of Spain, amid great instability, while the Radical Republicans collapsed. The election ultimately resulted in the coup d'état promulgated by General Francisco Franco's Nationalists in July 1936.

== Usage ==
After the scandal, especially after the Spanish Civil War, the word was incorporated as "estraperlo" into the Spanish language, and into the Catalan language, with the meaning of any scheme which is illegal or corrupt, particularly the black market.

== See also ==
- History of Spain
- Stavisky Affair, a 1934 scandal centered in Bayonne that shook the French republic.

== Sources ==
- José Carlos García Rodríguez El Caso Strauss. El escándalo que precipitó el final de la II República Editorial Akrón, Astorga (León), 2008 ISBN 978-84-936725-0-8.
- Marc Fontbona, El estraperlo, una ruleta política, "La Aventura de la historia" (Madrid), núm. 120 (Octubre 2008), 36–40.
- Preston, Paul (2013). The Spanish Holocaust: Inquisition and Extermination in Twentieth-Century Spain. W. W. Norton & Company. ISBN 978-0393345919.
