= Leonard Schapiro =

British historian

Leonard Schapiro CBE
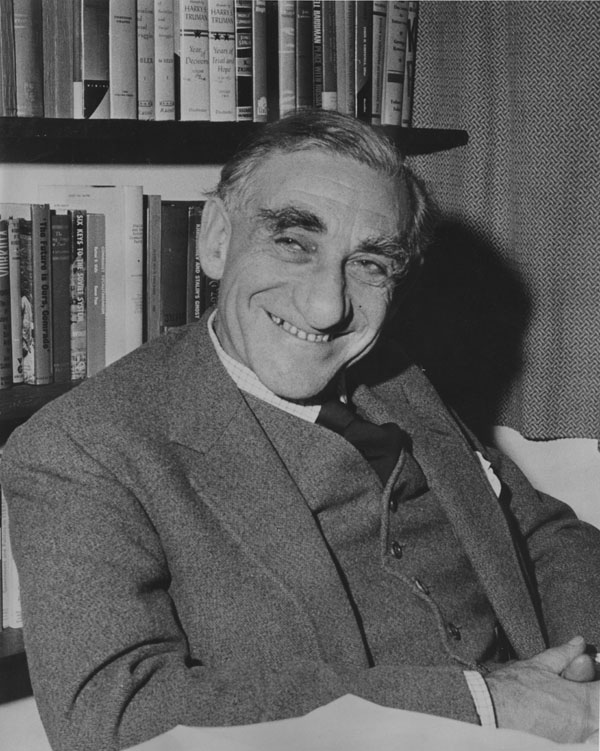
- Schapiro in the 1970s at the LSE
- Born: Leonard Bertram Naman Schapiro; 22 April 1908; Glasgow, United Kingdom
- Died: 2 November 1983 (aged 75); London, United Kingdom
- Education: University College London
- Occupation: Academic
- Organization: Institute for the Study of Conflict
- Known for: Historian
- Board member of: Information Research Department; Institute for European Defence and Strategic Studies; Institute for the Study of Conflict
- Parent(s): Max Schapiro, Leah Levine

Leonard Bertram Naman Schapiro CBE (22 April 1908 – 2 November 1983) was a British scholar of the origins and development of the Soviet political system. He taught for many years at the London School of Economics, where he was Professor of Political Science with Special Reference to Russian Studies. Schapiro was best known for his study, The Communist Party of the Soviet Union, though his early work on the rise to power of the Bolshevik Party, The Origins of the Communist Autocracy, was his most intellectually ambitious contribution to the field of Soviet studies. Because of his prominence in the field and his insistence on viewing the USSR through a normative lens, Schapiro accumulated his share of detractors, including those who were uncomfortable with his embrace of totalitarianism as a descriptor of Soviet rule and those who alleged that his reputed ties to British intelligence services made him little more than a political propagandist.

Schapiro was of Russian-Jewish background; his father, Max, was the University of Glasgow-educated son of a wealthy businessman who owned a timber mill and forests outside Riga, Latvia; his mother, Leah, was a Polish rabbi's daughter. Born in Glasgow, he was taken to Russia and spent some of his childhood in Riga (his father having taken over the family timber business) and St. Petersburg, when his father took a position in railway administration. He returned to Britain with his parents in 1920 and completed his education in London, at St Paul's School, then at University College, London. He was called to the Bar from Gray's Inn in 1932, returning to the law after the Second World War until 1955. His fluency in Russian, German, French and Italian led him to work for the B.B.C.'s Monitoring Service in 1940; in 1942 he joined the General Staff at the War Office, and from 1945 to 1946 served in the Intelligence Division of the German Control Command, reaching the rank of lieutenant-colonel. Schapiro's traditional liberalism alienated him from those scholars more sympathetic to the goals, if not the means, of Soviet socialism, such as E. H. Carr.

A scholar with interests that ranged well beyond political history, Schapiro was the author of an authoritative biography of Ivan Turgenev, as well as the translator into English of Turgenev's novel Spring Torrents. After his death, some of his articles on liberalism, Marxism, and literature appeared in the volume Russian Studies. He had married firstly, in 1943, Isabel de Madariaga, an historian of eighteenth century Russia; following their 1976 divorce, he married editor Roma Thewes.

Schapiro was appointed a Commander of the Order of the British Empire (CBE) in the 1980 Birthday Honours.

== Books ==
- The Origins of the Communist Autocracy, G. Bell and Sons, 1955.
- The Government and Politics of the Soviet Union, Random House Publishers, 1965, six editions total up to 1977. ISBN 9780091055905
- The Communist Party of the Soviet Union, Random House Publishers, 1970. ISBN 9780394470146
- Totalitarianism: Key Concepts in Political Science, The University of Michigan, 1972.
- The Russian Revolutions of 1917: The Origins of Modern Communism, Basic Books, Inc., Publishers, 1984.
- Russian Studies, Viking Penguin, Inc., Publishers, 1987. ISBN 978-0670812813
