= The Heart of Jade =

1942 historical novel by Salvador de Madariaga

- First English-language edition
- Author: Salvador de Madariaga
- Original title: El corazón de piedra verde
- Language: Spanish
- Genre: Historical novel
- Publication date: 1942
- Publication place: Spain
- English publication date: 1944 (Collins)
- Media type: Print (Hardback)
- LC Class: PQ6623.A4

The Heart of Jade (Spanish: El corazón de piedra verde) is a novel by Spanish author Salvador de Madariaga, first published in 1942. It is a Historical novel set in Spain and Mexico during the sixteenth century, and features both fictional and historical characters.

The novel was intended as the first of five that would track the creation of modern Mexico through the descendants of its characters Alonso and Xuchitl, with each novel covering a century from the sixteenth to the twentieth. Only four novels were finished before Salvador de Madariaga died.

The novel contains a great deal of geographical, political and religious references and historical data, drawing on de Madariaga's own scholarship, and also that of other authors, including Bernal Díaz del Castillo and his book Verdadera Historia de la Conquista de la Nueva España (in English, "True History of the Conquest of New Spain").

== Plot summary ==
The novel begins in the late pre-Columbian age. The Mexican strand depicts the daily life of the ancient Aztec people, both commoners (servants, traders and warriors) and the upper classes (priests, nobles, and government officials).

The novel also recounts the history and development of the Manriques, a family of Spanish nobles, and details aspects of life in 15th-century Spain. The Manrique family lives through major historical events, such as the reconquest of Spain by Ferdinand II of Aragon and Isabella I of Castile, the expulsion of the Jews from Spain in 1492, the reception of Christopher Columbus twice at Torremala (the Family Settlement), news of the discovery of the Americas and the relationship between the family of Hernán Cortés and the Manriques.

The two stories eventually merge with the meeting of the two main characters, Alonso Manrique and Xuchitl (the daughter of King Nezahualpilli of Texcoco, one of the three allied kingdoms that Cortés found at the time of his arrival). As Cortés approaches the great city of Tenochtitlan, the Mexican natives line the city's main causeway. Xuchitl is among the gathered crowds, and sees Alonso Manrique there for the first time. The Mexican characters struggle with love, pain, pride, and hate with the Spanish group of characters as the conquest proceeds.

The novel deals with the "conflict between two worlds": Christian Europe and Aztec America. Both civilizations are represented by equally-committed proponents: Alonso Manrique (Europe) and Itzcauatzin (America). Both characters are soldiers and priests (symbolizing nationalism and faith). Alonso started as a priest and later became a warrior; Itzcauatzin entered an academy (Calmecac) that prepared him for both. Caught in between is Xuchitl, the Aztec princess. Whoever wins her wins the future of the Aztec civilization. Xuchitl identifies the winner by giving him the Aztec talisman known as "el corazon de piedra verde" ("the green stone heart"). This talisman was worn by her father and represents the mystic powers of the Aztec religion. Alonso wins, signifying the beginning of the Christianization of Mexico. Itzcauatzin gives his life as a human sacrifice vainly trying to add enough power to the traditional religion to overcome the Europeans. In the end, Alonso and Xuchitl have a son and return to Mexico from Spain. They bring the jade heart with them, but with the Virgin Mary etched on it to counteract the stone's original powers.

== Reception ==
Kirkus Reviews judged it an example of a "completely escapist type of picaresque novel", noting that it "is overlong, the names are difficult, the subplots and counterplots at times take precedence over the parallel streams of the story of Alonzo in Spain and Xuchitl in Yucatan". However, it conceded that it would "have a fascination for those who can lose themselves in its rich tapestry of the 16th century Aztec civilization, and a story full of adventure and exotic glamour."

New Mexico Quarterly Review also found it long, noting that "Alonzo and Xuchitl do not meet until page 427, by which time the reader's appetite for romance has been slightly tempered". However, it also noted the novel's erudition, with "a wealth of lore concerning the Aztecs, their religion, superstitions, social and political organization, daily life and customs", and the "vividness of many fine descriptive passages and the fully drawn portraits of a great number of characters both historical and imaginary". It concluded that the novel provided "a most pleasurable and solid reading experience".
