= Pierre Defraigne =

Pierre Defraigne was executive director for the Brussels-based think tank the Madariaga - College of Europe Foundation.

From 1970 to 2005 he served as a European civil servant: he was head of cabinet for Étienne Davignon (EU Commission vice-president 1977–1983); director for North–South relations; head of cabinet for Pascal Lamy (EU Commissioner for Trade 1999–2002); and deputy director-general at DG Trade, European Commission. From 2005 to 2008 Defraigne also established and managed the Brussels branch of the Institut français des relations internationales (IFRI).

Pierre Defraigne was also professor of economics at the Institutes for European Studies (Facultés universitaires Saint-Louis and Université Catholique de Louvain) and at the College of Europe, Bruges, and was a visiting professor at Zhejiang University, China.

Pierre Defraigne died on August 2, 2022.

== Last publications ==
Only Europe, (Brussels: La Libre Belgique, 2009)

‘Bretton-Woods III needs a G3-Plus’, Madariaga Paper, Vol. 2, No. 7, (Dec., 2009)

‘La Chine forcera-t-elle l'UE à l'unité politique?’, Madariaga Paper, Vol. 2, No. 5, (Jul., 2009)

‘Seulement 176 millions d'Européens’, Madariaga Paper, Vol. 2, No. 4, (Jun., 2009)

‘La fausse piste de la Stratégie de Lisbonne’, Madariaga Paper, Vol. 2, No. 2, (May, 2009)

‘Barroso intergouvernementalisé!’, Madariaga Paper, Vol. 2, No. 3, (Mar., 2009)

‘Les à-coups de l'intergouvernemental’, Madariaga Paper, Vol. 1, No. 8, (Nov., 2008)

‘Le Parlement Européen sous le vent vivifiant de la crise’, Madariaga Paper, Vol. 1, No. 7, (Nov., 2008)

‘La Crise défera ou refera l'Europe’, Madariaga Paper, Vol. 1, No. 6, (Oct., 2008)

‘Leaping Beyond the Lisbon Treaty’, Madariaga Paper, Vol. 1, No. 5, (Oct., 2008)

‘Taking No for a Question’, Madariaga Paper, Vol. 1, No. 1, (Jun., 2008)
