= Maradiaga =

Maradiaga is a surname. Notable people with the surname include:

- Jorge Maradiaga (born 1972), Honduran decathlete
- Ramón Maradiaga (born 1954), Honduran footballer and manager
- Félix Maradiaga (born 1976), Nicaraguan politician

== See also ==
- Javier Hernández Maradiaga (born 1988), Honduran swimmer
- Óscar Rodríguez Maradiaga (born 1942), Honduran Roman Catholic archbishop
- Madariaga
