= Nombela scandal =

The Nombela scandal or Nombela affair was a corruption scandal during the Second Spanish Republic. The scandal had a serious political impact on the coalition government of the Radical Republican Party and CEDA, due to many distinguished members of the Republican Party, including its leader Alejandro Lerroux, being associated with it. The scandal, was one of the factors that contributed to the fall of the government and the 1936 elections. It took its name by the person who brought it into light, Antonio Nombela.

== The scandal ==
The scandal broke out in November 1935, shortly after the Straperlo scandal, and it further discredited the Radical Republican Party. The colonial official Antonio Nombela accused several leaders of Lerroux's party, and especially the vice-secretary of the Presidency of the Government, Moreno Calvo, of signing a contract paying the West African Company, property of the Catalan businessman Antonio Tayá, to connect the route between Fernando Poo, Río Muni and Annobón by ship, which had been canceled in 1929. The government of Lerroux had approved a payment of 3 million pesetas to the West African Company on 12 July 1935, and when Nombela refused to pay it and brought the case to some CEDA ministers, José María Gil Robles and Luis Lucia, he was dismissed from his position on 26 July. Nombela then took the matter to the Cortes, where a commission of inquiry was formed. Unlike the Straperlo scandal, Alejandro Lerroux was directly involved because as president of the government he had signed the contract. When the parliamentary debate took place, Alejandro Lerroux was not able to give convincing explanations about the corruption accusations, although he was exonerated in the vote.

This second scandal affecting the Radical Republican Party condemned it politically and accelerated its disintegration. This was taken advantage of by the CEDA leader José María Gil Robles to end support for the coalition government and demand that the president of the Republic Niceto Alcalá Zamora propose him to the Cortes as the new head of the government. But Alcalá Zamora refused to allow a party that had not proclaimed its loyalty to the Republic to occupy power and entrusted the formation of the government to a politician he trusted, the liberal Portela Valladares. But the Portela government that was formed on 15 December 1935, formed by center-right Republicans and leaving out the CEDA, did not get a confidence vote by the Cortes, so Alcalá Zamora decided to dissolve the Cortes on 7 January 1936 and call new elections for February. These would be won by the left-wing coalition Popular Front.
