= Janet M. Hartley =

English professor of international history

Janet Margaret Hartley FRHS is an emeritus professor of international history at the London School of Economics.

== Early life ==
Janet Hartley was born in 1954. She studied history at University College London, before completing her doctorate at the School of Slavonic and East European Studies at the University of London.

== Career ==
Hartley is a specialist in Russian history, in particular the comparison of Russia and the West from the seventeenth century onwards and why Russia became one of the "Great Powers" in the nineteenth century. Much of her research has also focused on the history of Siberia and its people.

== Selected publications ==
- The Study of Russian History from British Archive Sources (editor) (1986)
- Guide to Documents and Manuscripts in the United Kingdom relating to Russia and the Soviet Union (1987)
- Russia in the Age of the Enlightenment (editor with R. Bartlett), (1990)
- Alexander I (1994)
- Finland and Poland in the Russian Empire: A Comparative Study (editor with M. Branch) (1995)
- Britain and Russia in the Age of Peter the Great (editor with M. Anderson et al.) (1998)
- A Social History of the Russian Empire 1650-1825 (1999)
- Charles Whitworth: Diplomat in the Age of Peter the Great (2002)
- Russia-1762-1815: Military Power, the State and the People (Greenwood Press, 2008)
- Russian History and Literature in the Eighteenth Century (editor), includes a piece by her on 'The Army and Prisoners' (2013)
- Siberia: a History of the People (2014)
- The Volga: A History (Yale University Press, 2020)
