= Ricardo Samper =

Spanish politician

The Most Excellent Ricardo Samper OIC
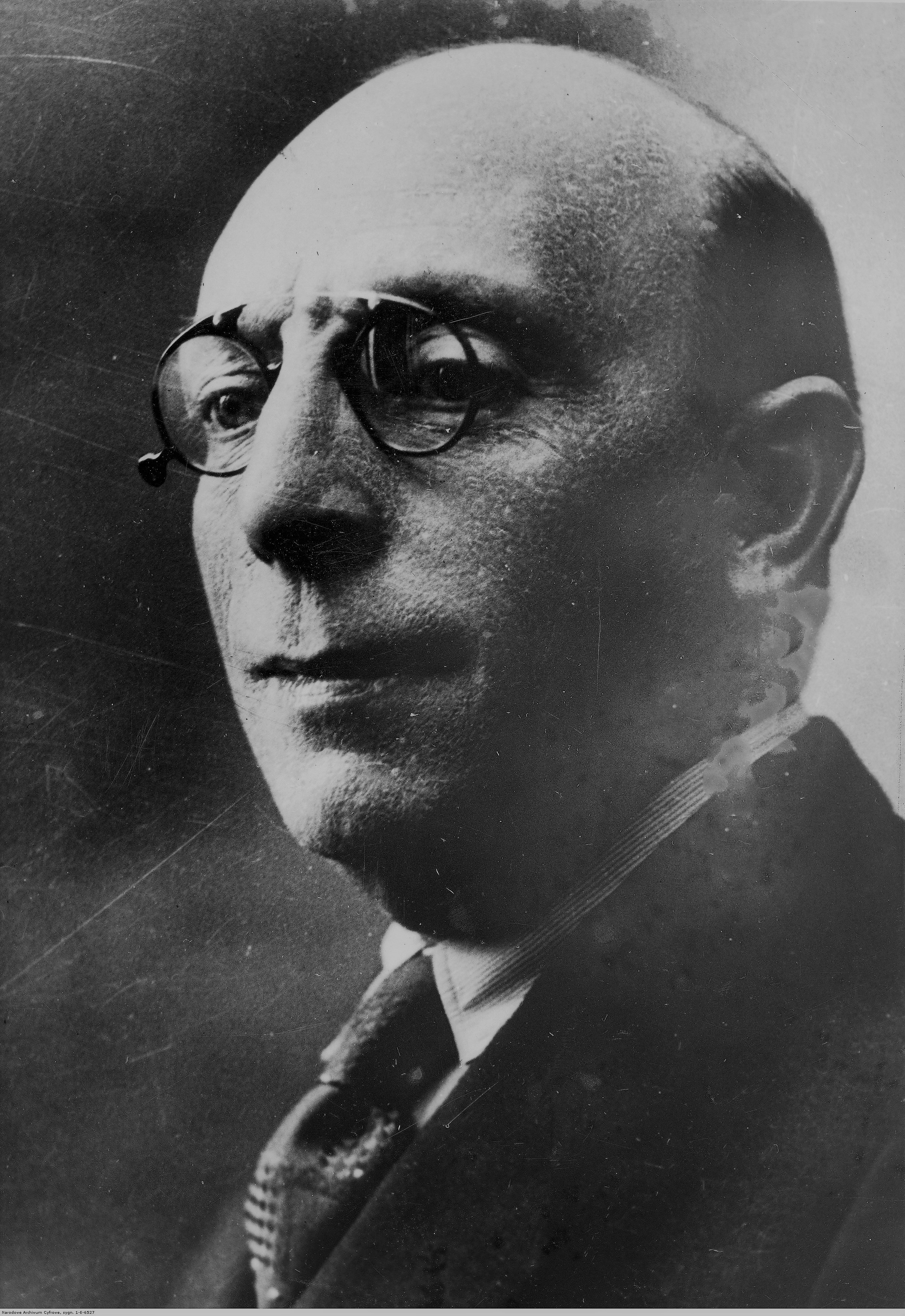

Prime Minister of Spain
- In office 28 April 1934 – 4 October 1934
- President: Niceto Alcala-Zamora
- Preceded by: Alejandro Lerroux
- Succeeded by: Alejandro Lerroux

Personal details
- Born: 25 August 1881 Valencia, Spain
- Died: 27 October 1938 (aged 57) Leysin, Switzerland
- Party: Radical Republican Party

Ricardo Samper Ibáñez (25 August 1881 – 27 October 1938) was a Spanish political figure during the Second Spanish Republic.

== Political career ==
Samper served as Valencia mayor between 1920 and 1923. In 1931 he was elected as Member of the Parliament with Alejandro Lerroux's Radical Republican Party. He served first as Minister of Labor and later as Minister of Industry.

On 28 April 1934, he was appointed the 127th President of the Government when Lerroux quit. As one of Lerroux's chief lieutenants, he was asked by Alcala Zamora to succeed Lerroux. He was also a follower of Vicente Blasco Ibáñez, the novelist from the more liberal side of the party. Samper resigned the post in October, after losing CEDA's support amid the "Revolutionary Insurrection of 1934".

On 4 October, a new coalition was announced, and the "Socialist revolutionary committee" was announced. He served in the following government for one month, after which he quit politics.

Samper left Spain at the outbreak of the Spanish Civil War and went into exile. He died of tuberculosis in Leysin, Switzerland. In 1951 his remains were transferred back to Spain.
