= Madariaga – College of Europe Foundation =

The Madariaga – College of Europe Foundation was a foundation affiliated with the College of Europe, dedicated to promoting original thinking on the role of the European Union in an era of global change, engaging citizens and international partners in a creative debate on the issues that shape Europe's future. Through research and action, the Foundation pursues a three-fold mission of "challenging the citizen," "empowering Europe," and "preventing conflict."

The Foundation's activities were supported by research and articles published in the form of a Madariaga Paper and regular events, seminars and lunch-time debates, the Citizen's Controversies.

The Foundation's name honoured one of the founders of the College of Europe: Spanish writer, minister in the Spanish Republican government, historian, diplomat and philosopher Salvador de Madariaga (1886-1978).

The Foundation was presided over by Javier Solana, who is a twice-removed first cousin of Foundation's co-founder Salvador de Madariaga. Jean-Luc Dehaene presided over the Foundation's Executive Committee and Pierre Defraigne held the position of Executive Director.
