= Nieves Mathews =

British translator and writer

Nieves Mathews (1917–2003) was a British translator and writer best known for her biography of Sir Francis Bacon.

== Family ==
Born Nieves Hayat de Madariaga Archibald in Glasgow, Scotland, on 3 December 1917, she was the elder daughter of the Spanish diplomat and writer Salvador de Madariaga and the Scottish economic historian Constance Helen Margaret (née Archibald). Her younger sister was the historian Isabel de Madariaga.

She studied French and Spanish at King's College London. On 23 April 1939, she married Paul William Mathews and had two children.

== Career and writings ==
Mathews began her career at the British Council in Mexico City and later worked as a translator and report writer for various international organisations in Angola, Uruguay and Europe, including over 20 years spent with the Food and Agriculture Organization (a United Nations agency headquartered in Rome).

In 1956, she published a crime novel, entitled She Died Without Light.

Her biography of Sir Francis Bacon, entitled Francis Bacon: The History of a Character Assassination, was published by Yale University in 1996. She claimed in the acknowledgements that the book was suggested and blessed by "my teacher, Osho" (Rajneesh), "who thought highly of Sir Francis Bacon and gave the book his blessing". She was also deeply influenced by the works of Immanuel Velikovsky.

Mathews also contributed poems, articles and stories to periodicals, including Encounter, Cambridge Literary Review, Botteghe Oscure, and Baconiana.
