= Alejandro Lerroux =

Spanish pro-Republican politician

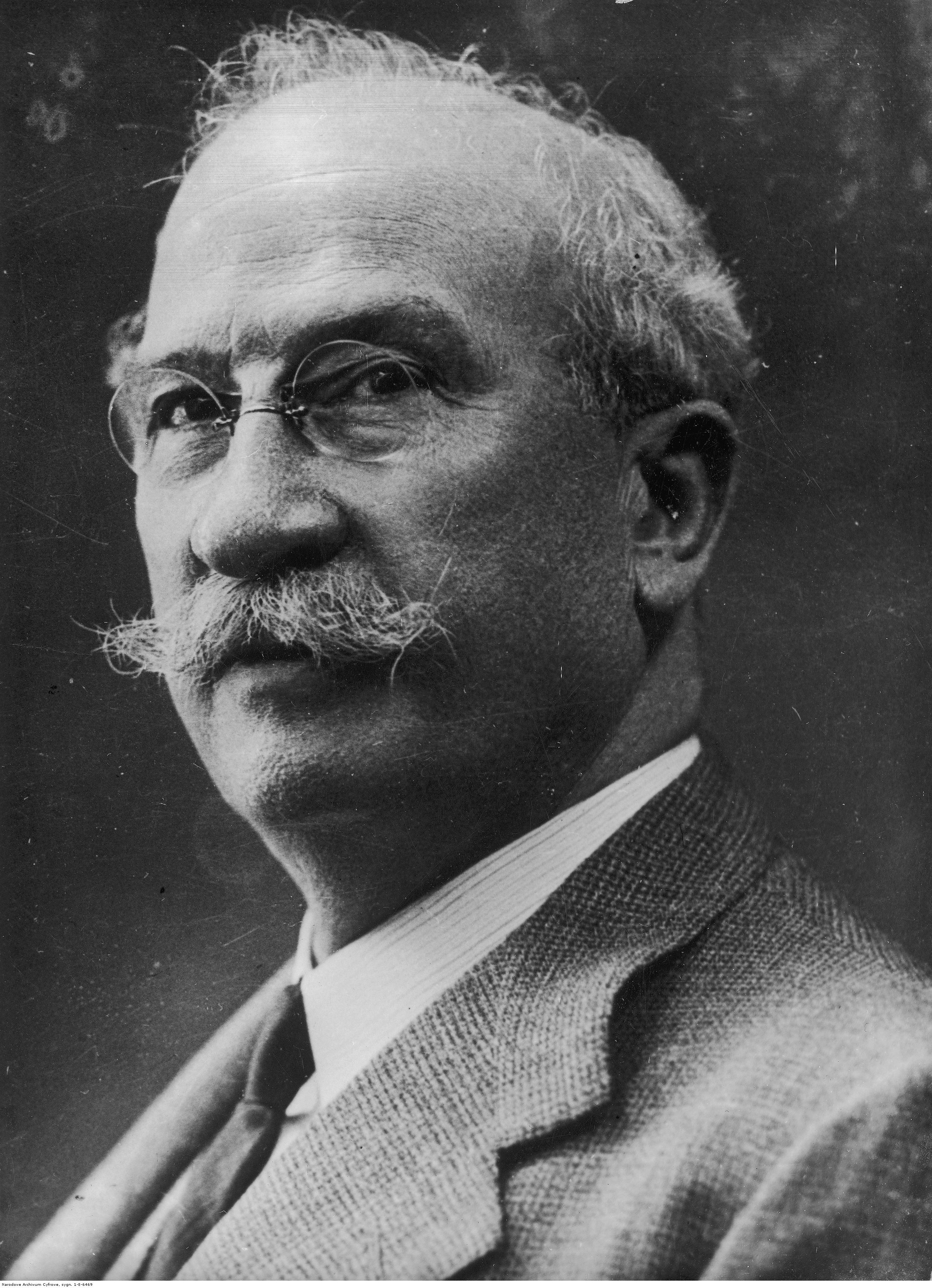

Prime Minister of Spain
- In office 12 September 1933 – 9 October 1933
- President: Niceto Alcalá Zamora
- Preceded by: Manuel Azaña
- Succeeded by: Diego Martínez Barrio
- In office 16 December 1933 – 28 April 1934
- President: Niceto Alcalá Zamora
- Preceded by: Diego Martínez Barrio
- Succeeded by: Ricardo Samper
- In office 4 October 1934 – 25 September 1935
- President: Niceto Alcalá-Zamora
- Preceded by: Ricardo Samper
- Succeeded by: Joaquín Chapaprieta

Minister of State of Spain
- In office 14 April – 16 December 1931
- President: Niceto Alcalá-Zamora
- Prime Minister: Manuel Azaña
- President of the Provisional Government: Niceto Alcalá-Zamora; Manuel Azaña
- Preceded by: Count of Romanones
- Succeeded by: Luis de Zulueta
- In office 25 September – 29 October 1935
- President: Niceto Alcalá-Zamora
- Prime Minister: Joaquín Chapaprieta
- Preceded by: Juan José Racha García
- Succeeded by: José Martínez de Velasco

Minister of War of Spain
- In office 16 November 1934 – 3 April 1936
- President: Niceto Alcalá-Zamora
- Prime Minister: Himself
- Preceded by: Diego Hidalgo y Durán
- Succeeded by: Carlos Masquelet

Member of the Congress of Deputies
- In office 8 December 1933 – 7 January 1936
- Constituency: Valencia
- In office 14 July 1931 – 9 October 1933
- Constituency: Madrid

Personal details
- Born: Alejandro Lerroux García; 4 March 1864 La Rambla, Córdoba, Spain
- Died: 25 June 1949 (aged 85) Madrid, Spain
- Party: Radical Republican Party
- Spouse: Teresa López
- Children: Aurelio Lerroux (adoptive)
- Parent: Alejandro Lerroux Rodríguez (father)
- Occupation: Lawyer

Alejandro Lerroux García (4 March 1864 – 25 June 1949) was a Spanish politician who was the leader of the Radical Republican Party. He served as Prime Minister three times from 1933 to 1935 and held several cabinet posts as well. A highly charismatic politician, he was distinguished by his demagogical and populist political style.

Founder and leader of the Radical Republican Party (PRR), he was a controversial politician from the beginning, being especially known for his demagogic rhetoric. With a workerist, anticlerical discourse and diametrically opposed to the incipient Catalan nationalism, during his first political stage he became a prominent political leader in Barcelona. Later he would adopt more moderate positions, having a prominent role in the proclamation of the Second Spanish Republic. Faced with the Manuel Azaña governments during the so-called "reformist" biennium, from September 1933 he would assume the presidency of the Council of Ministers and became one of the main arbiters of the political situation during the conservative biennium of 1934–1935.

His turn to the right, however, led his party to suffer several splits; His image was also badly damaged among the public by a succession of corruption scandals that became public at the end of 1935. After the collapse of the Radical Party in the 1936 elections, Lerroux disappeared from the political scene. With the outbreak of the Spanish Civil War, he went into exile in Portugal.

== Biography ==
He was initiated as Freemason around 1886 in Madrid's Vetonica lodge of the Grand Orient of Spain, but his activity was limited, among other reasons due to his disillusion with the prospects this membership offered to his immediate purposes.

Lerroux agitated as a young man in the ranks of the radical republicans, as a follower of Manuel Ruiz Zorrilla. He practised a demagogic and aggressive journalistic style in the diverse publications that he directed (El País, El Progreso, El Intransigente and El Radical).

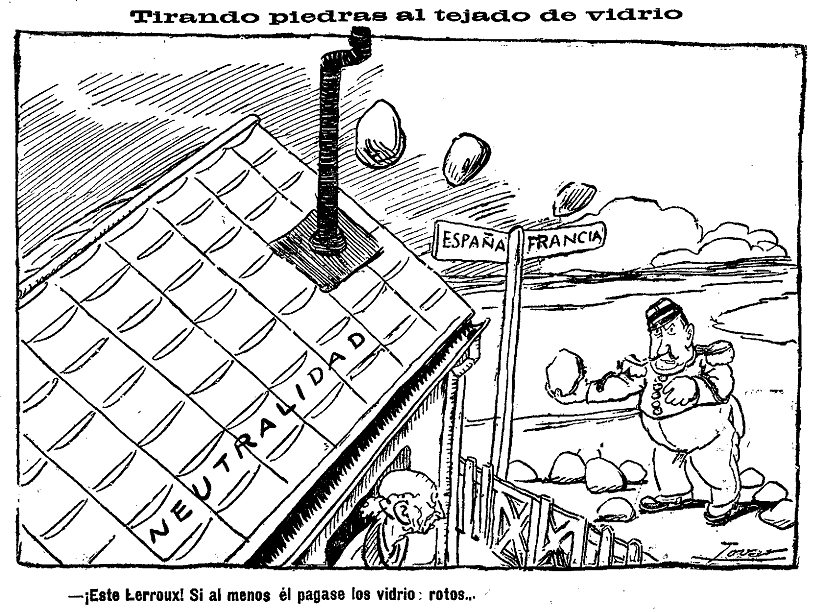
Lerroux, by Tovar, in El Imparcial.

From the 1890s onwards Lerroux radicalized his discourse. His populist and anticlerical speeches, as well as his intervention in diverse campaigns against the governments of the Restoration, made him very popular among workers in Barcelona, who later constituted the base of a loyal electorate. A prominent anti-catalanist, he became known as the "Emperor of the Paralelo". In 1898 and 1899, he organized through his newspapers a campaign for the judicial review of the Montjuic trial in which forced confessions through torture had led to the execution of some of the suspects for the 1896 Barcelona Corpus Christi procession bombing. This contributed to his rise as a left-wing political force in Barcelona.

In 1906, Lerroux rallied his followers with the following exhortation: "Young barbarians of today: enter and sack the decadent civilization of this unhappy country, destroy its temples, finish off its gods, tear the veil from its novices and raise them up to be mothers to virilize the species, break into the records of property and make bonfires of its papers that fire may purify the infamous social organization. Enter its humble hearths and raise the legions of proletarians that the world may tremble before their awakened judges. Do not be stopped by altars nor by tombs. Fight, kill, die."

He was elected as a member of the Congress of Deputies for the first time in 1901 and again in 1903 and 1905, as a member of the Republican Union that he had helped to form with Nicolás Salmerón. The defection of Salmerón to the Catalan Solidarity coalition in 1906 led Lerroux to form the Radical Republican Party (1908) and headed the struggle against increasing Catalan nationalism. There is some evidence that both Francisco Ferrer and Lerroux may have participated in the hatching of two different plots to assassinate king Alfonso XIII in 1905 and 1906. He had to go into exile on several occasions, first to escape condemnation dictated by one of his articles (1907) and later fleeing from governmental repression in response to the Tragic Week in Barcelona (1909).

After returning to Spain, Lerroux agreed to join the Republican–Socialist Conjunction, and he was elected as a deputy again in 1910. Afterwards, he was involved in a series of scandals that moved him away from his Barcelona electorate, with corruption accusations forcing him into a change of district, appearing for Córdoba in 1914). From 1919 he was on the payroll of Barcelona Traction, part of the Anglo-Canadian Traction, Light, and Power Company.

Under the dictatorship of Miguel Primo de Rivera (1923–30), his party was debilitated when its left-wing, led by Marcelino Domingo, left to form the Radical Socialist Republican Party in 1929. However, he continued to be active in politics, attending the revolutionary committee that produced the Pact of San Sebastián with the intention of overthrowing King Alfonso XIII and proclaiming a republic.

=== Second Republic ===
Under the republican government, Lerroux regained a leading political role, being appointed prime minister three times between 1933 and 1935 and occupying the distinguished ministerial portfolios of War (1934) and State (1935).

He was part of the coalition of leftists that supported the reforms of Manuel Azaña's government during the first biennium (1931–1933), during which time he served as Minister of State between 14 April 1931 and 16 December 1931. From 12 September to 9 October 1933, he was Prime Minister.

After the victory of the Spanish Confederation of the Autonomous Right (CEDA) in the elections of autumn 1933, Lerroux again became prime minister, mainly because the President, Niceto Alcalá-Zamora, did not wish to appoint CEDA leader José María Gil-Robles y Quiñones. As such, he served from 16 December 1933 to 28 April 1934 and again from 4 October 1934 to 25 September 1935. He also served as minister of war (1934), state (1935) and foreign affairs (1935).

After the attempted revolution of October 1934, he fell out of favor due to the Straperlo affair (a case of corruption bound to gambling legalization), which completely broke his alliance with the right and even weakened his position within the party. This was followed by the Nombela scandal, where he participated actively by signing a contract paying a private company 3 million pesetas to perform a cancelled route, leading to his further discreditment.

In the elections of 1936, Lerroux was not elected as a deputy. The same year, the Spanish Civil War broke out and he fled to Portugal. He returned to Spain in 1947.

== See also ==
- Catalan nationalism
- ¡Cu-Cut! and El Be Negre
- Second biennium of the Second Spanish Republic

Political offices
Preceded by Álvaro Figueroa y Torres	Minister of State; 1931	Succeeded by Luis de Zulueta
Preceded by Manuel Azaña	Prime Minister of Spain; 1933	Succeeded by Diego Martínez Barrio
Preceded by Diego Martínez Barrio	Prime Minister of Spain; 1933-1934	Succeeded by Ricardo Samper
Preceded by Ricardo Samper	Prime Minister of Spain; 1934-1935	Succeeded by Joaquín Chapaprieta Torregrosa
Preceded by Juan José Rocha García	Minister of State; 1935	Succeeded by José Martínez de Velasco
Party political offices
Preceded by Party created	Leader of the Radical Republican Party; 1908–1936	Succeeded by Party dissolved
