= Government and Opposition =

Academic journal

- Discipline: Politics
- Language: English
- Edited by: Isabelle Hertner, Erik Jones

Publication details
- History: 1965-present
- Publisher: Cambridge University Press for Government and Opposition Ltd. (United Kingdom)
- Frequency: Quarterly
- Impact factor: 2.582 (2018)

Standard abbreviations
- ISO 4: Gov. Oppos.

Indexing
- ISSN: 0017-257X (print); 1477-7053 (web)
- LCCN: 65009983
- OCLC no.: 904489489

Links
- Journal homepage; Online access; Online archive; Journal page at Wiley-Blackwell

Government and Opposition is a quarterly peer-reviewed academic journal on politics. It was published by Wiley-Blackwell until 2013, when it switched to Cambridge University Press. The journal was established in 1965 and the editors-in-chief are Isabelle Hertner (King's College London) and Erik Jones (Johns Hopkins University). According to the Journal Citation Reports, the journal has a 2018 impact factor of 2.582, ranking it 32nd out of 176 journals in the category "Political Science".
