= Salvador de Madariaga =

Spanish diplomat, writer and historian (1886–1978)

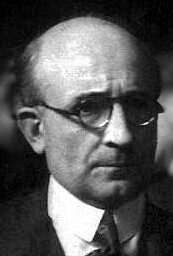
- Madariaga in 1936

1st President of the Liberal International
- In office 20 April 1948 – 18 April 1952
- Preceded by: Position established
- Succeeded by: Roger Motz

Seat M of the Real Academia Española
- In office 2 May 1976 (Note: Elected on 20 May 1936) – 14 December 1978
- Preceded by: Emilio Gutiérrez Gamero
- Succeeded by: Carlos Bousoño

Personal details
- Born: Salvador de Madariaga y Rojo; 23 July 1886 A Coruña, Spain
- Died: 14 December 1978 (aged 92) Locarno, Ticino, Switzerland
- Other political affiliations: Mont Pelerin Society
- Spouses: Constance Helen Margaret (m. 1912; died 1970) Emilia Rauman (m. 1970)
- Children: 2, Isabel and Nieves
- Occupation: Writer; Diplomat; Scholar
- Awards: Charlemagne Prize (1973)

Salvador de Madariaga y Rojo (23 July 1886 – 14 December 1978) was a Spanish "eminent liberal", diplomat, writer, historian and pacifist who was nominated for the Nobel Prize in Literature and the Nobel Peace Prize and awarded the Charlemagne Prize in 1973.

== Early life ==
Salvador de Madariaga y Rojo was born on 23 July 1886 in A Coruña, Galicia, Kingdom of Spain. He graduated with a degree in engineering in Paris, France.

== Career ==
Madariaga returned to Spain and became an engineer for the Northern Spanish Railway Company. He then came into contact with Generación del 14 intellectuals.

In 1916, he abandoned that for work in London as a journalist for The Times newspaper. Meanwhile, he began publishing his first essays. In 1921, he became a press member of the Secretariat of the League of Nations and chief of the Disarmament Section in 1922. In 1928, he was appointed Professor of Spanish at Oxford University for three years during which he wrote a book on nation psychology, Englishmen, Frenchmen, Spaniards.

In 1931, the Second Spanish Republic appointed Madariaga as Spanish ambassador to the United States and a permanent delegate to the League of Nations; he kept the latter post for five years. Chairing the Council of the League of Nations in January 1932, he condemned Japan's aggression in Manchuria in such vehement terms that he was nicknamed "Don Quijote de la Manchuria". From 1932 to 1934, he served as ambassador to France. In 1933, he was elected to the National Congress and served as both Minister for Education and Minister for Justice.

In July 1936, as a classical liberal, he went into exile in England to escape the Spanish Civil War. There, he became a vocal opponent of and organised resistance to the Nationalists and to Francisco Franco's Spanish State.

In 1947, he was one of the principal authors of the Oxford Manifesto on liberalism. He participated in the Hague Congress in 1948 as president of the Cultural Commission and he was one of the co-founders in 1949 of the College of Europe.

In his writing career, he wrote books and essays about Don Quixote, Christopher Columbus, William Shakespeare's Hamlet, and the history of Latin America. He strongly supported a united and integrated Europe. He wrote in French, German, Spanish, Galician (his mother tongue) and English.

In 1973, he won the Charlemagne Prize for his contributions to the European idea and to European peace. In 1976, after Franco's death, Madariaga returned to Spain and became a member of the Spanish Royal Academy.

== Personal life and death ==
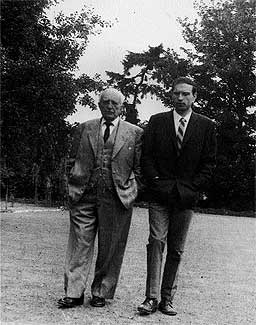
Madariaga with Antonio Jauregui in Oxford, 1972.

In 1912, Madariaga married Constance Archibald, a Scottish economic historian. The couple had two daughters: Nieves Mathews (1917–2003) and the professor and historian Isabel de Madariaga (1919–2014). Constance died in May 1970. In November 1970, he married Emilia Székely de Rauman, who had been his secretary since 1938 and would die in 1991 at 83.

Madariaga died at 92 on 16 December 1978, in Locarno, Switzerland.

== Awards and recognition ==
Madariaga received numerous prizes in his lifetime: including:

- Honorary Member of the Royal Academy of Spain (1936)
- Hansischer Goethe-Preis, University of Hamburg (1972)
- Charlemagne Prize (1973)

== Legacy ==
The Madariaga European Foundation has been named after him and promotes his vision of a united Europe and a more peaceful world. The 1979–1980 academic year at the College of Europe was named in his honour.

An Oxfordshire blue plaque in honour of him was unveiled at 3 St Andrew's Road, Headington, Oxford, by his daughter Isabel on 15 October 2011.

== Works ==
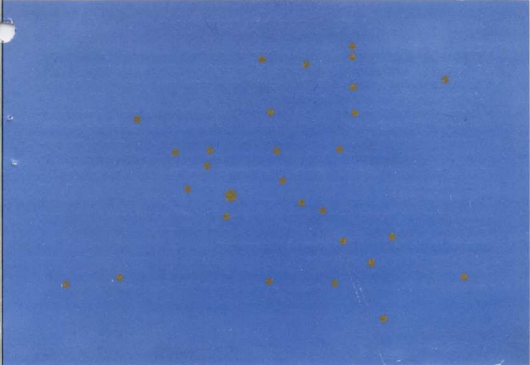
Old European flag design by Salvador de Madariaga

Madariaga wrote books in Spanish, English, French and German. He is best known for the novel El Corazón de Piedra Verde (Heart of Jade).

=== Selected books ===
- The Sacred Giraffe: Being the Second Volume of the Posthumous Works of Julio Arceval (1925) (science fiction novel)
- Englishmen, Frenchmen, Spaniards: An Essay in Comparative Psychology, Oxford University Press, 1929
- Disarmament, Coward-McCann, 1929
- Anarchy or Hierarchy, Macmillan, 1937
- Christopher Columbus, Macmillan, 1940
- The Rise of the Spanish-American Empire, Hollis & Carter; Macmillan, 1947
- The Fall of the Spanish-American Empire, Hollis & Carter, 1947; Macmillan, 1948
- Bolivar, Hollis & Carter, 1952
- Morning without Noon, 1973
- El Corazón de Piedra Verde, 1942 (Heart of Jade)
- War in the Blood (sequel to Heart of Jade)
- Spain: a Modern History
- Hernán Cortés – Conqueror of Mexico, Macmillan, 1941
- The Blowing up of the Parthenon, 1960
- On Hamlet, Hollis & Carter, 1948
- Latin America, Between the Eagle and the Bear, Praeger, 1962

=== Poetry ===
- The Serene Fountain (1927)
- Elegy on the Death of Unamuno (1937)
- Elegy at the Death of Federico García Lorca (1938)
- Rose of Silt and Ashes (1942)
- Romances for Beatriz (1955)
- She who Smells of Thyme and Rosemary (1959)
- Poppy (1965)

=== Articles ===
- "Englishman, Frenchman, Spaniard," The Atlantic (April 1928)
- "An Admirable Variety: Further Diversities of National Character," The Atlantic (September 1928)
- "Disarmament--American Plan," The Atlantic (April 1929)
- "Spain: The Politics," The Atlantic (March 1937)

== See also ==
- Contributions to liberal theory
- List of peace activists

== Notes ==
Political offices
Preceded by New position	President of the Liberal International; 1948–1952	Succeeded by Roger Motz
