= Niceto Alcalá-Zamora =

Spanish lawyer and politician (1877–1949)

The Most Excellent Niceto Alcalá-Zamora OIC, OSR
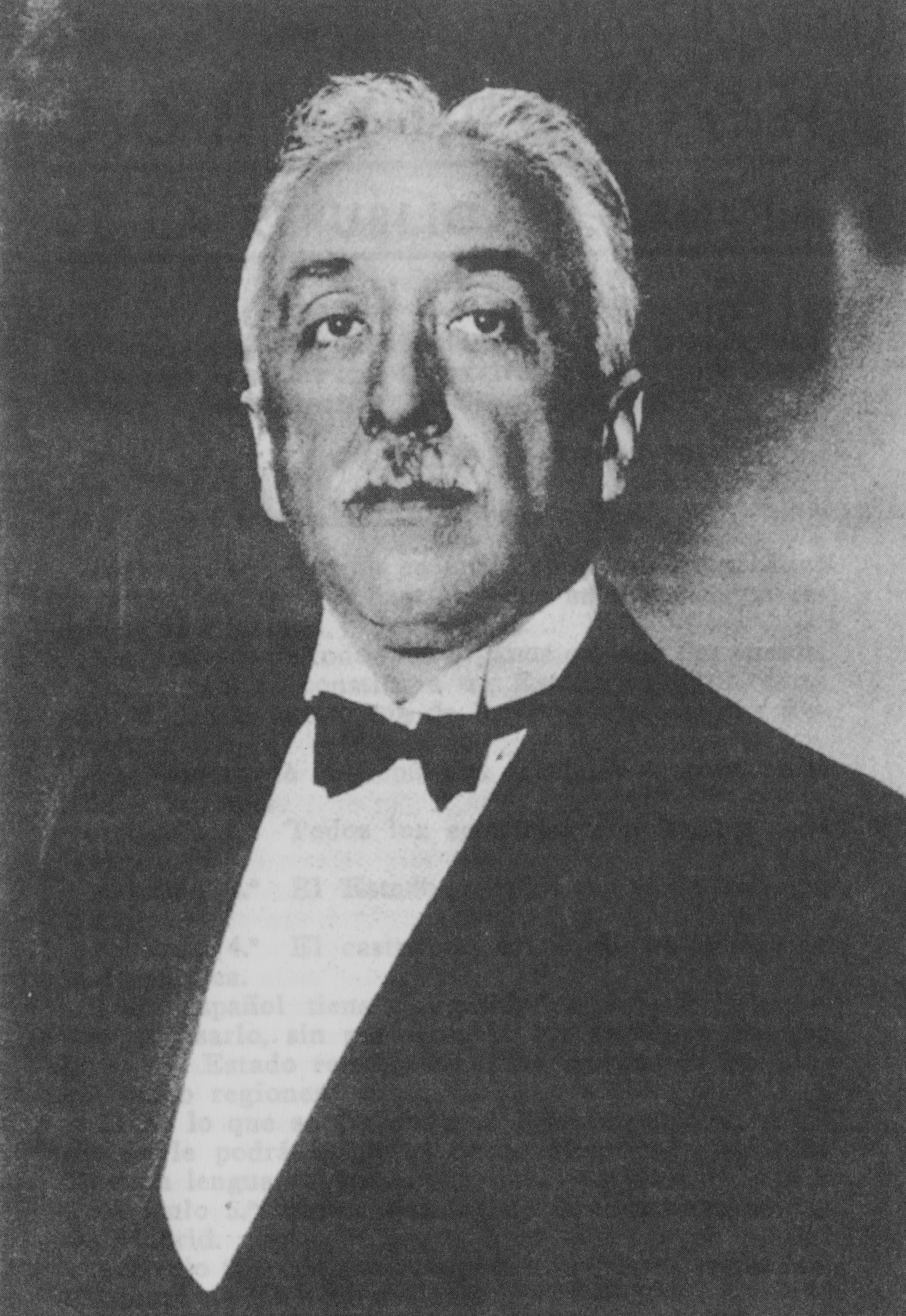
- Alcalá-Zamora in 1931

President of the Spanish Republic
- In office 10 December 1931 – 7 April 1936
- Prime Minister: Manuel Azaña; Alejandro Lerroux; Diego Martínez Barrio; Ricardo Samper; Joaquín Chapaprieta; Manuel Portela
- Preceded by: Francisco Serrano (President of the Executive Power of the Republic, 1874); Alfonso XIII (King of Spain, 1931)
- Succeeded by: Manuel Azaña

Prime Minister of Spain
- In office 14 April 1931 – 14 October 1931
- President: Himself
- Preceded by: Juan Bautista Aznar-Cabañas
- Succeeded by: Manuel Azaña

Minister of War
- In office 7 December 1922 – 28 May 1923
- Monarch: Alfonso XIII
- Prime Minister: Manuel García Prieto
- Preceded by: José Sánchez Guerra
- Succeeded by: Antonio López Muñoz

Minister of Public Works
- In office 1 November 1917 – 21 March 1918
- Monarch: Alfonso XIII
- Prime Minister: Manuel García Prieto
- Preceded by: Luis de Marichalar y Monreal
- Succeeded by: Francesc Cambó

Seat D of the Real Academia Española
- In office 8 May 1932 – 18 February 1949
- Preceded by: José Francos Rodríguez
- Succeeded by: Melchor Fernández Almagro

Personal details
- Born: 6 July 1877 Priego de Córdoba, Spain
- Died: 18 February 1949 (aged 71) Buenos Aires, Argentina
- Party: Liberal Party (1899–1923); Independent (1923–1931); Liberal Republican Right (1931–1936)
- Spouse: Purificación Castillo Bidaburu
- Children: 3 sons 3 daughters
- Education: University of Granada
- Profession: Lawyer, teacher
- Awards: Order of Isabella the Catholic

Niceto Alcalá-Zamora y Torres (6 July 1877 – 18 February 1949) was a Spanish lawyer and politician who served, briefly, as the first prime minister of the Second Spanish Republic, and then—from 1931 to 1936—as its president.

== Early life ==
Alcalá-Zamora was born on 6 July 1877 in Priego de Cordoba, son of Manuel Alcalá-Zamora y Caracuel and Francisca Torres y del Castillo. His mother died when Niceto was three years old.

A lawyer by profession, from a very young age, he was active in the Liberal Party. He was elected to the Congress of Deputies, and quickly gained fame for his eloquent speeches. He was Minister of Public Works in 1917-1918, and Minister of War in 1922-1923, in coalition governments headed by liberal leader Manuel García Prieto. He was also Spain's representative in the League of Nations.

His political career ended in 1923 when General Miguel Primo de Rivera seized power and established a military dictatorship. Disappointed by King Alfonso XIII's acceptance of the coup d'état, Alcalá-Zamora did not collaborate with the new regime.

== Second Republic ==
By 1930, Primo de Rivera had become discredited, due to bad economic conditions, and resigned in January. Alfonso XIII was also discredited, but tried to retain control by appointing interim prime ministers.

As popular discontent mounted, Alcala-Zamora declared himself a republican on 13 April in a meeting in the Apolo Theatre in Valencia.

In August, Alcala-Zamora and Miguel Maura brought many republican leaders together in San Sebastián. The meeting issued the Pact of San Sebastián, which named Alcala-Zamora as head of the "revolutionary committee", and planned a military coup against Alfonso.

The coup was attempted in December, but failed; Alcala-Zamora was imprisoned. Anti-monarchical agitation continued, though. In the municipal elections of 12 April 1931, monarchist candidates won more overall votes, but republicans did so well in the provincial cities that Alfonso gave up. Alcala-Zamora was released, and Alfonse handed over power to the "revolutionary committee" and fled the country.

The committee proclaimed the Second Spanish Republic on 14 April. and formed a provisional government with Alcalá-Zamora as Prime Minister.

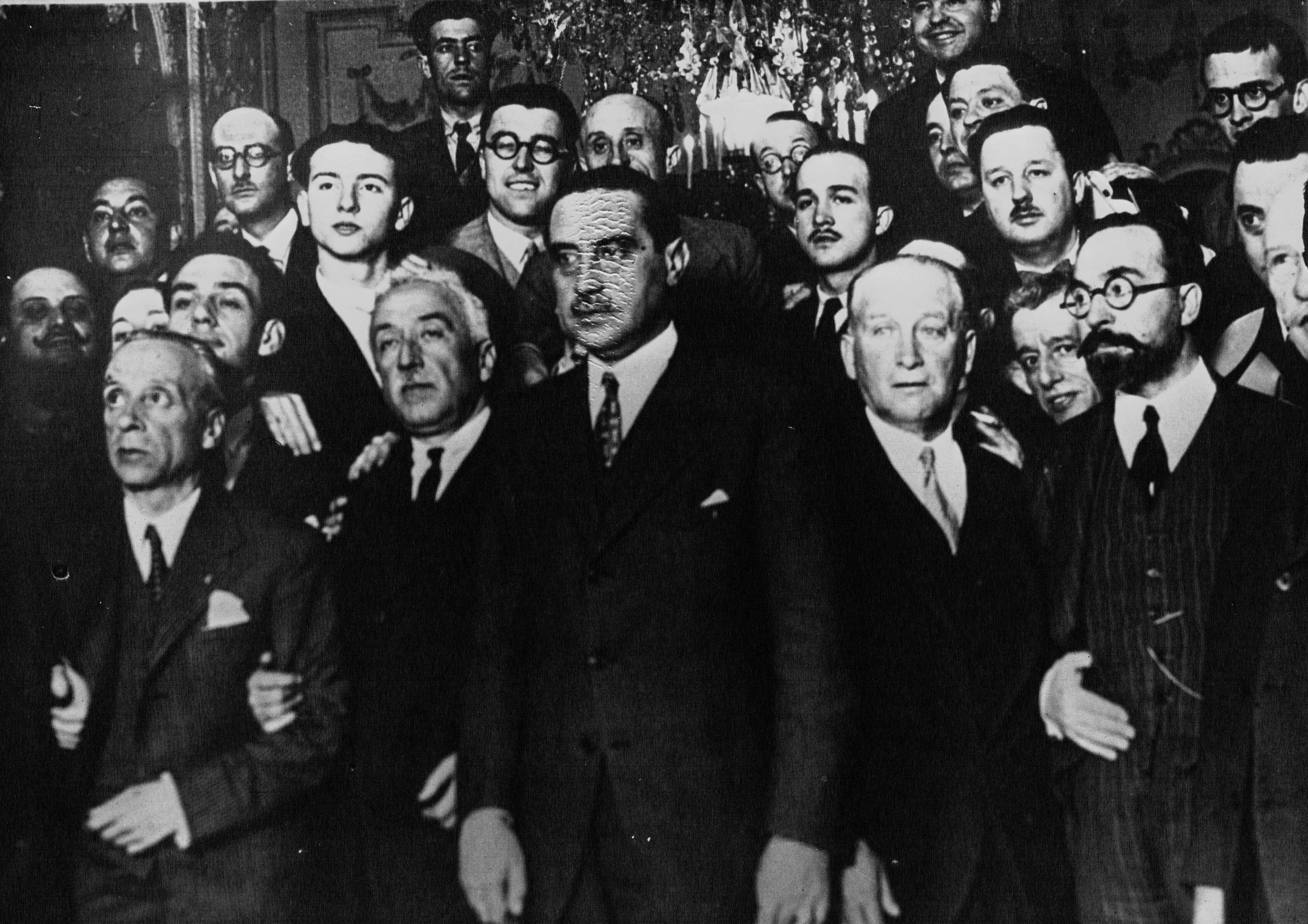
Members of the provisional government of the Second Republic.

The Constituent Cortes was elected in June, and confirmed Alcalá-Zamora as Prime Minister. His cabinet included Manuel Azaña as Minister of War and Maura as Minister of the Interior.

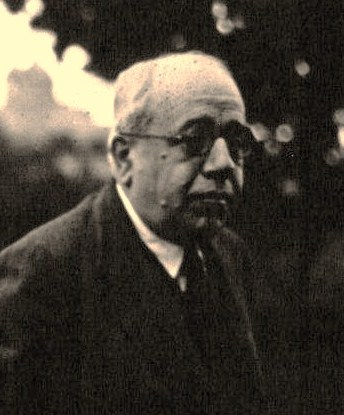
Manuel Azaña

Alcalá-Zamora and Maura both opposed Articles 24 (the Law of Congregations) and 26 (Law of the Court of Constitutional Guarantess) of the new Constitution, which consecrated the separation of church and state and allowed the dissolution of the religious orders that were considered dangerous by the state. Alcalá-Zamora and Maura said that the articles injured their religious feelings as well as those of the Catholic electorates that they represented.

Rather than approve these articles, he resigned on 15 October, along with Maura, and was replaced by Azaña. The constitution was ratified by referendum on 9 December.

Despite this difficulty, on 10 December Alcalá-Zamora was elected President of the Republic by the Constituent Cortes, with 362 votes out of the 410 deputies present (36 deputies were absent). Azaña continued as Prime Minister, which disappointed conservatives.

Presidential Standard of Niceto Alcalá-Zamora (1931–1936)

By 1933, Azaña's extreme anti-clerical policy had alienated moderates, and the conservative parties had recovered from the fall of the monarchy. Azaña lost a vote of confidence in September and resigned. Alcalá-Zamora dissolved the Constituent Cortes, which cost him critical support from the left, and on 8 October called for elections to the Cortes.

The elections of November 1933 gave victory to the right to which Alcalá-Zamora was very hostile, with constant institutional confrontations throughout its term in office. The party with the highest number of votes was the Confederación Española de Derechas Autónomas (CEDA), but it did not have enough seats to govern on its own. Alcalá-Zamora refused to appoint CEDA leader José María Gil-Robles as prime minister and instead appointed Radical leader Alejandro Lerroux, who governed with CEDA support. In October 1934, Gil-Robles obtained two ministerial portfolios for CEDA; the following March, he acquired three more but at first stopped short of trying to obtain the office of prime minister. In the end, he decided to try for that post, after Lerroux resigned in disgrace in September 1935. Alcala-Zamora dissolved the Cortes on 7 January 1936, specifically to avoid that outcome.

The dissolution triggered new elections to the Cortes. The left-wing Popular Front won a narrow majority in the new Cortes. Azaña became prime minister.

The Left then exploited a constitutional loophole. The Cortes could remove the President from office after two early dissolutions. The 1933 dissolution had been partially justified because the mission of had been fulfilled, but the 1936 dissolution was portrayed as an arbitrary move to trigger early elections. Even though elections were clearly required to resolve the collapse of the Lerroux government, and the Left had called for elections, the Left applied this provision. The Cortes dismissed the President on 7 April, and elected Azaña to the vacant position. Azaña was detested by the Right, and Zamora's removal was a watershed moment since many Spaniards gave up on parliamentary politics.

== Final years and death ==
The beginning of the Spanish Civil War surprised Alcalá-Zamora, who was then on a trip to Scandinavia. He decided to stay away from Spain when he found out that militiamen of the Popular Front government had illegally entered his home, stolen his belongings and plundered his safe-deposit box in the Madrid branch of the Crédit Lyonnais bank, taking the manuscript of his memoirs.

When World War II began, Alcalá-Zamora was in France. The German occupation and the collaborationist attitude of the Vichy government caused him to go to Argentina in January 1942. There, he lived on money derived from his books, articles, and conferences. An offer was allegedly made to him that he would be left unmolested if he returned since one of his sons was married to a daughter of General Gonzalo Queipo de Llano, one of the leaders of the uprising. If the offer ever occurred, it came to naught because he did not want to return to Spain under Franco.

Alcalá-Zamora died in Buenos Aires in 1949. His body was returned to Spain in 1979 and was interred in Madrid's Cementerio de la Almudena.

== Marriage and family ==
Ancestral coat of arms

He was married to María de la Purificación Castillo Bidaburu, and had children, including:

- Niceto Alcalá-Zamora y Castillo (1906–1985), married to Ernestina Queipo de Llano y Martí, daughter of Gonzalo Queipo de Llano and Genoveva Martí y Tovar, and had issue:
  - José Alcalá-Zamora y Queipo de Llano, married to Aurora Horfelina Fernández y Mier (1 October 1942 – 29 May 2008), daughter of Vicente Isidro Fernández y Bascarán (1st Viscount of San Claudio and 1st Lord of Olvera], of the Dukes of Castellón de la Plana and first cousin once removed of Brigadier General Cristóbal Martínez-Bordiú) and wife María Marcela Mier y López, and had issue:
    - Gonzalo Alcalá-Zamora y Fernández-Mier.
    - Lucía Alcalá-Zamora y Fernández-Mier.

== See also ==
- Second biennium of the Second Spanish Republic

== Bibliography ==
- Payne, Stanley G. (2017). Alcalá Zamora and the Failure of the Spanish Republic, 1931–1936. Sussex Academic Press. ISBN 978-1-78284-399-3.

Political offices
Preceded by None, inaugural holder	President of the Republic; 1931–1936	Succeeded by Manuel Azaña
Preceded by Alfonso XIII (as King of Spain)	Spanish Head of State; 1931–1936	Succeeded by Manuel Azaña
