= Spanish Civil War =

1936–1939 civil war in Spain

- Part of the interwar period and prelude to World War II
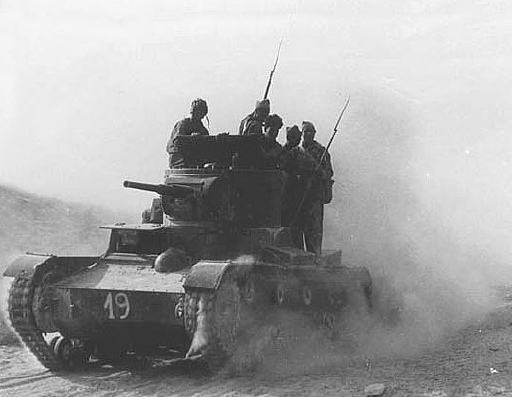
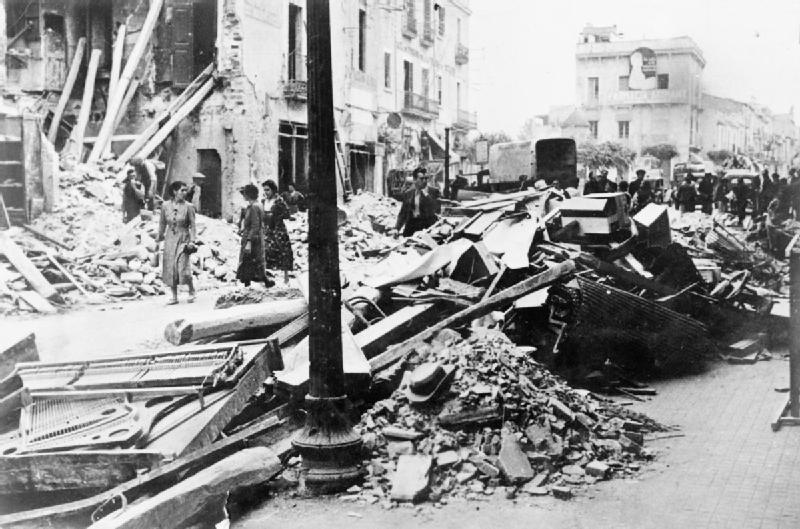
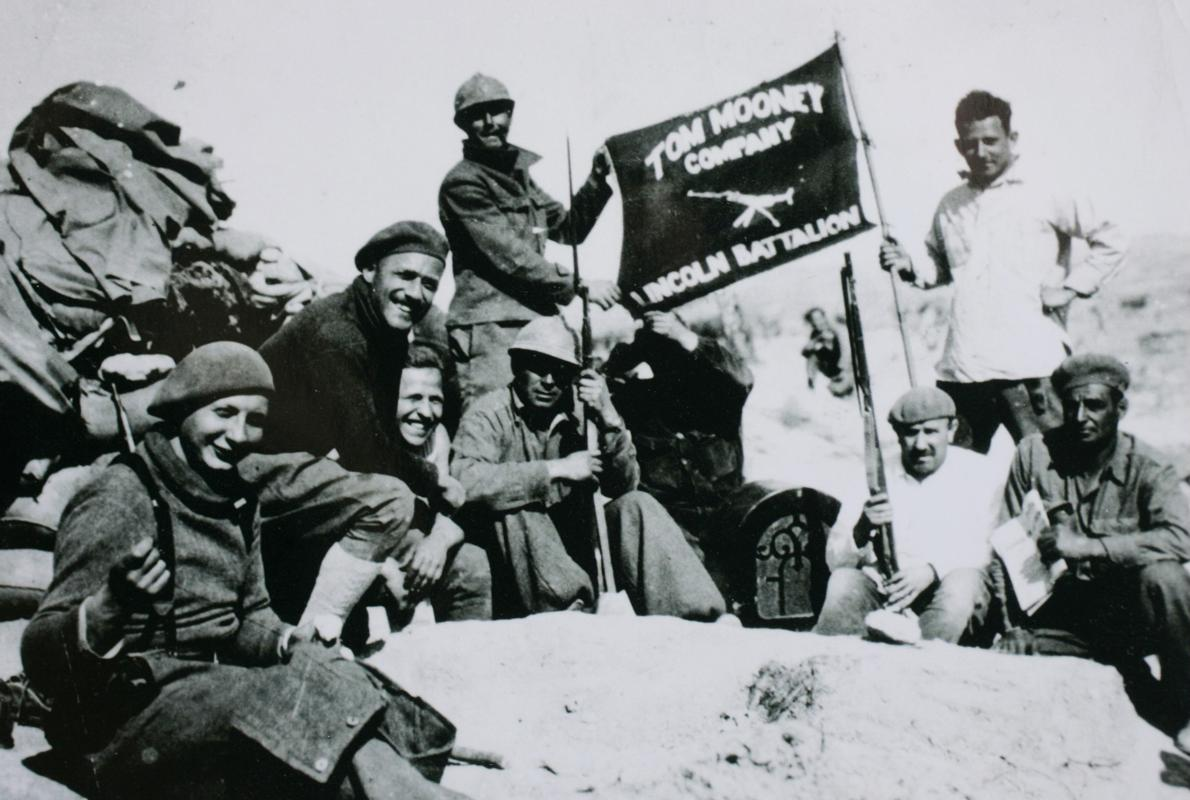
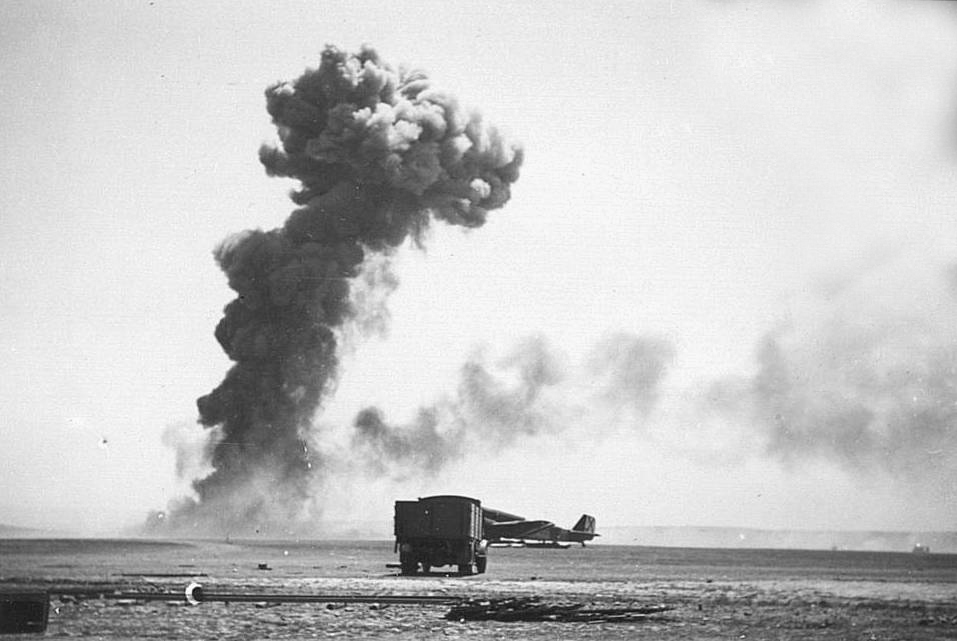
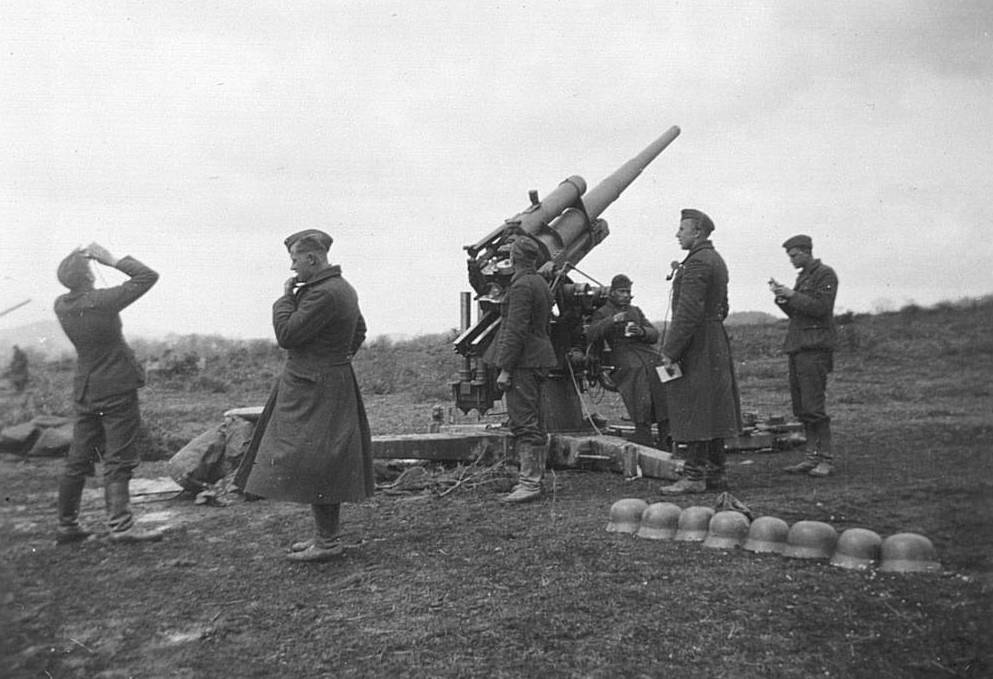
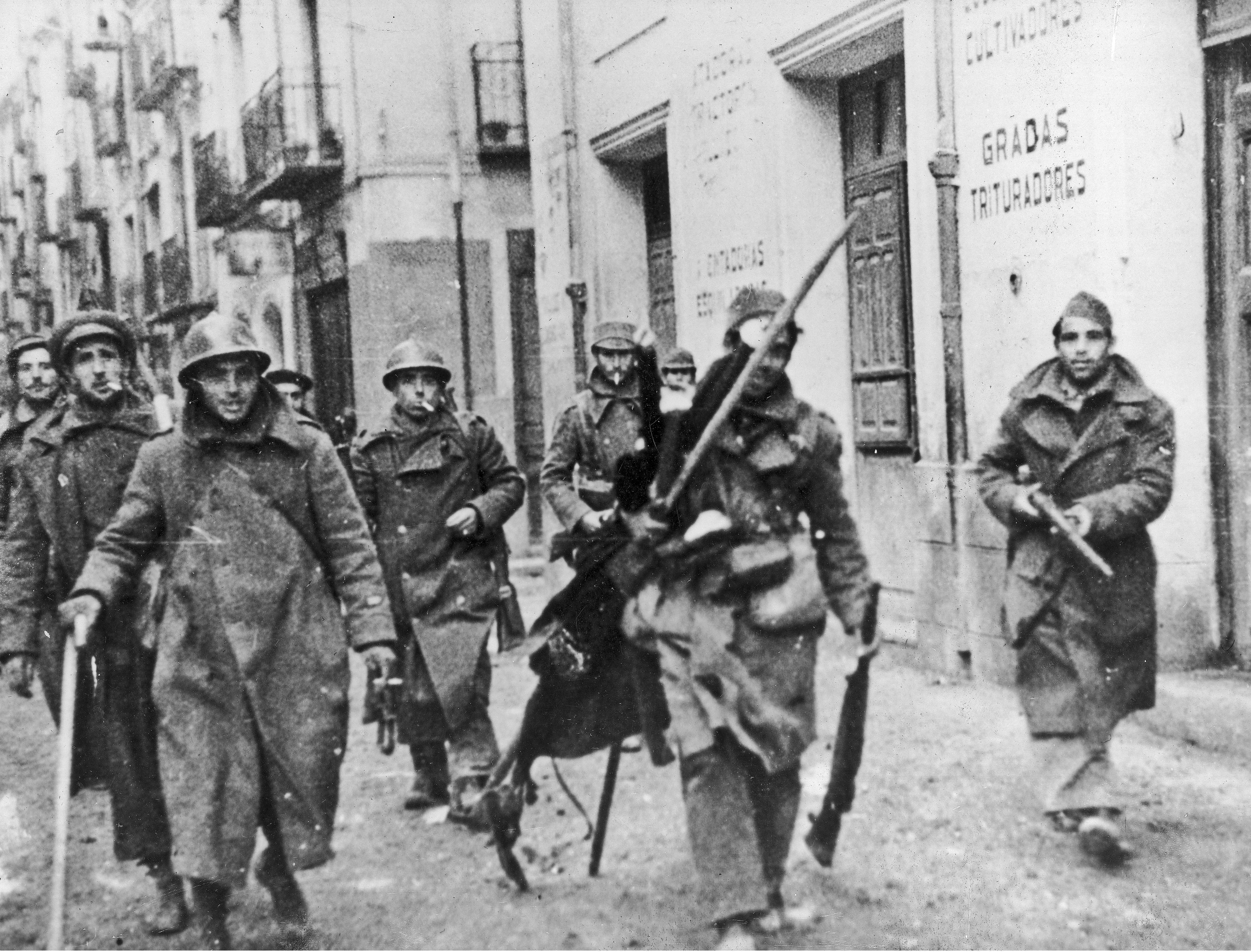
- Clockwise from top-left: Members of the XI International Brigade on a T-26 at the Battle of Belchite; Granollers after being bombed by the Aviazione Legionaria in 1938; Republican soldiers at the Battle of Teruel; Bombing of an airfield in Spanish Morocco; Nationalist soldiers operating an anti-aircraft gun; The Lincoln Battalion
Date	17 July 1936 – 1 April 1939
Location	Spain; Morocco; Western Sahara; Guinea
Result	Nationalist victory
Territorial changes	Establishment of the Spanish State under the rule of Francisco Franco and end of the Second Spanish Republic

Belligerents
Republicans: Spanish Republic; People's Army; Popular Front; UGT; CNT-FAI; POUM (Note: The POUM fought in the Spanish Civil War from 17 July 1936 until 16 June 1937, when the POUM was illegalized and suppressed by the Popular Front Republican government led by Prime Minister Juan Negrín, with the government suppression of the POUM supported by Joseph Stalin, the Comintern and the PCE.); Generalitat de Catalunya / Revolutionary Catalonia; People's Army of Catalonia; Estat Català (Note: Despite not being part of the Popular Front nor of the Catalan Government, Estat Català supported the Generalitat and raised its own milita to contribute to the Republican war effort.); Regional Defence Council of Aragon; Popular Executive Committee of Valencia; Sovereign Council of Asturias and León; Málaga Public Health Committee; Euzko Gudarostea (Note: The Euzko Gudarostea fought in the Spanish Civil War from 17 July 1936 until it surrendered to the Italian Corpo Truppe Volontarie in the Santoña Agreement on 24 August 1937.); Madrid Defense Council; Foreign volunteers; Soviet Union; Mexico	Nationalists: Spanish State; National Army; Spanish Military Union; FET y de las JONS (Note: The only party under Francisco Franco from 1937 onward, a merger of the other factions on the Nationalist side.); FE de las JONS (Note: 1936–1937, then merged into FET y de las JONS); Requetés/CT; Army of Africa; CEDA; Spanish Renovation; Foreign volunteers; Viriatos; Irish Brigade; Joan of Arc Battalion; Legion of White Volunteers; Italy; Germany

Commanders and leaders
Manuel Azaña; Francisco Largo Caballero; Juan Negrín; Indalecio Prieto; Segismundo Casado; Vicente Rojo Lluch; Toribio Martínez Cabrera (executed); José Miaja; Juan Modesto; Juan Hernández Saravia; Dolores Ibárruri; Buenaventura Durruti †; Joaquín Ascaso; Lluís Companys (executed); (Basque Country (autonomous community)) José Antonio Aguirre	Francisco Franco; Emilio Mola †; José Sanjurjo †; Gonzalo Queipo de Llano; Juan Yagüe; Miguel Cabanellas #; José Enrique Varela; Fidel Dávila Arrondo; Francisco Gómez-Jordana; José Antonio Primo de Rivera (executed); Manuel Hedilla; Manuel Fal Conde; Manuel Goded Llopis (executed); Mohammed ben Mizzian

Strength
1936 strength: 446,800 combatants; 31 ships; 12 submarines; 13,000 sailors; 1938 strength: 450,000 infantry; 350 aircraft; 200 tanks; 59,380 international volunteers; 3,015 Soviet technicians; 772 Soviet pilots	1936 strength: 58,000 soldiers; 68,500 gendarmes; 1,500 cavalry and self defense groups; 350 Mercenaries; 16 operational ships; 7,000 sailors; 1938 strength: 600,000 infantry; 600 aircraft; 290 tanks; 70,000–75,000 Italian troops; 16,000 German troops; 8,000–20,000 Portuguese volunteers

Casualties and losses
110,000 killed in action (including executions); 50,000–200,000 civilians killed inside the Nationalist zone	90,000 killed in action (including executions); 38,000–110,965 civilians killed inside the Republican zone
- Estimates differ widely (Note: See Death toll section.)

The Spanish Civil War (Spanish: guerra civil española) (Note: Also known as The Crusade (Spanish: La Cruzada) or The Revolution (Spanish: La Revolución) among Nationalists, the Fourth Carlist War (Spanish: Cuarta Guerra Carlista) among Carlists, and The Rebellion (Spanish: La Rebelión) or The Uprising (Spanish: La Sublevación) among Republicans.) was fought in Spain from 1936 to 1939 between the Republicans and the Nationalist rebels. Republicans loyal to the left-leaning Popular Front government of the Second Spanish Republic included socialists, anarchists, communists, and separatists, supported by the Soviet Union. The opposing Nationalists were an alliance of Falangists, monarchists, conservatives, and traditionalists, who established the military-led Spanish State and were directly aided by an intervention from Fascist Italy and participation of Nazi Germany. Due to the international political climate at the time, the war was variously viewed as class struggle, religious struggle, or struggle between republican democracy and dictatorship, revolution and counterrevolution, or communism and fascism. The Nationalists won the war in early 1939, and ruled Spain until Franco's death in November 1975.

The war began after the partial failure of the coup d'état of July 1936 against the Popular Front government by a group of generals of the Spanish Republican Armed Forces. They were supported by right-wing groups including the Christian traditionalist party CEDA; monarchists, including both the opposing Alfonsists and the religious conservative Carlists; and the Falange Española de las JONS, a fascist political party. However, rebelling units in almost all important cities did not gain control, leaving Spain militarily and politically divided.

The Nationalists were initially led by a military junta, until General Francisco Franco was appointed supreme leader on 1 October 1936 of what he called the Spanish State. The rebellion was countered by the arming of left-wing social movements and parties, and the formation of militias. This led to rapid socioeconomic and political transformation in the Republican zone, referred to as the Spanish Revolution. The Nationalist forces received munitions, soldiers, and air support from Fascist Italy which conducted a large-scale intervention and Nazi Germany which sent its Condor Legion, while the Republican government received support from the Soviet Union and Mexico. Other countries, such as the United Kingdom, France, and the United States, continued to recognise the Republican government, but followed official policies of non-intervention. Despite this, tens of thousands of citizens from non-interventionist countries directly participated in the conflict, mostly in the pro-Republican International Brigades.

Franco gradually emerged as the primary leader of the Nationalists, becoming the dictator of the Spanish State by 1937 and co-opting Falangism, gaining recognition as a fascist leader. The Nationalists advanced from their strongholds in the south and west, capturing most of Spain's northern coastline in 1937 and besieging Madrid. After much of Catalonia was captured in 1938 and 1939 and Madrid was cut off from Barcelona, the Republican military position became hopeless. On 5 March 1939, in response to allegedly increasing communist dominance of the Republican government and the deteriorating military situation, Colonel Segismundo Casado led a military coup against the Republican government, intending to seek peace with the Nationalists. These peace overtures, however, were rejected by Franco. Following internal conflict between Republican factions in Madrid in the same month, Franco entered the capital and declared victory on 1 April 1939. Hundreds of thousands of those associated with the Republicans fled Spain, mostly to refugee camps in southern France; many of those who stayed were persecuted by the victorious Nationalists.

The war became notable for the passion and political division it inspired worldwide, and for the many atrocities that occurred. Organised purges occurred in territory captured by Franco's forces to consolidate power. Mass executions took place in areas controlled by the Republicans, with the participation of local authorities varying by location.

== Background ==
=== First Republic and restoration ===
In 1868, popular uprisings led to the overthrow of Queen Isabella II. In 1873, Isabella's replacement, King Amadeo I of the House of Savoy abdicated, and the short-lived First Spanish Republic was proclaimed. The First Republic was marred with political instability and conflicts, and was quickly overthrown by General Arsenio Martínez Campos in December 1874, after which the monarchy was restored in the figure of Alfonso XII, Isabella's son.

After the restoration, Carlists and anarchists emerged in opposition to the monarchy. Alejandro Lerroux, Spanish politician and leader of the Radical Republican Party, helped to bring republicanism to the fore in Catalonia. Conscription was a controversial policy that was eventually implemented by the government of Spain. As evidenced by the Tragic Week in 1909, resentment and resistance continued well into the 20th century.

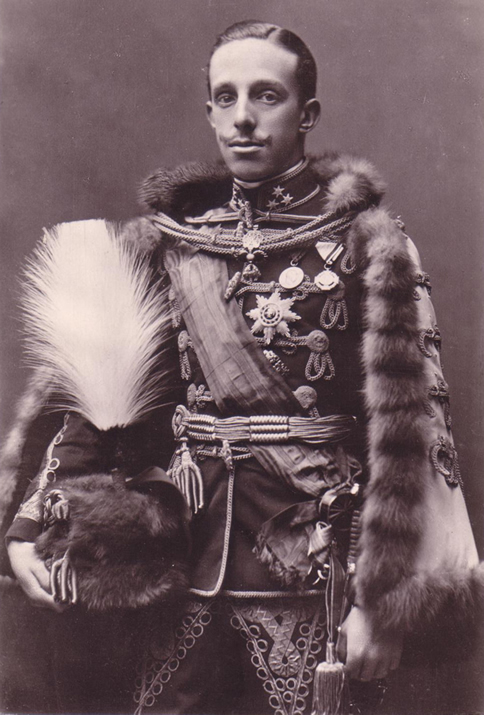
On 12 April 1931, the Republicans won the elections and the Second Spanish Republic was proclaimed two days later. King Alfonso XIII went into exile.

Spain was neutral in World War I. Following the war, wide swathes of Spanish society, including the armed forces, united in hopes of removing the corrupt central government in Madrid, but these efforts were ultimately unsuccessful. Popular perception of communism as a major threat significantly increased during this period.

=== Dictatorship of Primo de Rivera ===
In 1923, another military coup brought Miguel Primo de Rivera to power, transitioning Spain to government by military dictatorship. Support for the Rivera regime gradually faded, and he resigned in January 1930. He was replaced by General Dámaso Berenguer, who was in turn himself replaced by Admiral Juan Bautista Aznar-Cabañas; both men continued a policy of rule by decree.

There was little support for the monarchy in the major cities. Consequently, King Alfonso XIII of Spain, relenting to popular pressure for a greater voice, called municipal elections for 12 April 1931. Left-wing entities such as the Socialists and Liberal Republicans won almost all the provincial capitals and, following the resignation of the government of Aznar-Cabañas, Alfonso XIII fled the country. The Second Spanish Republic was formed and remained in place for five years until the Spanish Civil War commenced.

=== Second Republic ===
The revolutionary committee headed by Niceto Alcalá-Zamora became the provisional government, with Alcalá-Zamora himself as president and head of state. The republic had broad support from all segments of society.

However, according to José Ángel Sánchez Asiaín, the first plans of a counter-revolution against the Republic were discussed on the day when it was proclaimed, when representatives of monarchist circles, José Antonio Primo de Rivera, the future leader of the Falange, and José Calvo Sotelo, one of the future leaders of the monarchist party Spanish Renovation, "met to lay down the financial foundations for subverting the Republic." An immediate action did not follow, but by March 1934 the conspirators would convince Benito Mussolini, the leader of Fascist Italy, to agree to aid a future coup.

In May 1931, an incident in which a taxi driver was attacked outside a monarchist club sparked anti-clerical violence throughout Madrid and the south-west regions of the country. The slow response on the part of the government disillusioned the right. In June and July, the Confederación Nacional del Trabajo (CNT) called several strikes, leading to a violent incident between CNT members and the Civil Guard, and a brutal crackdown by the Civil Guard and the Spanish Army against the CNT in Seville. This led many workers to believe the Second Spanish Republic was just as oppressive as the monarchy, and the CNT announced its intention of overthrowing it by starting a revolution.

==== Constituent Cortes and left-wing government (1931–1933) ====
Elections in June 1931 returned to office a large majority of Republicans and Socialists. With the onset of the Great Depression, the government tried to assist rural areas of Spain by instituting an eight-hour day and redistributing land tenure to farm workers. Newly established labour arbitration boards regulated salaries, contracts, and working hours, but were more favourable to workers than employers. Class struggle intensified as landowners turned to counterrevolutionary organisations and local oligarchs to maintain control. Strikes, workplace theft, arson, robbery and assaults on shops, strikebreakers, employers, and machines became increasingly common.

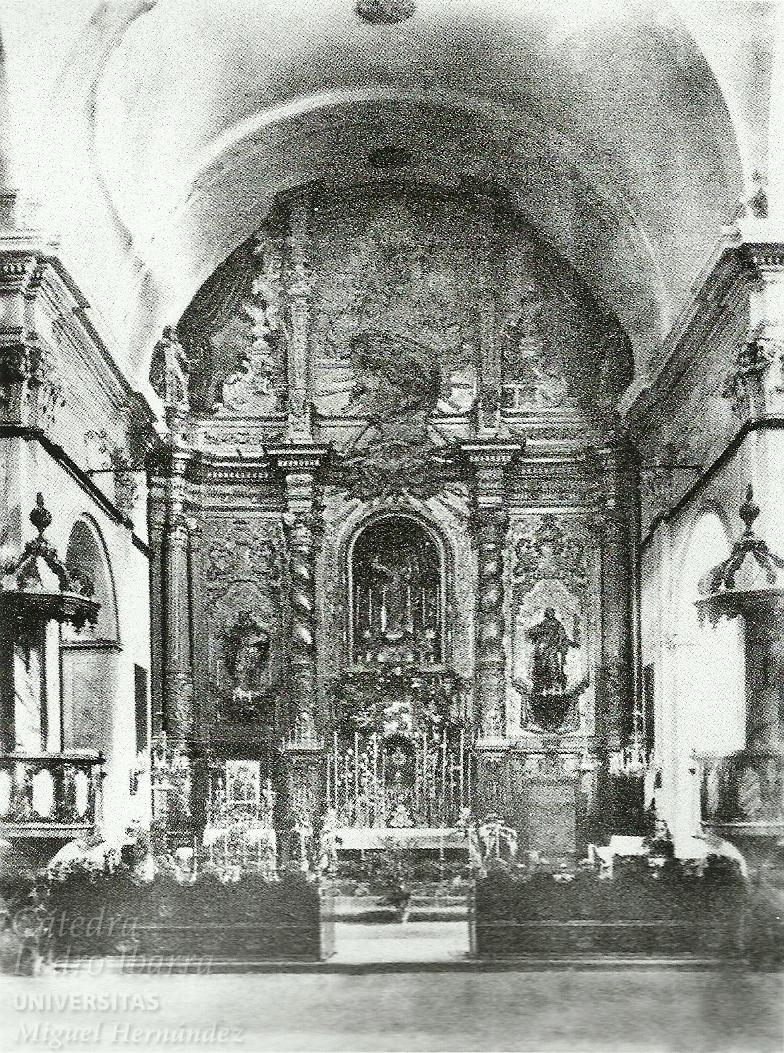
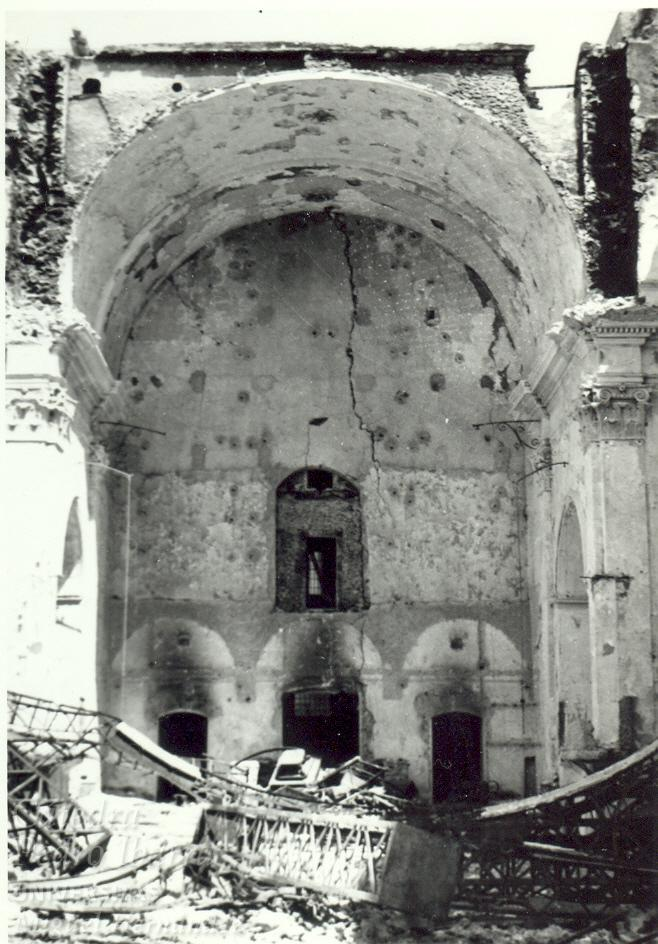
The Church was a frequent target of the revolutionary left in the republic and in the war. During the Civil War, revolutionaries destroyed or burned some 20,000 churches, along with church artwork and tombs, books, archives, and palaces. A vast number of affected buildings remain defunct. The church in the picture, in Elche was burned during the initial stages of the war.

Republican Manuel Azaña became prime minister of a minority government in October 1931. In December, a new reformist, liberal and democratic constitution was declared. It included strong provisions enforcing a broad secularisation of the Catholic country, which included the abolition of Catholic schools and charities, a move which was met with opposition.

The first military coup against the Republic was planned by groups of monarchist generals with the support of exiled monarchist ministers, including Calvo Sotelo. The attempted coup which became known as Sanjurjada ended in failure. Several hundred generals were dismissed, prominent monarchists were imprisoned or had to flee abroad, and the aristocracy was 'punished' with radicalization of the agrarian reform. The coup contributed to the radicalization of the left.

The extreme right did not abandon their plans for overthrowing the Republic, as manifested in the foundation of the Spanish Renovation and a small fascist party Falange Española, the rise of the militant Carlist movement (Traditionalist Communion, Requeté militias), and propaganda of legitimacy of a military uprising spread by such organizations as Acción Española. Fascism lacked broad popular support, but historians Julián Casanova describe the culture of the Spanish anti-Republican right as proto-fascist, similar to Italian "pre-Fascism" and the German Völkisch movement. The anti-Republican right was supported within the Church, especially by its Integrist groups, and the army. At the same time, the authority of the Republic was also undermined by an anarchist insurrection which culminated in the Casas Viejas massacre of the anarchists and was followed by state repression.

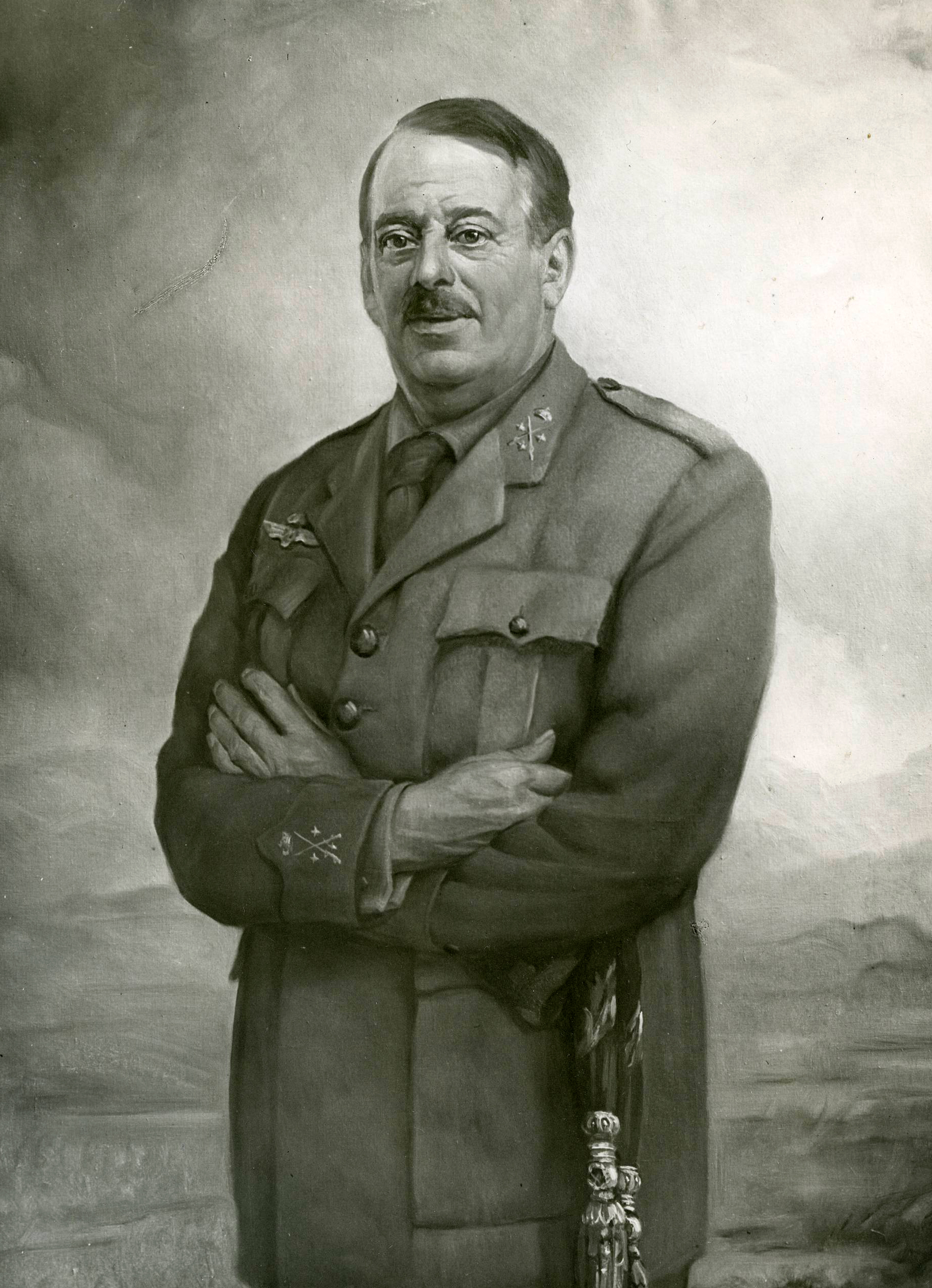
General José Sanjurjo, the leader of the failed 1932 military coup. Having been granted amnesty in 1934 by the right-wing government of the Republic, he was one of the leaders of the 1936 coup.

==== Right-wing government (1933–1935) ====
In November 1933, right-wing parties won the general election. The causal factors included increased resentment of the incumbent government due to its inability to counter pressure from the employers' associations, economic instability, including the failure of the agrarian reform to significantly improve the living conditions of rural labourers; the recent enfranchisement of women in Spain, most of whom voted for centre-right parties, the breakup of the coalition between the Radical Republican Party and the Socialists, the failure of the left to form an electoral coalition similar to the one of the Radicals and the right, and the opposition of the anarchists to the Socialists following the Casas Viejas incident. Earlier the anarchists had voted for left-wing parties, yet during the 1933 elections they either voted for the Radicals or abstained. Among the members of the victorious coalition was a new party, the Spanish Confederation of Autonomous Right-wing Groups (CEDA). The left viewed the CEDA not only as a threat to their progressive reforms, but to the Republic in general, and specifically as a fascist party. The CEDA and its leader Gil Robles proclaimed their goals to dissolve workers' movements and parliamentary democracy, purge "Marxists, Freemasons, Separatists and Jews", and establish an authoritarian corporate state, praising Benito Mussolini of Fascist Italy, Adolf Hitler of Nazi Germany and Engelbert Dollfuss of the Austrian Ständestaat. While Gil Robles rejected such aspects of fascism as reliance on violence, his criticism of fascism was poorly received by his own followers. The left rejected the validity of the election results on the grounds that the Socialists gained more votes than any party of the Radical-right coalition, and that the elections in southern areas were subject to alleged malpractice, and such possible violations as harassment of the voters by employers and right-wing groups. They unsuccessfully attempted to have President Niceto Alcalá-Zamora cancel the electoral results. Concerned about CEDA's monarchist leanings and its plans to alter the constitution, he asked the Radical Party leader Alejandro Lerroux to form a government instead of Gil Robles of CEDA, the largest party in parliament. Although CEDA did not formally join Lerroux's cabinet, it exerted indirect influence because the coalition government depended on its parliamentary support. CEDA reinforced this leverage by threatening to withdraw cooperation. Later, Gil Robles claimed that the Radicals were “carrying out CEDA's programme.”

Events in the period after November 1933, called the "black biennium", seemed to make a civil war more likely. Alejandro Lerroux of the Radical Republican Party (RRP) formed a government, reversing changes made by the previous administration and granting amnesty to Sanjurjo and his collaborators. The Civil Guard adopted "preventive brutality" against workers' movements. Some monarchists joined with the newly formed Falange Española y de las JONS ("Falange") to help achieve their aims. Through Antonio Goicoechea, who would later play a role in the Italian intervention in the Civil War, in 1934 a group of monarchist conspirators within the army reached an agreement with Benito Mussolini, who had supported contacts with anti-Republican circles since 1932 and promised to supply weapons to the plotters and subsidized the Falange. The defeat in the elections and its consequences led to disenchantment with parliamentarism and radicalization of the Socialists. The increasing militancy within the Socialist workers was followed by Francisco Largo Caballero's adopting revolutionary Marxist rhetoric which justified revolutionism as a way to combat rising fascism, uncharacteristic of European social democratic mainstream and the reformist traditions of the PSOE. The CNT adopted a similar rhetoric in the wake of the elections, threatening with a revolution if "Fascist tendencies" would win the elections. Open violence occurred in the streets of Spanish cities, and militancy continued to increase, reflecting a movement towards radical upheaval, rather than peaceful means to achieve solutions. A small insurrection by anarchists occurred in December 1933 in response to CEDA's victory, in which around 100 people died.

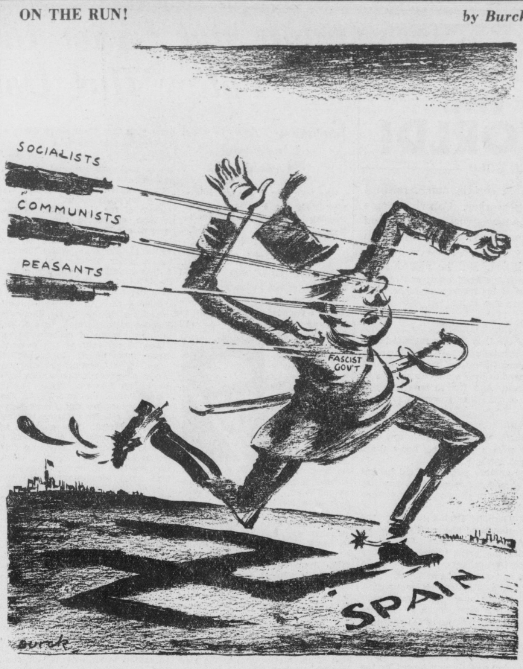
"On the Run!" Daily Worker October 10, 1934

Socialists led by Largo Caballero decided to launch a 'revolution' if the CEDA entered the government, something, according to Paul Preston, Largo Caballero believed would never happen; this decision was known within the government. The Socialists continued calling local economic strikes, admitting their lack of preparation for actual revolutionary actions, while Gil Robles and his supporter Rafael Salazar Alonso, the Minister of the Interior, stressed the need to provoke the "revolution" "before it is well prepared." The government increased repression against Socialists, deporting their supporters, and entered censorship, justifying its measures with an alleged threat of a revolutionary strike. The preparations of the Socialists for a possible insurrection had been no secret and was easily suppressed by the police. General Francisco Franco was called to conduct military exercises coinciding with a coming uprising. On 1 October, Largo Caballero resigned as the President of the PSOE and its revolutionary committee. On 4 October, Lerroux formed a government with three members of the CEDA. The insurrection launched in response became known as the Revolution of 1934. In most of Spain, it was suppressed with little resistance, with the Socialist leadership demonstrating its lack of preparation and will to fulfill their revolutionary threats. However, major action took place in the province of Asturias in what became known as the Asturian Revolution of 1934.

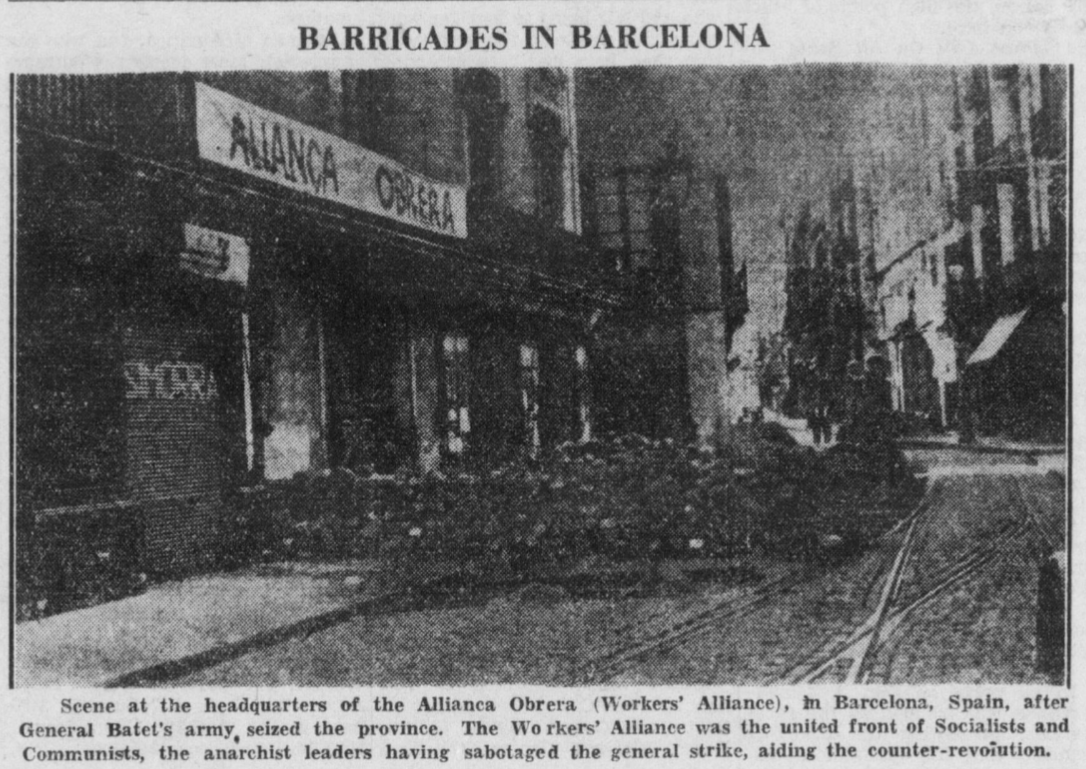
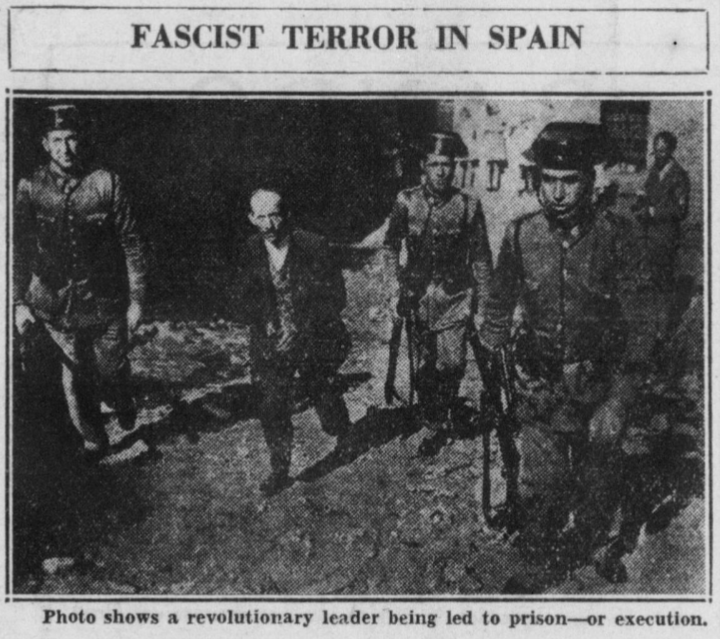
Images from the Revolution of 1934

Fairly well armed revolutionaries managed to take the whole province of Asturias, killing numerous policemen, clergymen and civilians, destroying religious buildings including churches, convents and part of the university at Oviedo. Rebels in the occupied areas proclaimed revolution for the workers and abolished the existing currency. The uprising was crushed in two weeks by the Spanish Navy and the Spanish Republican Army, the latter using mainly Moorish colonial troops from Spanish Morocco. Although Azaña was in Barcelona that day, and the Lerroux-CEDA government tried to implicate him. He was arrested and charged with complicity. In fact, Azaña had no connection with the uprising and was released from prison in January 1935.

Reversals of land reform resulted in expulsions, firings and arbitrary changes to working conditions in the central and southern countryside in 1935, with landowners' behaviour at times reaching "genuine cruelty", which included violence against farmworkers and socialists, causing several deaths. One historian argued that the behaviour of the right in the southern countryside was one of the main causes of hatred during the Civil War and possibly even the Civil War itself. Landowners taunted workers by saying that if they went hungry, they should "Go eat the Republic!" Bosses fired leftist workers and imprisoned trade union and socialist militants; wages were reduced to "salaries of hunger".

In 1935, the government, led by the Radical Republican Party, had now endured a series of crises. After a number of corruption scandals, President Niceto Alcalá-Zamora, himself hostile to this government, called another election.

==== Popular Front's victory and escalation 1936 ====
The left-wing Popular Front narrowly won the 1936 general election. The revolutionary left-wing masses took to the streets and freed prisoners. In the thirty-six hours following the election, sixteen people were killed and thirty-nine were seriously injured. Additionally, fifty churches and seventy conservative political centres were attacked or set ablaze. Manuel Azaña was called to form a government before the electoral process had ended. He shortly replaced Alcala-Zamora as president, taking advantage of a constitutional loophole. Convinced that the left was no longer willing to follow the rule of law and that its vision of Spain was under threat, the right abandoned the parliamentary option and began enacting plans to overthrow rather than to control the republic. Disenchantment with Azaña's rule was also voiced by Miguel de Unamuno, a Republican and one of Spain's most respected intellectuals who, in June 1936, told a reporter that President Manuel Azaña should commit suicide "as a patriotic act".

Laia Balcells observes that polarisation in Spain just before the coup was so intense that physical confrontations between leftists and rightists were a routine occurrence in most localities; six days before the coup occurred, there was a riot between the two in Teruel. Balcells notes that Spanish society was so divided along Left-Right lines that the monk Hilari Raguer stated that in his parish, instead of playing "cops and robbers", children would sometimes play "leftists and rightists". Within the first month of the Popular Front's government, nearly a quarter of the provincial governors had been removed due to their failure to prevent or control strikes, illegal land occupation, political violence and arson. The Popular Front government was more likely to prosecute rightists for violence than leftists who committed similar acts. Between February and July, approximately 300 to 400 deaths occurred from political violence, while hundreds of churches, religious buildings and monuments were destroyed, damaged, or vandalised.

Azaña was hesitant to use the army to shoot or stop rioters or protestors, and he was reluctant to disarm the military as he believed he needed them to stop insurrections from the extreme left. Illegal land occupation became widespread as poor tenant farmers knew the government was disinclined to stop them. By April 1936, nearly 100,000 peasants had appropriated 400,000 hectares of land and perhaps as many as 1 million hectares by the start of the civil war; for comparison, the 1931–33 land reform had granted only 6,000 peasants 45,000 hectares. As many strikes occurred between April and July as had occurred in the entirety of 1931. Workers increasingly demanded less work and more pay. "Social crimes"—refusing to pay for goods and rent—became increasingly common. In some cases, this was done in the company of armed militants. Conservatives, the middle classes, businessmen and landowners became convinced that revolution had already begun.

Prime Minister Santiago Casares Quiroga ignored warnings of a military conspiracy involving several generals who had decided that the government had to be replaced to prevent the dissolution of Spain. Both sides were convinced that the other would discriminate against their members and attempt to suppress their political organisations.

== Military coup ==
=== Background ===
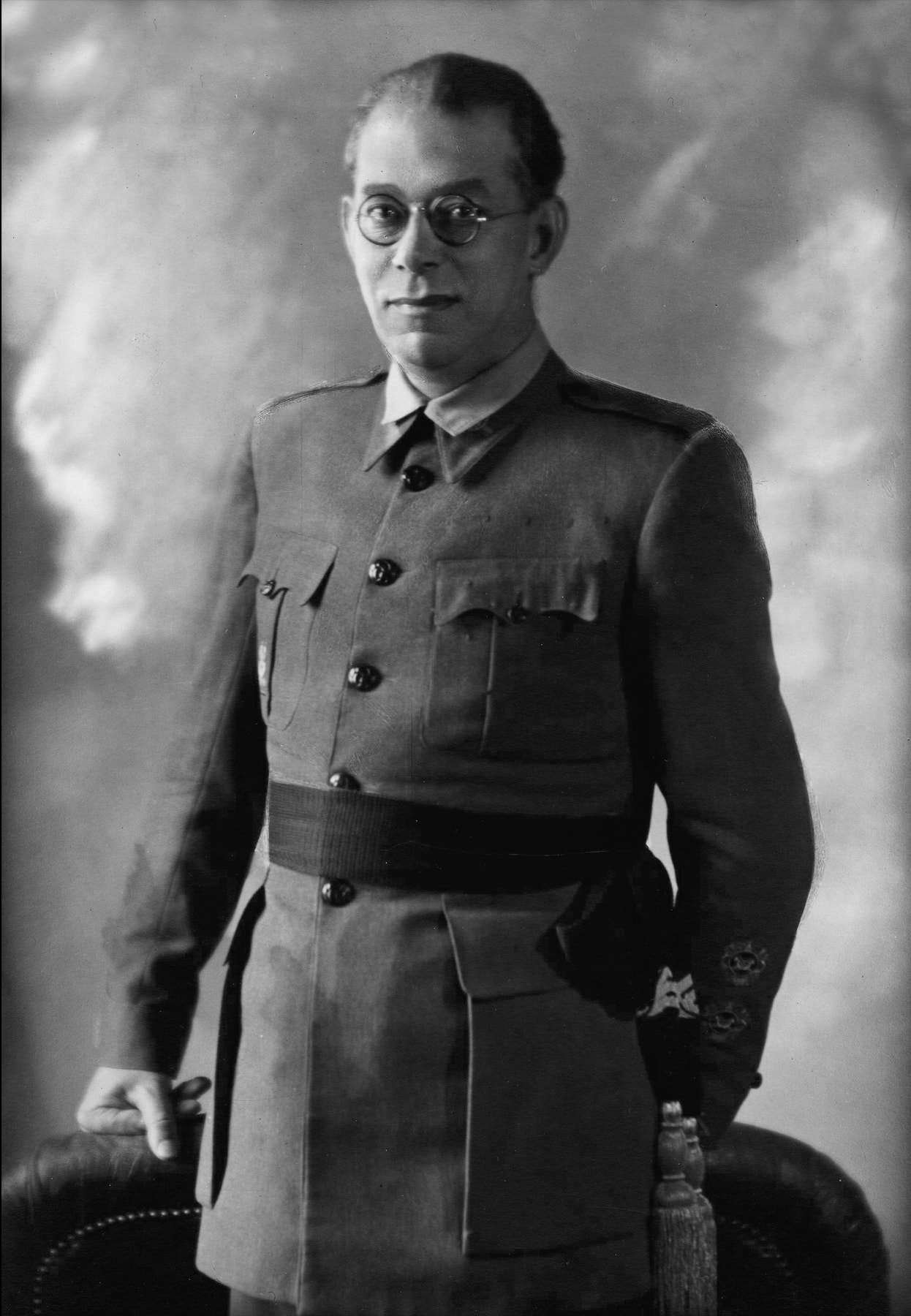
General Emilio Mola was the chief planner of the coup.

Shortly after the Popular Front's victory in the 1936 election, groups of officers, both active and retired, got together to discuss a coup. By the end of April General Emilio Mola emerged as the leader of a national conspiracy network. The Republican government reacted by reshuffling suspect generals from influential posts, Azaña however acutely aware that as he did so, the Army still served as a possible buffer to leftist power brokers threatening his government. Franco was sacked as chief of staff and transferred to command of the Canary Islands. Manuel Goded Llopis was removed as inspector general and made general of the Balearic Islands. Mola was moved from head of the Army of Africa to commander of Pamplona. This latter reassignment, however, allowed Mola to direct the mainland uprising; General José Sanjurjo became the figurehead of the operation and helped reach an agreement with the Carlists, Mola was chief planner and second in command. José Antonio Primo de Rivera was put in prison in mid-March to restrict the Falange. However, government actions were not as thorough as they might have been, and warnings by the Director of Security and other figures were not acted upon.

Mola's plan for the new regime was a "republican dictatorship", modelled after Salazar's Portugal and along the lines of being semi-pluralist authoritarian, rather than fascist totalitarian. The initial government would be an all-military "Directory", which would create a "strong and disciplined state". Sanjurjo would be the head of this new regime, due to being liked and respected within the military, though his position would be symbolic due to his lack of political talent. The 1931 Constitution would be suspended, replaced by a new "constituent parliament" which would be chosen by a new politically purged electorate, who would vote on the issue of republic versus monarchy. Liberal elements would remain, such as separation of church and state as well as freedom of religion. Agrarian issues would be solved by regional commissioners on the basis of smallholdings, but collective cultivation would be permitted in some circumstances. Legislation prior to February 1936 would be respected. Violence would be required to destroy opposition to the coup, though it seems Mola did not envision the mass atrocities and repression that would manifest during the civil war. Of particular importance to Mola was ensuring the revolt was an Army affair, not subject to special interests, ensuring the position of the armed forces as the basis for the new state. However, the separation of church and state was forgotten once the conflict assumed the dimension of a war of religion, and military authorities increasingly deferred to the Church and to the expression of Catholic sentiment. Mola's program was vague and only a rough sketch, and there were disagreements among coupists about their vision.

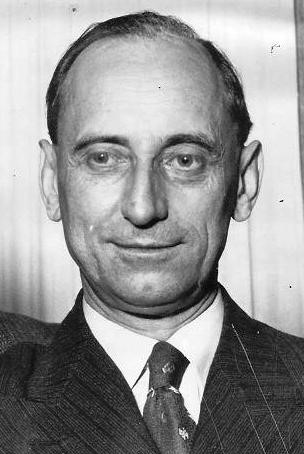
Casares Quiroga was the prime minister in the two months leading up to the coup.

On 12 June, Prime Minister Casares Quiroga met General Juan Yagüe, who falsely convinced Casares of his loyalty to the republic. Mola began planning in the spring. Franco was a key player because of his prestige as a former director of the military academy and as the man who suppressed the Asturian miners' strike of 1934. He was respected in the Army of Africa, the Army's toughest troops. He wrote a cryptic letter to Casares on 23 June, suggesting the military was disloyal, but could be restrained if he were put in charge. Casares did nothing, failing to arrest or buy off Franco. With the help of British intelligence agents, the rebels chartered a Dragon Rapide aircraft to transport Franco from the Canary Islands to Spanish Morocco. Franco arrived in Morocco on 19 July.

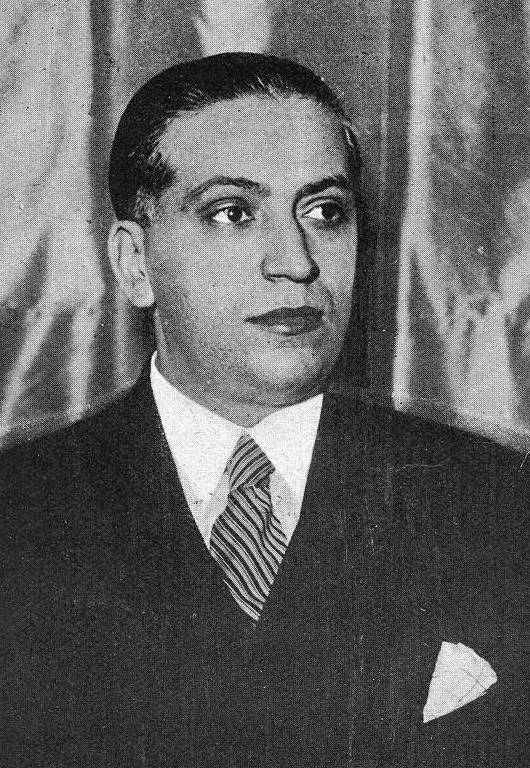
The assassination of José Calvo Sotelo, prominent fascist-leaning parliamentary conservative, was a major catalyst for the coup.

On 12 July 1936, Falangists in Madrid killed police officer Lieutenant José Castillo of the Guardia de Asalto (Assault Guard). Castillo was a Socialist party member who was giving military training to the UGT youth. Castillo had led the Assault Guards that violently suppressed the riots after the funeral of Guardia Civil lieutenant Anastasio de los Reyes. Assault Guard Captain Fernando Condés was a friend of Castillo. The next day, after getting the approval of the minister of interior to illegally arrest members of parliament, he led his squad to arrest José María Gil-Robles y Quiñones, founder of CEDA, as a reprisal for Castillo's murder, but he was not at home, so they went to the house of José Calvo Sotelo, a Spanish fascist-leaning ("filofascist") monarchist and prominent parliamentary conservative. Luis Cuenca, a member of the arresting group and a Socialist who was known as the bodyguard of PSOE leader Indalecio Prieto, summarily executed Sotelo.

Reprisals followed. The killing of Calvo Sotelo with police involvement aroused suspicions and reactions among the government's opponents on the right. Although the nationalist generals were planning an uprising, the event was a catalyst and a public justification for a coup. The kidnapping and murder of Sotelo transformed the "limping conspiracy" into a revolt that could trigger a civil war.

The arbitrary use of lethal force by the state and lack of action against the attackers led to public disapproval of the government. No effective punitive, judicial or even investigative action was taken; Payne points to a possible veto by socialists within the government who shielded the killers drawn from their ranks. The murder of a parliamentary leader by state police was unprecedented, and the belief the state had ceased to be neutral and effective encouraged important sectors of the right to join the rebellion. Franco changed his mind on rebellion and dispatched a message to Mola to display his firm commitment.

The Socialists and Communists, led by Indalecio Prieto, demanded that arms be distributed to the people before the military took over. The prime minister was hesitant.

=== Beginning of the coup ===
General map of the Spanish Civil War (1936–1939). Key: Initial Nationalist zone – July 1936 Nationalist advance until September 1936 Nationalist advance until October 1937 Nationalist advance until November 1938 Nationalist advance until February 1939 Last area under Republican control Main Nationalist centres Main Republican centres / Land battles Naval battles Bombed cities Massacres; Concentration camps Refugee camps

The uprising's timing was fixed at 17 July, at 17:01, agreed to by the leader of the Carlists, Manuel Fal Conde. However, the timing was changed—the men in the Morocco protectorate were to rise up at 05:00 on 18 July and those in Spain proper a day later so that control of Spanish Morocco could be achieved and forces sent back to the Iberian Peninsula to coincide with the risings there. The rising was intended to be a swift coup d'état, but the government retained control of most of the country.

Control over Spanish Morocco was all but certain. The plan was discovered in Morocco on 17 July, which prompted the conspirators to enact it immediately. Little resistance was encountered. The rebels shot 189 people. Goded and Franco immediately took control of the islands to which they were assigned. On 18 July, Casares Quiroga refused an offer of help from the CNT and Unión General de Trabajadores (UGT), leading the groups to proclaim a general strike—in effect, mobilising. They opened weapons caches, some buried since the 1934 risings, and formed militias. The paramilitary security forces often waited for the outcome of militia action before either joining or suppressing the rebellion. Quick action by either the rebels or anarchist militias was often enough to decide the fate of a town. General Gonzalo Queipo de Llano secured Seville for the rebels, arresting a number of other officers.

=== Outcome ===
The rebels failed to take any major cities with the critical exception of the July 1936 military uprising in Seville, which provided a landing point for Franco's African troops, and the primarily conservative and Catholic areas of Old Castile, León and Galicia, which fell quickly. They took Cádiz with help from the first troops from Africa. The "air bridge" between Tetouan and Seville with German planes allowed the Army of Africa to advance towards Extremadura and Madrid.

The government retained control of Málaga, Jaén, and Almería. In Madrid, the rebels were hemmed into the Cuartel de la Montaña siege, which fell with considerable bloodshed. Republican prime minister Casares Quiroga was replaced by José Giral, who ordered the distribution of weapons among the civilian population. This facilitated the defeat of the army insurrection in the main industrial centres, including Madrid, Barcelona, and Valencia, but it allowed anarchists to take control of Barcelona along with large swathes of Aragón and Catalonia. General Goded surrendered in Barcelona and was later condemned to death. The Republican government ended up controlling almost all the east coast and central area around Madrid, as well as most of Asturias, Cantabria and part of the Basque Country in the north.

Hugh Thomas suggested that the civil war could have ended in the favour of either side almost immediately if certain decisions had been taken during the initial coup. Thomas argues that if the government had taken steps to arm the workers, they could probably have crushed the coup very quickly. Conversely, if the coup had risen everywhere in Spain on the 18th rather than be delayed, it could have triumphed by the 22nd. While the militias that rose to meet the rebels were often untrained and poorly armed (possessing only a small number of pistols, shotguns and dynamite), this was offset by the fact that the rebellion was not universal. In addition, the Falangists and Carlists were themselves often not particularly powerful fighters either. However, enough officers and soldiers had joined the coup to prevent it from being crushed swiftly.

The rebels termed themselves Nacionales, normally translated "Nationalists", although the former implies "true Spaniards" rather than a nationalistic cause. The result of the coup was a nationalist area of control containing 11 million of Spain's population of 25 million. The Nationalists had secured the support of around half of Spain's territorial army, some 60,000 men, joined by the Army of Africa, made up of 35,000 men, and just under half of Spain's militaristic police forces, the Assault Guards, the Civil Guards, and the Carabineers. Republicans controlled under half of the rifles and about a third of both machine guns and artillery pieces.

The Spanish Republican Army had just 18 tanks of a sufficiently modern design, and the Nationalists took control of 10. Naval capacity was uneven, with the Republicans retaining a numerical advantage, but with the Navy's top commanders and two of the most modern ships, heavy cruisers Canarias—captured at the Ferrol shipyard—and Baleares, in Nationalist control. The Spanish Republican Navy suffered from the same problems as the army—many officers had defected or been killed after trying to do so. Two-thirds of air capability was retained by the government—however, the whole of the Republican Air Force was very outdated.

== Spanish Revolution ==
Arming the workers' movements and formation of militias, especially in Aragon and Catalonia which were anarchist strongholds, led to a vast social revolution in which the workers and peasants implemented socialist organizational principles, such as collective farming and collective democratic management of the industry and seized economic affairs and political power at local levels. The revolutionary management principles continued to evolve as long as the Republican zone existed, until the end of the civil war with the victory of the Nationalists. While the revolution did not overthrow the Republican parliamentary state, initially the revolutionaries regarded it as a means of maintaining foreign relations and propaganda rather than an actual authority, and it was paralyzed, while the power was held by local committees and councils parallel to the Republican government. This socioeconomic and political transformation is referred to as the Spanish Revolution or the July Revolution.

The revolution was pluralist in its nature, and the political factions participating in it were competitive or even hostile to each other. The main efforts of social and political reorganization were carried out by the anarcho-syndicalists of the National Confederation of Labour and the Iberian Anarchist Federation (CNT-FAI), the revolutionary Marxist socialists of the General Union of Workers (UGT) and the Spanish Socialist Workers' Party (PSOE), and the anti-Stalinist communists of the Workers' Party of Marxist Unification (POUM). Stalinist communists of the Communist Party of Spain campaigned against the radical social reorganization and the loss of civil property rights, but also participated in the collectivization of agriculture in some areas along with the Republican Left; the revolutionaries were opposed by the moderates within the PSOE and the Republican Left along with the Communist Party, who sought to restore the authority of the Republican government; revolutionaries within the PSOE sought an authority of a transitional state.

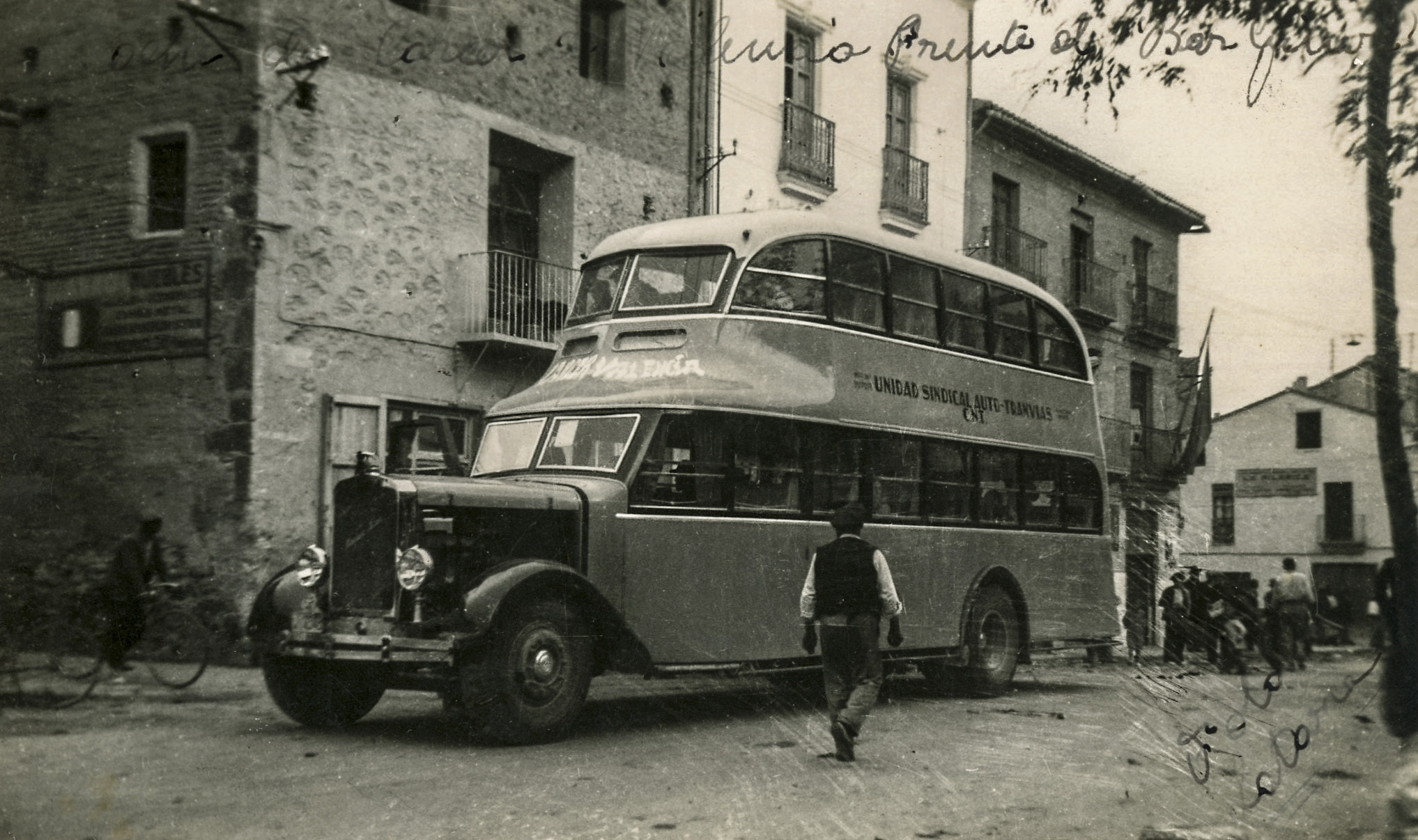
Bus service requisitioned by the CNT and the UGT, 1936

Collectivization of resources was pursued mainly by the CNT and the UGT. It took place rather in agriculture than in industry. The collectives could be organized wholly by one of the two trade unions, or by both of them as joint organizations, with other parties also participating. Along with collectivization, the revolution produced a variety of other changes, including socialization of industry, which meant workers' control over enterprises or, more broadly, over an entire branch of production; in order to achieve the latter, small production and trade plants were disestablished, and their personnel was concentrated in bigger plants, or grouped together and coordinated into cartels.

As the war progressed, the government and the communists were able to exploit their access to Soviet arms to restore government control over the war effort, through diplomacy and force. Anarchists and the POUM were integrated into the regular army, albeit with resistance. The anti-Stalinists of POUM were outlawed and denounced by the Soviet-aligned Communists as an instrument of the fascists. In the May Days of 1937, many thousands of anarchist and communist Republican soldiers fought for control of strategic points in Barcelona.

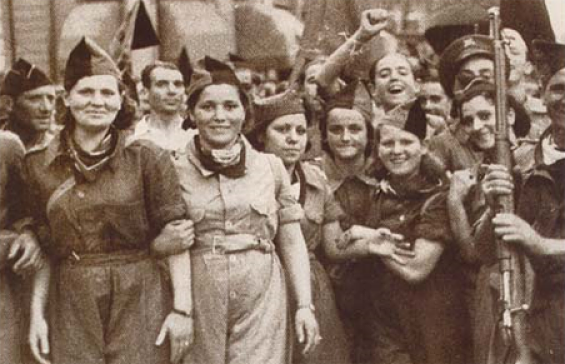
Women from the FAI during the Spanish Social Revolution.

== Combatants ==
Republican and Nationalist conscription age limits

The war was cast by Republican sympathisers as a struggle between tyranny and freedom, and by Nationalist supporters as communist and anarchist red hordes versus Christian civilisation. Nationalists also claimed they were bringing security and direction to an ungoverned and lawless country. Spanish politics, especially on the left, was quite fragmented: on the one hand socialists and communists supported the republic but on the other, during the republic, anarchists had mixed opinions, though both major groups opposed the Nationalists during the Civil War; the latter, in contrast, were united by their fervent opposition to the Republican government and presented a more unified front.

The coup divided regular forces fairly evenly. Out of some 66,000 military actually under arms in July 1936 (including the Army of Africa and the navy, excluding soldiers in service but on leave during the coup) 52% (34,000) were in the Republican zone and 48% (32,000) in the Nationalist one. Out of some 66,000 men in other armed services (Guardia Civil, Guardia de Asalto, Carabineros) 59% (39,000) joined the loyalists and 41% (27,000) joined the rebels. In total, out of some 132,000 armed and uniformed men actually in service, 55% (73,000) seemed available to the loyalists and 45% (59,000) to the rebels. However, one popular work claims that the loyalists controlled 90,000 men and the rebels controlled 130,000.

During the first few months, both armies were joined in high numbers by volunteers, Nationalists by some 100,000 men and Republicans by 120,000. From August, both sides launched their own, similarly scaled conscription schemes, resulting in further massive growth of their armies. Finally, the final months of 1936 saw the arrival of foreign troops, International Brigades joining the Republicans and Italian Corpo Truppe Volontarie (CTV), German Legion Condor and Portuguese Viriatos joining the Nationalists. The result was that in April 1937 there were some 360,000 soldiers in the Republican ranks and some 290,000 in the Nationalist ones.

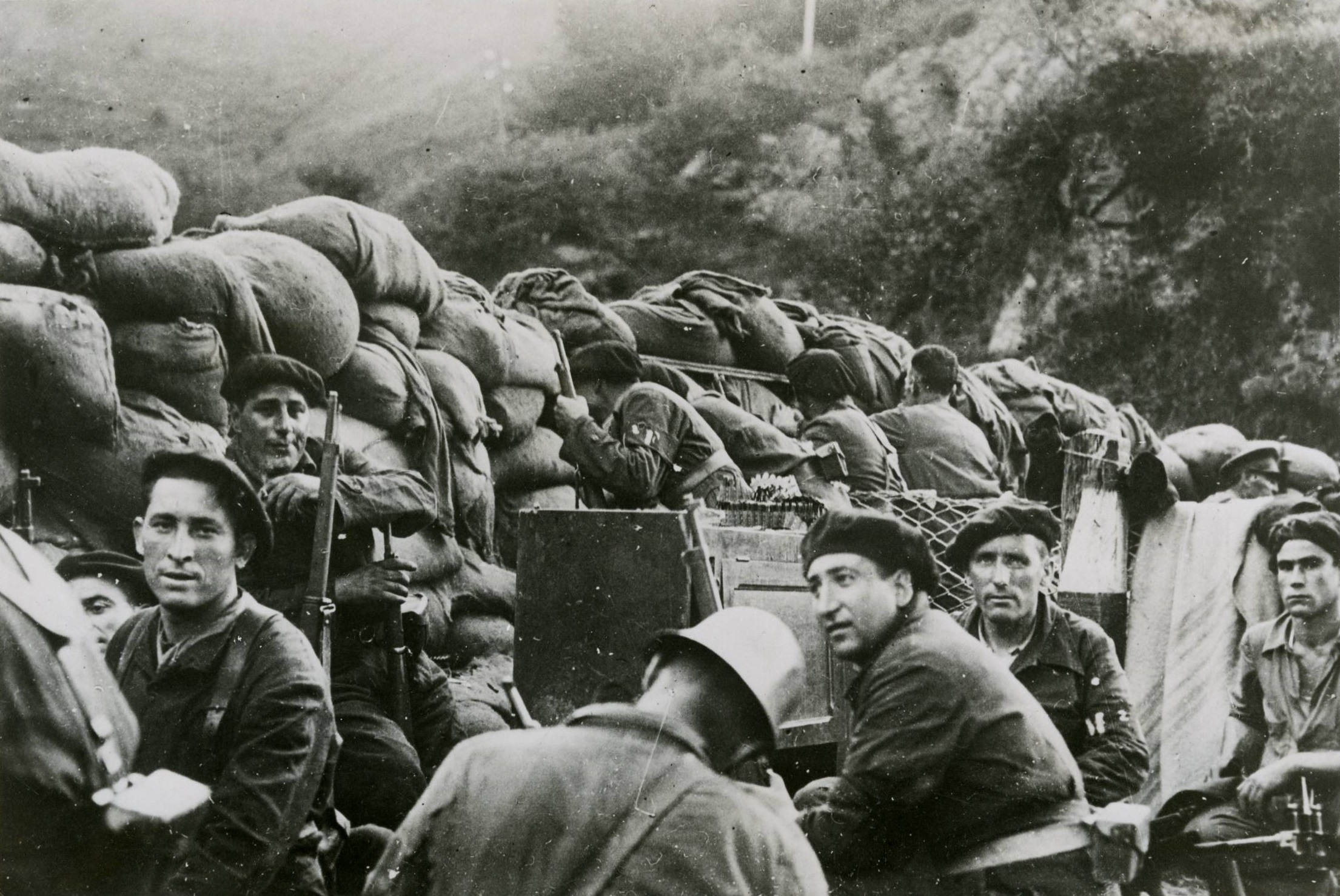
Republican forces during the battle of Irún in 1936

The armies kept growing. The principal source of manpower was conscription; both sides continued and expanded their schemes, the Nationalists drafting more aggressively, and there was little room left for volunteering. Foreigners contributed little to further growth; on the Nationalist side the Italians scaled down their engagement, while on the Republican side the influx of new interbrigadistas did not cover losses on the front. At the turn of 1937–1938, each army numbered about 700,000.

Throughout 1938, the principal if not exclusive source of new men was a draft; at this stage it was the Republicans who conscripted more aggressively, and only 47% of their combatants were in age corresponding to the Nationalist conscription age limits. Just prior to the Battle of Ebro, Republicans achieved their all-time high, slightly above 800,000; yet Nationalists numbered 880,000. The Battle of Ebro, fall of Catalonia and collapsing discipline caused a great shrinking of Republican troops. In late February 1939, their army was 400,000 compared to more than double that number of Nationalists. In the moment of their final victory, Nationalists commanded over 900,000 troops.

During the war, Nationalists also "recycled" former Republican soldiers as an additional source of manpower. As both sides employed conscription, this meant that not all soldiers were willing, committed partisans of either side and could shift their loyalties out of self-interest. Therefore, captured Republicans deemed apolitical or sufficiently sympathetic to the Nationalist cause were released from their concentration camps and then usually conscripted into the Nationalist army. By the end of 1937, out of around 107,000 Republicans taken prisoner, approximately 59,000 were classified as politically reliable enough for release and conscription into the Nationalist army. The Republicans were also known to "recycle" Nationalist defectors as well.

The total number of Spaniards serving in the Republican forces was officially stated as 917,000; later scholarly work estimated the number as "well over 1 million men", though other studies claim the Republican total of 1.75 million (including non-Spaniards) or even 1.82m, and "27 age groups, ranging from 18 to 44 years old". The total number of Spaniards serving in the Nationalist units is estimated between "nearly 1 million men", and 1.26 million (including non-Spaniards), which comprised "15 age groups, ranging from 18 to 32 years old".

=== Republicans ===
Flags of the Popular Front (left) and CNT/FAI (right). The slogan of the CNT/FAI anarchists was "Ni dios, ni estado, ni patrón" ("Neither god, nor state, nor boss"), widespread by the Spanish anarchists since 1910.

Only two countries openly and fully supported the Republic: the Mexican government and the USSR. From them, especially the USSR, the Republic received diplomatic support, volunteers, weapons and vehicles. Other countries remained neutral; this neutrality faced serious opposition from sympathizers in the United States and United Kingdom, and to a lesser extent in other European countries and from Marxists worldwide. This led to formation of the International Brigades, thousands of foreigners of all nationalities who voluntarily went to Spain to aid the Republic in the fight; they meant a great deal to morale but militarily were not very significant.

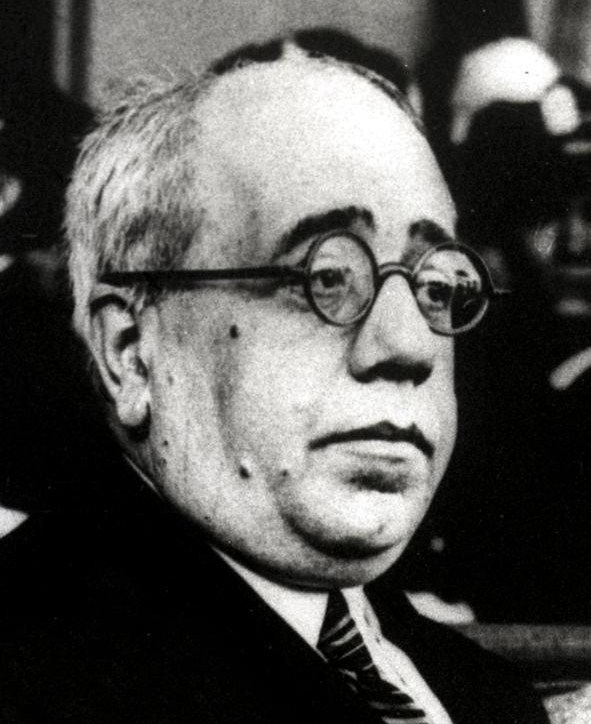
Manuel Azaña was the intellectual leader of the Second Republic and headman of the Republican side during most of the Civil War.

The Republic's supporters within Spain ranged from centrists who supported a moderately capitalist liberal democracy to revolutionary anarchists who opposed the Republic but sided with it against the coup forces. Their base was primarily secular and urban but also included landless peasants and was particularly strong in industrial regions like Asturias, the Basque country, and Catalonia.

This faction was called variously leales "Loyalists" by supporters, "Republicans", the "Popular Front", or "the government" by all parties; or los rojos "the Reds" by their opponents. Republicans were supported by urban workers, agricultural labourers, and parts of the middle class.

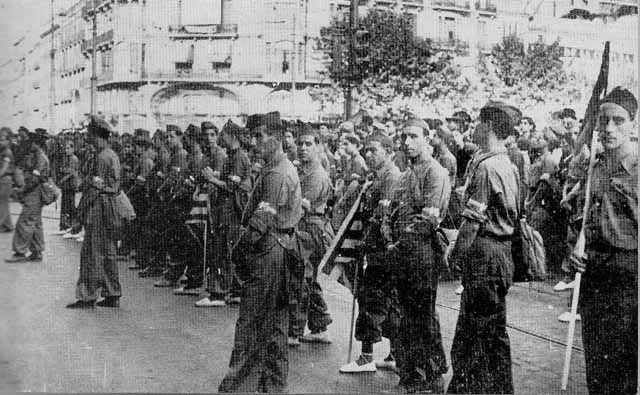
Republican volunteers at Teruel, 1936

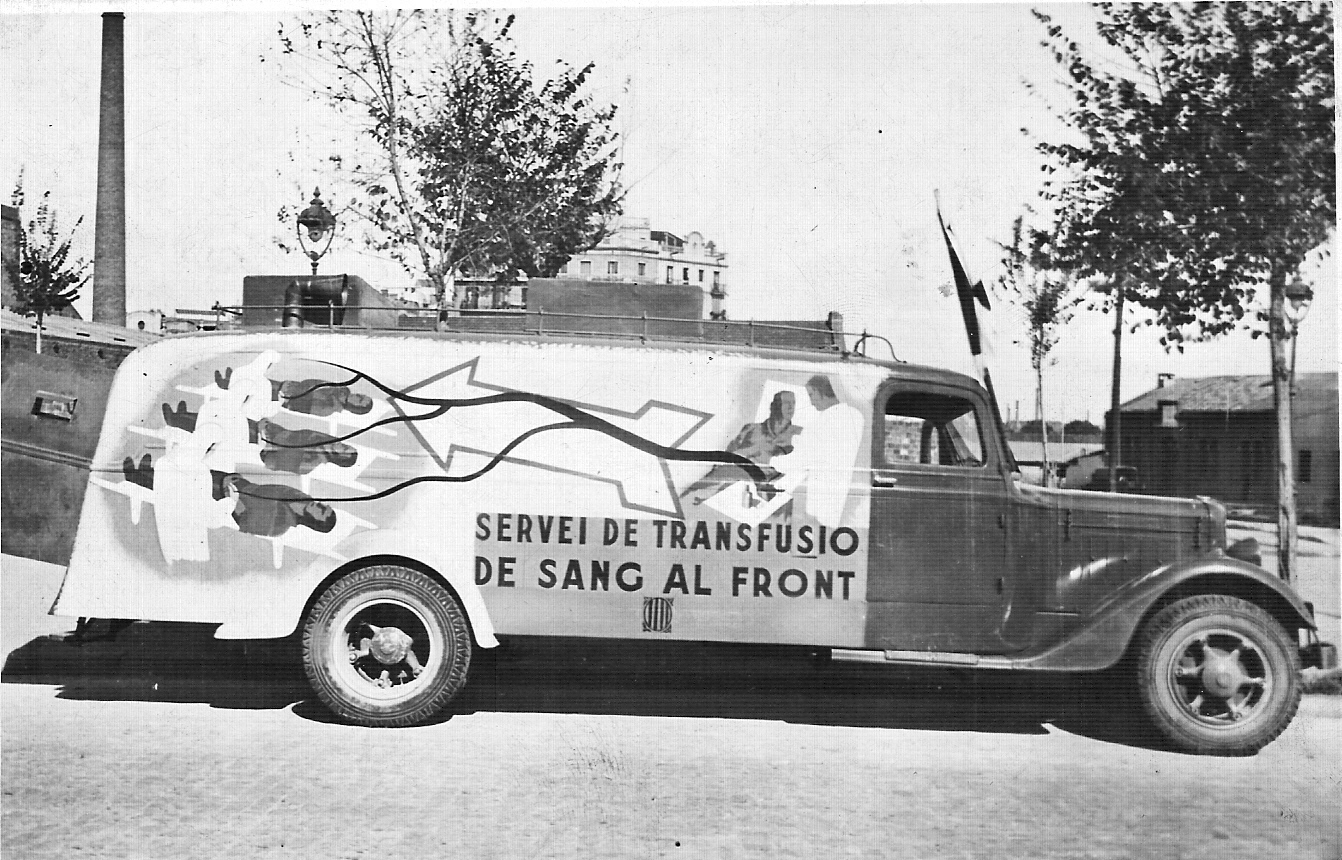
A mobile blood-transfusion service for front-line operations in Catalonia.

The conservative, strongly Catholic Basque country, along with Catholic Galicia and the more left-leaning Catalonia, sought autonomy or independence from the central government of Madrid. The Republican government allowed for the possibility of self-government for the two regions, whose forces were gathered under the People's Republican Army (Ejército Popular Republicano, or EPR), which was reorganised into mixed brigades after October 1936. Historian Stanley Payne argues that the Republicans' diverse combination of movements produced an unusual regime that lacked any exact counterpart elsewhere as it combined libertarian collectivism and regional autonomy with centralisation, state control and economic nationalisation. Payne argues that Republican Spain was not a democracy but also not a strict dictatorship, with the four different major left-wing factions remaining relatively autonomous from one another and operating within a semi-pluralist political framework and limited rule of law.

A few well-known people fought on the Republican side, such as English writer George Orwell (who wrote Homage to Catalonia (1938), an account of his experiences in the war) and Canadian thoracic surgeon Norman Bethune, who developed a mobile blood-transfusion service for front-line operations. Simone Weil briefly fought with the anarchist columns of Buenaventura Durruti.

At the beginning of the war, the Republicans outnumbered the Nationalists ten to one on the front in Aragon, but by January 1937, that advantage had dropped to four to one.

=== Nationalists ===
Flags of the Falange (left) and the Carlist Requetés (right). Both groups were merged into the FET y de las JONS, the ruling party of Francoist Spain, with the Falangists acquiring dominance over the Carlists

The Nacionales or Nationalists, also called "insurgents", "rebels" or, by opponents, Franquistas or "fascists" —feared national fragmentation and opposed the separatist movements. They were chiefly defined by their anti-communism, which galvanised diverse or opposed movements like Falangists and monarchists. Their leaders had a generally wealthier, more conservative, monarchist, landowning background.

The Nationalist side included the Carlists and Alfonsists, Spanish nationalists, the fascist Falange, and most conservatives and monarchist liberals. Virtually all Nationalist groups had strong Catholic convictions and supported the native Spanish clergy. The Nationals included the majority of the Catholic clergy and practitioners (outside of the Basque region), important elements of the army, most large landowners, and many businessmen. The Nationalist base largely consisted of the middle classes, conservative peasant smallholders in the North and Catholics in general. Catholic support became particularly pronounced as a consequence of the burning of churches and killing of priests in most leftists zones during the first six months of the war. By mid-1937, the Catholic Church gave its official blessing to the Franco regime; religious fervor was a major source of emotional support for the Nationalists during the civil war. Michael Seidmann reports that devout Catholics, such as seminary students, often volunteered to fight and would die in disproportionate numbers in the war. Catholic confession cleared the soldiers of moral doubt and increased fighting ability; Republican newspapers described Nationalist priests as ferocious in battle and Indalecio Prieto remarked that the enemy he feared most was "the requeté who has just received communion".

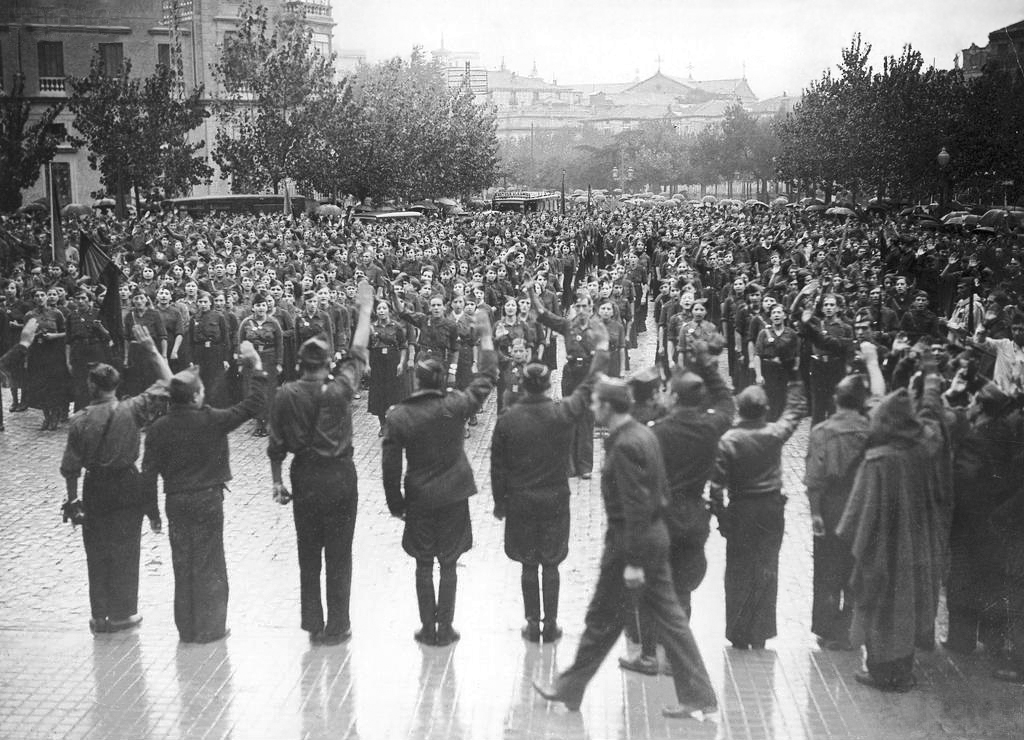
Militias of the Falange in Zaragoza, October 1936

The pre-war Falange was a small party of some 30,000–40,000 members, and it called for a National Syndicalist social revolution. Following the execution of its leader, José Antonio Primo de Rivera, by the Republicans, the party swelled in size to several hundred thousand members. The leadership of the Falange suffered 60 percent casualties in the early days of the civil war, and the party was transformed by new members and rising new leaders, called camisas nuevas ("new shirts"), who were less interested in the revolutionary aspects of National Syndicalism. In the course of the war, Franco coopted the Falange and its ideology and unified all the right-wing parties and groups which supported the coup into the Traditionalist Spanish Falange and the National Syndicalist Offensive Juntas (Spanish: Falange Española Tradicionalista de las Juntas de Ofensiva Nacional-Sindicalista, FET y de las JONS) as the ruling party of his regime and appointed himself as the party's chief. While the Carlists gained the worst positions in the new party, Franco presented himself as the direct successor to Primo de Rivera and presented 26 out of his 27 points as the party's programme, thus gaining the image of a fascist leader, while at the same time bringing the Falangists under his control with dismissals and political repression.

One of the rightists' principal motives was to confront the anti-clericalism of the Republican regime and to defend the Catholic Church, which had been targeted by opponents, including Republicans, who blamed the institution for the country's ills. The Church opposed many of the Republicans' reforms, which were fortified by the Spanish Constitution of 1931. Articles 24 and 26 of the 1931 constitution had banned the Society of Jesus. This proscription deeply offended many within the conservative fold. The revolution in the Republican zone at the outset of the war, in which 7,000 clergy and thousands of lay people were killed, deepened Catholic support for the Nationalists.

Prior to the war, during the Asturian miners' strike of 1934, religious buildings were burnt and at least 100 clergy, religious civilians, and pro-Catholic police were killed by revolutionaries. Franco had brought in Spain's colonial Army of Africa (Spanish: Ejército de África or Cuerpo de Ejército Marroquí) and reduced the miners to submission by heavy artillery attacks and bombing raids. The Spanish Legion committed atrocities and the army carried out summary executions of leftists. The repression in the aftermath was brutal and prisoners were tortured. The Moroccan Fuerzas Regulares Indígenas joined the rebellion and played a significant role in the civil war.

While the Nationalists are often assumed to have drawn in the majority of military officers, this is a somewhat simplistic analysis. The Spanish army had its own internal divisions and long-standing rifts. Officers supporting the coup tended to be africanistas (men who fought in North Africa between 1909 and 1923) while those who stayed loyal tended to be peninsulares (men who stayed back in Spain during this period). This was because during Spain's North African campaigns, the traditional promotion by seniority was suspended in favour of promotion by merit through battlefield heroism. This tended to benefit younger officers starting their careers as they could, while older officers had familial commitments that made it harder for them to be deployed in North Africa. Officers in front line combat corps (primarily infantry and cavalry) benefited over those in technical corps (those in artillery, engineering etc.) because they had more chances to demonstrate the requisite battlefield heroism and had also traditionally enjoyed promotion by seniority. The peninsulares resented seeing the africanistas rapidly leapfrog through the ranks, while the africanistas themselves were seen as swaggering and arrogant, further fueling resentment. Thus, when the coup occurred, officers who joined the rebellion, particularly from Franco's rank downwards, were often africanistas, while senior officers and those in non-front line positions tended to oppose it (though a small number of senior africanistas opposed the coup as well). It has also been argued that officers who stayed loyal to the Republic were more likely to have been promoted and to have been favoured by the Republican regime (such as those in the Aviation and Assault Guard units). Thus, while often thought of as a "rebellion of the generals", this is not correct. Of the eighteen division generals, only four rebelled (of the four division generals without postings, two rebelled and two remained loyal). Fourteen of the fifty-six brigade generals rebelled. The rebels tended to draw from less senior officers. Of the approximately 15,301 officers, just over half rebelled.

=== Other factions ===
Catalan and Basque nationalists were divided. Left-wing Catalan nationalists sided with the Republicans, while Conservative Catalan nationalists were far less vocal in supporting the government, due to anti-clericalism and confiscations occurring in areas within its control. Basque nationalists, heralded by the conservative Basque Nationalist Party, were mildly supportive of the Republican government, although some in Navarre sided with the uprising for the same reasons influencing conservative Catalans. Notwithstanding religious matters, Basque nationalists, who were for the most part Catholic, generally sided with the Republicans, although the PNV, Basque nationalist party, was reported passing the plans of Bilbao defences to the Nationalists, in an attempt to reduce the duration and casualties of siege.

== Foreign involvement ==
The Spanish Civil War exposed political divisions across Europe. The right and the Catholics supported the Nationalists to stop the spread of Bolshevism. On the left, including labour unions, students and intellectuals, the war represented a necessary battle to stop the spread of fascism. Anti-war and pacifist sentiment was strong in many countries, leading to warnings that the Civil War could escalate into a second world war. In this respect, the war was an indicator of the growing instability across Europe. The 1930s saw Spain become a focus for pacifist organisations, including the Fellowship of Reconciliation, the War Resisters League, and the War Resisters' International. Many people including, as they are now called, the insumisos ("defiant ones", conscientious objectors) argued and worked for non-violent strategies. (Note: See variously: Bennett, Scott, Radical Pacifism: The War Resisters League and Gandhian Nonviolence in America, 1915–1963, Syracuse NY, Syracuse University Press, 2003; Prasad, Devi, War Is a Crime Against Humanity: The Story of War Resisters' International, London, WRI, 2005. Also see Hunter, Allan, White Corpsucles in Europe, Chicago, Willett, Clark & Co., 1939; and Brown, H. Runham, Spain: A Challenge to Pacifism, London, The Finsbury Press, 1937.)

The Spanish Civil War involved large numbers of non-Spanish citizens who participated in combat and advisory positions. Britain and France led a political alliance of 27 nations that pledged non-intervention, including an embargo on all arms exports to Spain. The United States unofficially adopted a position of non-intervention as well, despite abstaining from joining the alliance (due in part to its policy of political isolation). The group from the United States called themselves the "Abraham Lincoln Brigade". Germany, Italy and the Soviet Union signed on officially, but ignored the embargo. The attempted suppression of imported material was largely ineffective, and France was especially accused of allowing large shipments to Republican troops. The clandestine actions of the various European powers were, at the time, considered to be risking another world war, alarming antiwar elements across the world.

The League of Nations' reaction to the war was influenced by a fear of communism, and was insufficient to contain the massive importation of arms and other war resources by the fighting factions. Although a Non-Intervention Committee was formed, its policies accomplished very little and its directives were ineffective.

=== Support for the Nationalists ===
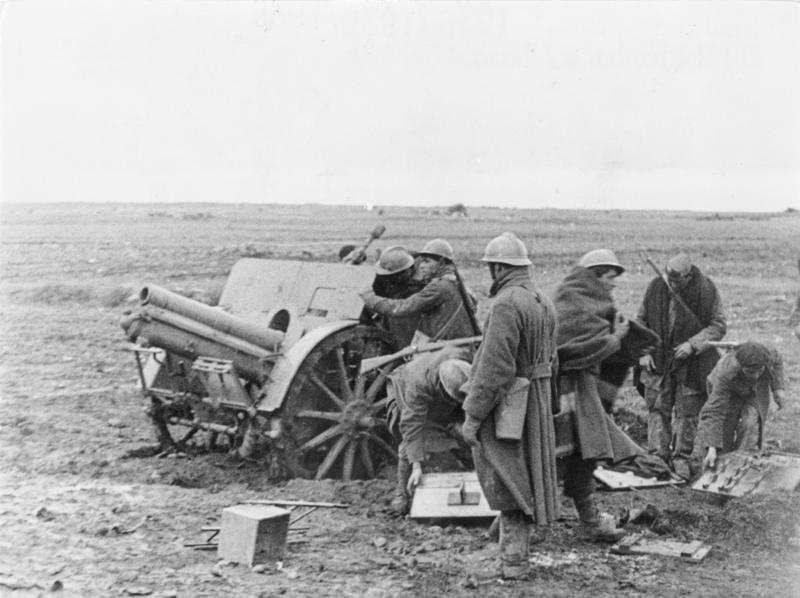
Italian troops manning a 10 cm howitzer at Guadalajara, 1937

Benito Mussolini joined the war to secure Fascist control of the Mediterranean, as the conquest of Ethiopia in the Second Italo-Ethiopian War made the Italian government confident in its military power. Italy became the stronger backer of the Nationalists. Italy supplied machine guns, artillery, aircraft, tankettes, the Aviazione Legionaria, and the Corpo Truppe Volontarie (CTV) to the Nationalist cause, and assisted with the Mediterranean blockade. The Italian CTV would supply the Nationalists with 50,000 men. Italian warships took part in breaking the Republican navy's blockade of Nationalist-held Spanish Morocco and took part in naval bombardment of Republican-held Málaga, Valencia, and Barcelona. Italian air raids targeted mainly cities and civilians. These Italian commitments were heavily propagandised in Italy and became a point of fascist pride.

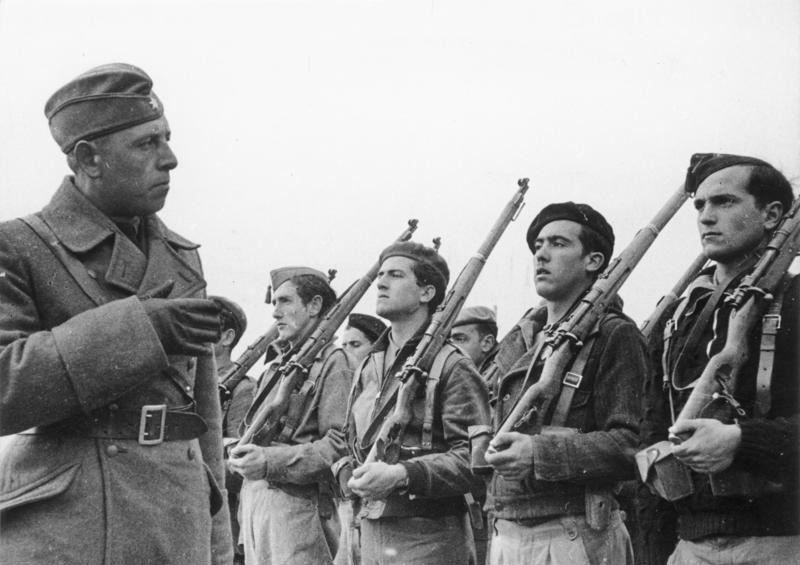
German officer from the Condor Legion instructing Nationalist infantry soldiers, Ávila

Despite the German signing of a non-intervention agreement in September 1936, Nazi Germany gave various aid and military support for the Nationalists, including the formation of the Condor Legion as a land and air force. Germany successfully flew the Army of Africa to Mainland Spain in the early stages of the war. The bombing of Guernica, on 26 April 1937, would be the most controversial event of German involvement, with perhaps 200 to 300 civilians killed. German involvement also included Operation Ursula, a U-boat undertaking and contributions from the Kriegsmarine. Strategically, Nazi support for Franco provided a distraction from Hitler's central European strategy and created a friendly Spanish state to threaten France.

Germany's Condor Legion spearheaded many Nationalist victories, particularly in the air dominance from 1937 onward. Spain was a proving ground for German tank and aircraft tactics, the latter being only moderately successful. Germany trained 56,000 Nationalist soldiers, who were technically proficient and covered infantry, tanks and anti-tank units; air and anti-aircraft forces; and those trained in naval warfare. About 16,000 German citizens fought in the conflict, mostly as pilots, ground crew, artillery and tank crew and military advisers and instructors. About 10,000 Germans were in Spain at the peak. German aid to the Nationalists amounted to approximately £43,000,000 ($215,000,000) in 1939 prices, mostly for the Condor Legion. No detailed list of German supplies furnished to Spain has been found.

Portugal supplied the Nationalists with critical ammunition and logistical resources. Throughout the war, Portugal ensured that Iberian borders would continue to supply the Nationalists. The Nationalists even referred to Lisbon as "the port of Castile". Portuguese Prime Minister António de Oliveira Salazar semi-officially endorsed the "Viriatos" volunteer force of 8,000 to 20,000. With Franco's victory increasingly certain, Portugal recognised Franco's regime and soon after the war signed a treaty of friendship and non-aggression pact, the Iberian Pact. Portugal played an important diplomatic role in supporting Franco and insisting to the British government that Franco sought to replicate Salazar's Estado Novo, not Mussolini's Fascist Italy or Hitler's Nazi Germany.

Other national groups fought alongside the Nationalists. Despite the Irish government's prohibition against participating in the war, about 600 followers of Eoin O'Duffy and Fine Gael formed the "Irish Brigade" to fight for Franco. The majority of them were anti-Communist Catholics. Around 150 to 170 White Russians fought for Franco. Romanian volunteers and legionaries of the Iron Guard allied their movement with the Nationalists.

=== Support for the Republicans ===
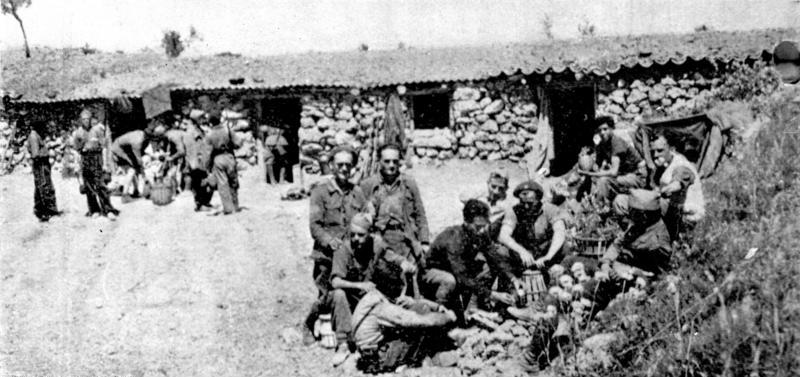
The Etkar André battalion of the International Brigades

Volunteers from many countries fought in Spain, most of them for the Republicans. About 32,000 fought in the International Brigades. Perhaps another 3,000 fought as members of the Confederación Nacional del Trabajo (CNT) and the Workers' Party of Marxist Unification (POUM) militias. Those fighting with POUM most famously included George Orwell and the small ILP Contingent. Around 2,000 Portuguese leftists fought for the Republicans and were spread throughout different units. Many of the non-Spaniards were affiliated with radical communist or socialist entities and believed that the Spanish Republic was a front line in the war against fascism. The units represented the largest foreign contingent of those fighting for the Republicans. Roughly 40,000 foreign nationals fought with the Brigades, though no more than 18,000 were in the conflict at any given time. They claimed to represent 53 nations. Significant numbers came from France (10,000), Nazi Germany and Austria (5,000), and Italy (3,350). More than 1,000 each came from the Soviet Union, the United States, the United Kingdom, Poland, Yugoslavia, Czechoslovakia, Hungary and Canada. The Thälmann Battalion, a group of Germans, and the Garibaldi Battalion, a group of Italians, distinguished their units during the siege of Madrid. Americans fought in units such as the XV International Brigade ("Abraham Lincoln Brigade"), while Canadians joined the Mackenzie–Papineau Battalion.

The International Brigades were supported by Communists worldwide, beginning with a Prague conference to raise a brigade soon after the July revolt, followed by a full-scale propaganda campaign for the Popular Front. Communist parties worldwide launched a full-scale propaganda campaign for the Popular Front. Leaders of the Communist International and the Italian Communist Party went to Spain.

Soviet Union General Secretary Joseph Stalin broke the Non-Intervention Agreement and League of Nations embargo by providing material assistance to the Republican forces, becoming their only source of major weapons. Unlike Hitler and Mussolini, Stalin tried to do this covertly. Estimates of material provided by the USSR to the Republicans vary between 634 and 806 aircraft, 331 and 362 tanks and 1,034 to 1,895 artillery pieces. Stalin also created Section X of the Soviet Union military to head the weapons shipment operation, called Operation X. Despite Stalin's interest in aiding the Republicans, the quality of arms was inconsistent. Many rifles and field guns provided were old or obsolete, but the T-26 and BT-5 tanks were modern and effective. Their supplied aircraft was current with their own forces but the German aircraft for the Nationalists proved superior by the end of the war. The movement of arms from Russia to Spain was extremely slow. Many shipments were lost or incomplete. The ships hid arms under false decks. At sea, Soviet captains used deceptive flags and paint schemes to evade Nationalist detection.

The USSR sent 2,000–3,000 military advisers to Spain; while the Soviet commitment of troops was fewer than 500 men at a time, Soviet volunteers often operated Soviet-made tanks and aircraft, particularly at the beginning of the war. The Soviets also ran the People's Commissariat for Internal Affairs (NKVD) inside the Republican rearguard. Communist figures led operations that included the murders of leftist figures.

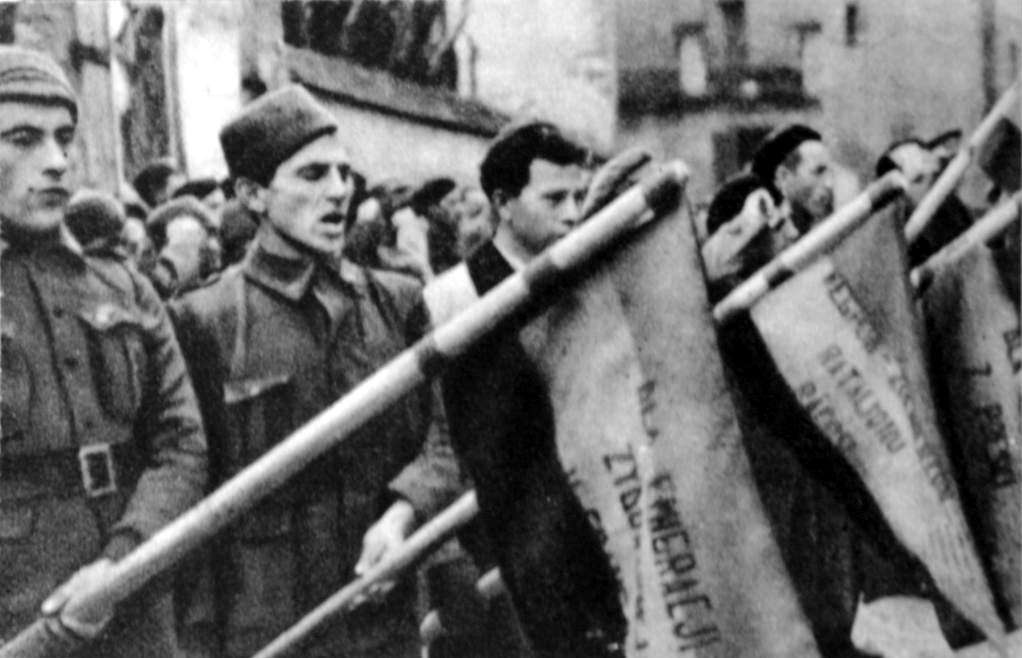
Polish volunteers in the International Brigades

After the USSR, Poland was the second largest arms supplier for the Republic and the 4th largest arms supplier when considering Italy and Germany. The Polish sold arms to Republican Spain throughout the war, motivated exclusively by economic interest, as their government favored the Nationalists. Since Poland was bound by non-intervention obligations, Polish governmental officials and the military disguised sales as commercial transactions. The weapons were obsolete, second-rate, and overpriced. Though sales amounted to $40M and up to 7% of overall Republican military spending, in some categories like machine-guns, they might have accounted for 50% of all arms delivered.

Unlike the United States and major Latin American governments, such as the ABC nations and Peru, the Mexican government supported the Republicans. Mexico abstained from following the French-British non-intervention proposals, and provided $2,000,000 in aid and material assistance, which included 20,000 rifles and 20 million cartridges. Mexico provided diplomatic help and arranged sanctuary for some 50,000 Republican refugees including Spanish intellectuals and orphaned children from Republican families.

French Prime Minister Léon Blum was sympathetic to the republic, fearing that the success of Nationalist forces in Spain would create an alliance with Nazi Germany and Fascist Italy, encircling France. After initially declaring that they would not aid the Republicans and signing the Non-Intervention Agreement, France provided the Republicans with aircraft, fighter pilots and engineers to help the Republicans. Covert support ended by December 1936 but the spectre of French intervention against the Nationalists remained a serious possibility throughout the war.

== Course of the war ==
=== 1936 ===
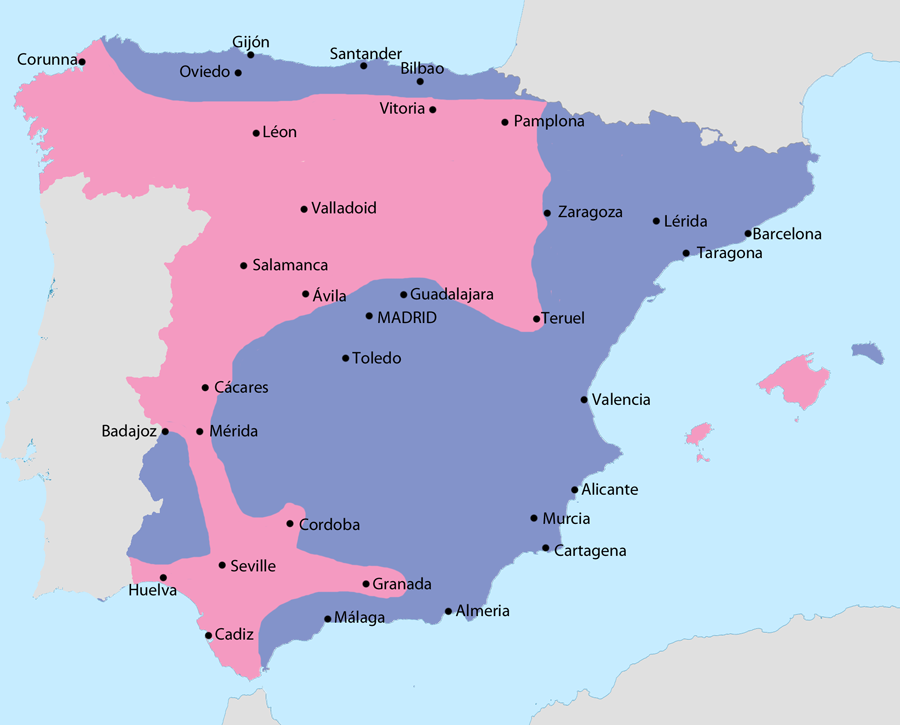
Map showing Spain in September 1936: Area under Nationalist control Area under Republican control

A large air and sealift of Nationalist troops in Spanish Morocco was organised to the southwest of Spain. Coup leader Sanjurjo was killed in a plane crash on 20 July, leaving an effective command split between Mola in the North and Franco in the South. This period also saw the worst actions of the so-called "Red" and "White Terrors" in Spain. On 21 July, the fifth day of the rebellion, the Nationalists captured the central Spanish naval base, located in Ferrol, Galicia.

A rebel force under Colonel Alfonso Beorlegui Canet, sent by General Mola and Colonel Esteban García, undertook the Campaign of Gipuzkoa from July to September. The capture of Gipuzkoa isolated the Republican provinces in the north. On 5 September, the Nationalists closed the French border to the Republicans in the battle of Irún. On 15 September San Sebastián, home to a divided Republican force of anarchists and Basque nationalists, was taken by Nationalist soldiers.

The Republic proved ineffective militarily, relying on disorganised revolutionary militias. The Republican government under Giral resigned on 4 September, unable to cope with the situation, and was replaced by a mostly Socialist organisation under Francisco Largo Caballero. The new leadership began to unify central command in the republican zone. The civilian militias were often simply just civilians armed with whatever was available. Thus, they fared poorly in combat, particularly against the professional Army of Africa armed with modern weapons, ultimately contributing to Franco's rapid advance.

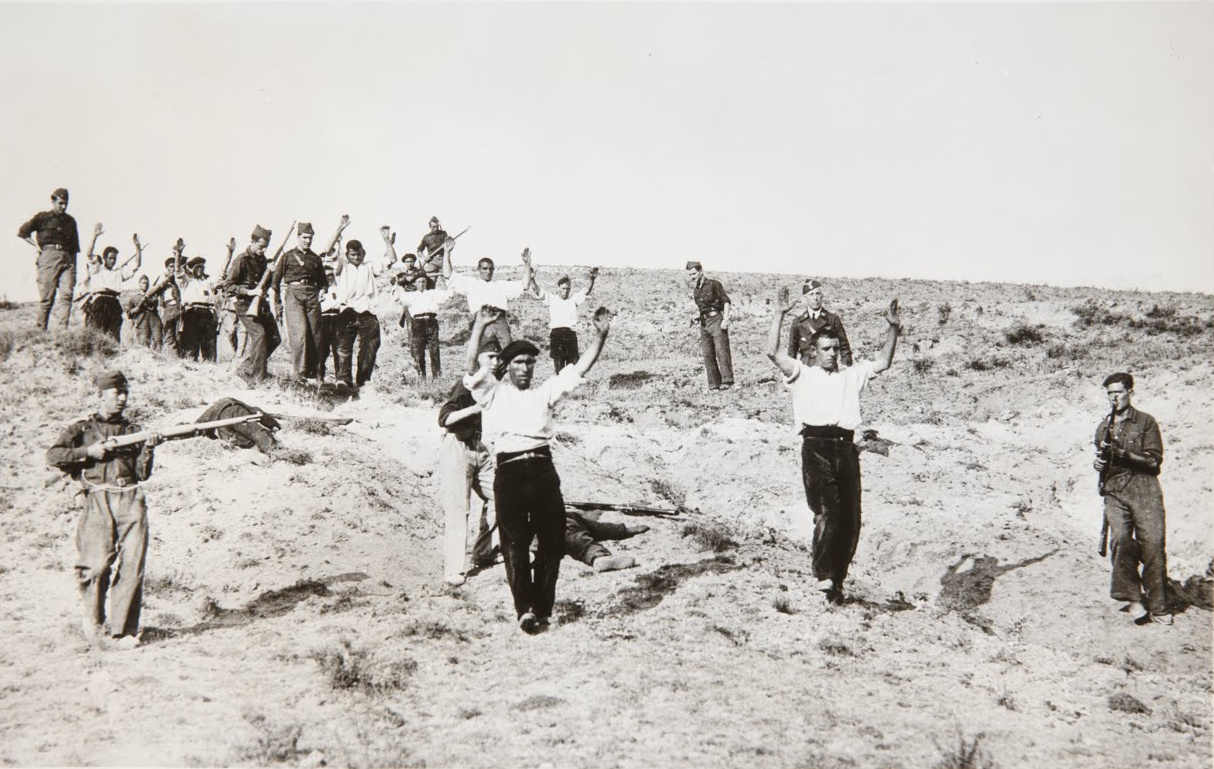
Surrender of Republican soldiers in the Somosierra area, 1936

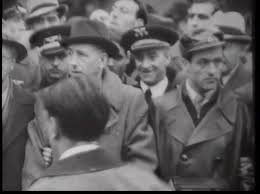
Leonese anarchist Buenaventura Durruti was fatally shot after he arrived in Madrid to reinforce the morale of the Republicans during an unsuccessful Francoist siege in Madrid. His funeral, headed (in the image) by Lluís Companys, president of the Generalitat of Catalonia, and Joan García i Oliver, Minister of Justice of the Spanish Republic, was in Barcelona.

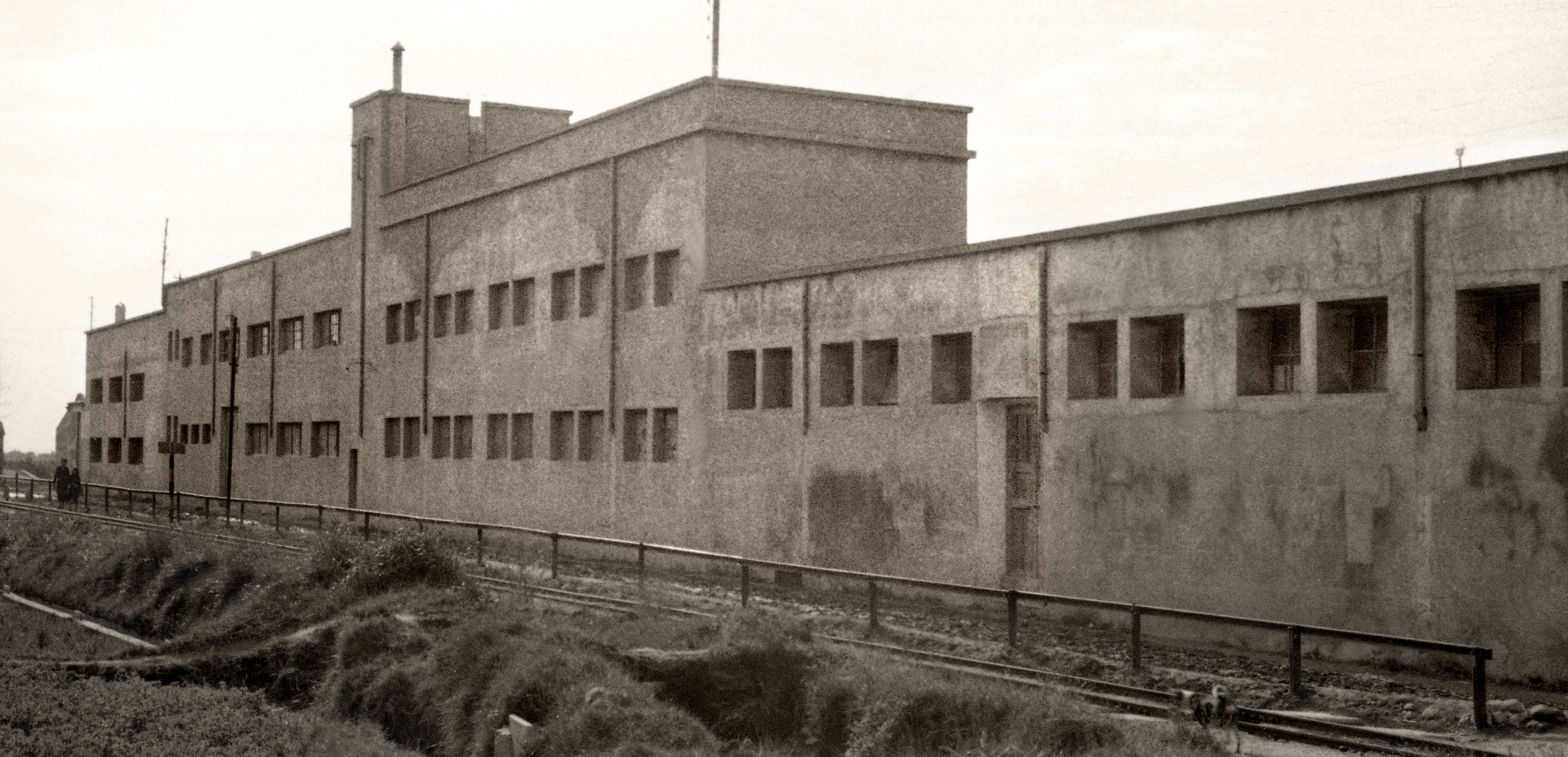
Alginet weapons factory

On the Nationalist side, Franco was chosen as chief military commander at a meeting of ranking generals at Salamanca on 21 September, now called by the title Generalísimo. Franco won another victory on 27 September when his troops relieved the siege of the Alcázar in Toledo, which had been held by a Nationalist garrison under Colonel José Moscardó Ituarte since the beginning of the rebellion, resisting thousands of Republican troops, who completely surrounded the isolated building. Moroccans and elements of the Spanish Legion came to the rescue. Two days after relieving the siege, Franco proclaimed himself Caudillo ("chieftain", the Spanish equivalent of the Italian Duce and the German Führer—meaning: 'director') while forcibly unifying the various and diverse Falangist, Royalist and other elements within the Nationalist cause. The diversion to Toledo gave Madrid time to prepare a defense but was hailed as a major propaganda victory and personal success for Franco. On 1 October 1936, General Franco was confirmed head of state and armies in Burgos. A similar dramatic success for the Nationalists occurred on 17 October, when troops coming from Galicia relieved the besieged town of Oviedo, in Northern Spain.

In October, the Francoist troops launched a major offensive toward Madrid, reaching it in early November and launching a major assault on the city on 8 November. The Republican government was forced to shift from Madrid to Valencia, outside the combat zone, on 6 November. However, the Nationalists' attack on the capital was repulsed in fierce fighting between 8 and 23 November. A contributory factor in the successful Republican defense was the effectiveness of the Fifth Regiment and later the arrival of the International Brigades, though only an approximate 3,000 foreign volunteers participated in the battle. On 19 November, Buenaventura Durruti, a major Spanish anarchist, was fatally shot with unclear causes.

Having failed to take the capital, Franco bombarded it from the air and, in the following two years, mounted several offensives to try to encircle Madrid, beginning the three-year siege of Madrid. The Second Battle of the Corunna Road, a Nationalist offensive to the northwest, pushed Republican forces back, but failed to isolate Madrid. The battle lasted into January.

=== 1937 ===
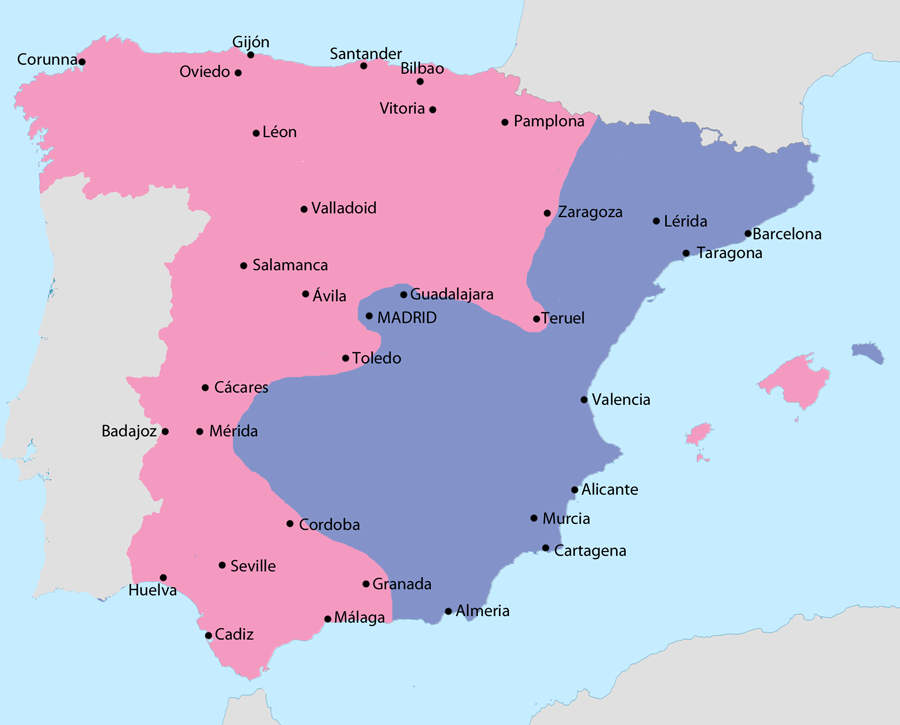
Map showing Spain in October 1937: Area under Nationalist control Area under Republican control

With his ranks swelled by Italian troops and Spanish colonial soldiers from Morocco, Franco made another attempt to capture Madrid in January and February 1937, but was again unsuccessful. The Battle of Málaga started in mid-January, and this Nationalist offensive in Spain's southeast would turn into a disaster for the Republicans, who were poorly organised and armed. The city was taken by Franco on 8 February. The consolidation of various militias into the Republican Army had started in December 1936. The main Nationalist advance to cross the Jarama and cut the supply to Madrid by the Valencia road, termed the Battle of Jarama, led to heavy casualties (6,000–20,000) on both sides. The operation's main objective was not met, though Nationalists gained a modest amount of territory.

A similar Nationalist offensive, the Battle of Guadalajara, was a more significant defeat for Franco and his armies. This was the only publicised Republican victory of the war. Franco used Italian troops and blitzkrieg tactics; while many strategists blamed Franco for the rightists' defeat, the Germans believed it was the former at fault for the Nationalists' 5,000 casualties and loss of valuable equipment. The German strategists successfully argued that the Nationalists needed to concentrate on vulnerable areas first.

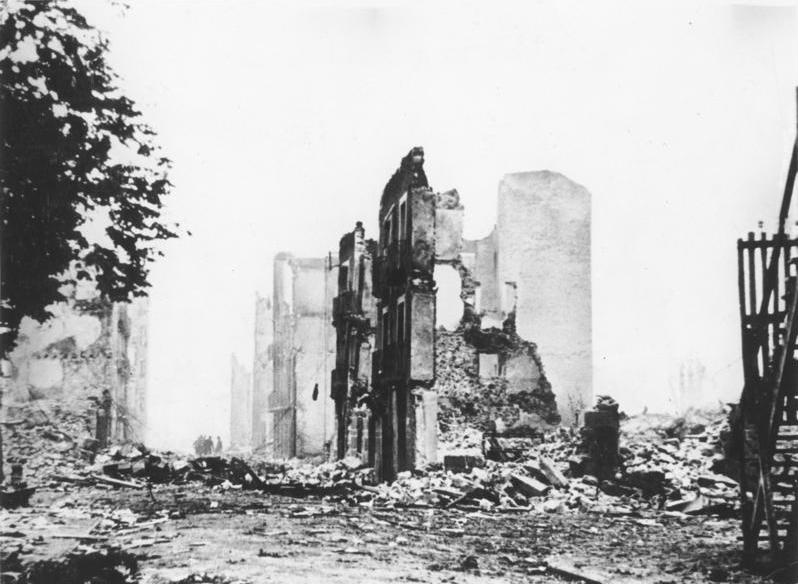
Ruins of Guernica

The "War in the North" began in mid-March, with the Biscay Campaign. The Basques suffered most from the lack of a suitable air force. On 26 April, the Condor Legion bombed the town of Guernica, killing 200–300 and causing significant damage. The bombing of Guernica had a significant effect on international opinion. The Basques retreated from the area.

April and May saw the May Days, infighting among Republican groups in Catalonia. The dispute was between an ultimately victorious government—Communist forces and the anarchist CNT. The disturbance pleased Nationalist command, but little was done to exploit Republican divisions. After the fall of Guernica, the Republican government began to fight back with increasing effectiveness. In July, it made a move to recapture Segovia, forcing Franco to delay his advance on the Bilbao front, but for only two weeks. The Huesca Offensive failed similarly.

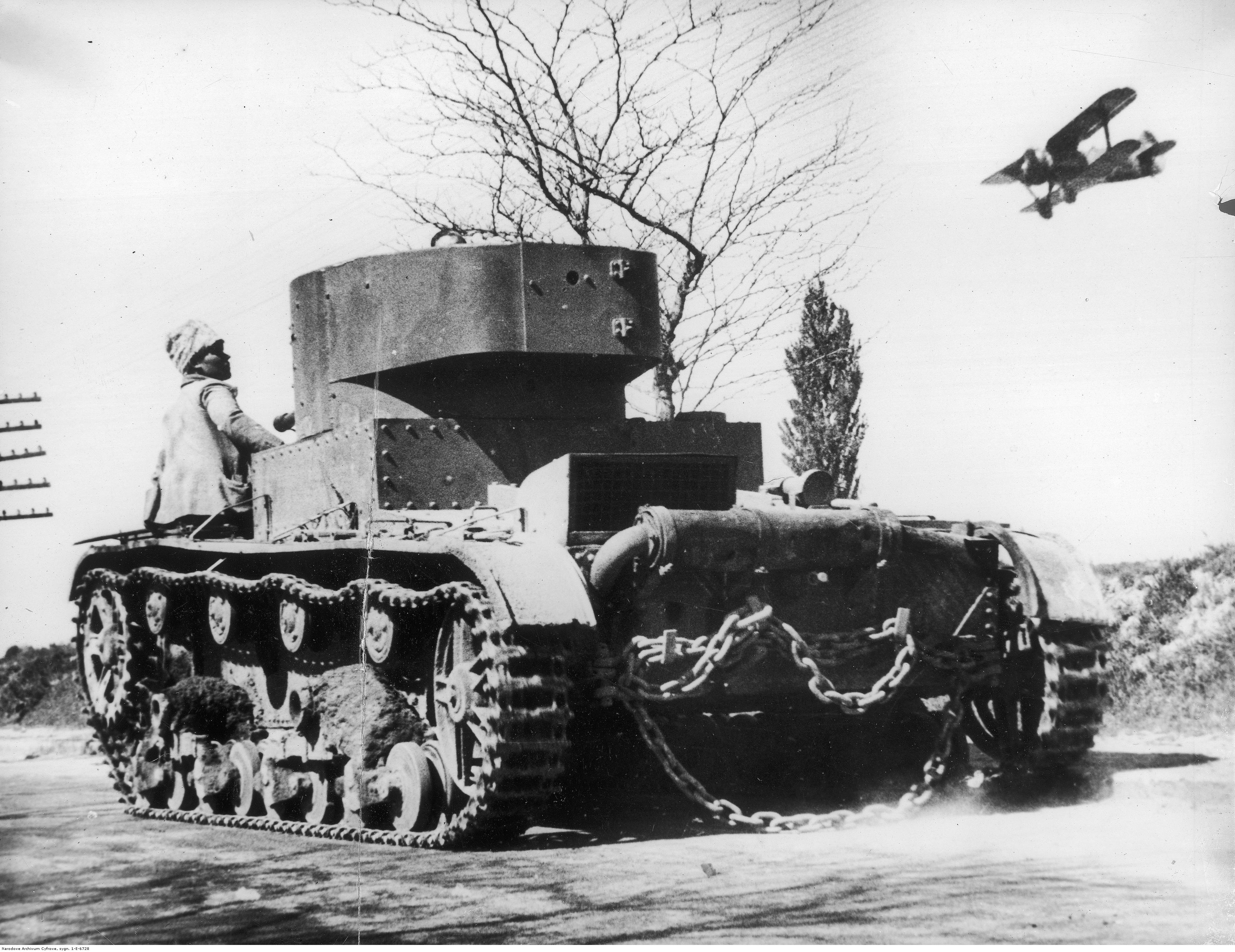
Republican T-26 tank on the Aragon front, November 1937.

Mola, Franco's second-in-command, was killed on 3 June, in an airplane accident. In early July, despite the earlier loss at the Battle of Bilbao, the government launched a strong counter-offensive to the west of Madrid, focusing on Brunete. The Battle of Brunete, however, was a significant defeat for the Republic, which lost many of its most accomplished troops. The offensive led to an advance of 50 square kilometres (19 mi^{2}), and left 25,000 Republican casualties.

A Republican offensive against Zaragoza was also a failure. Despite having land and aerial advantages, the Battle of Belchite, a place lacking any military interest, resulted in an advance of only 10 kilometres (6.2 mi) and the loss of much equipment. Franco invaded Aragón and took the city of Santander in Cantabria in August. With the surrender of the Republican army in the Basque territory came the Santoña Agreement. Gijón finally fell in late October in the Asturias Offensive. Franco had effectively won in the north. At November's end, with Franco's troops closing in on Valencia, the government had to move again, this time to Barcelona.

=== 1938 ===
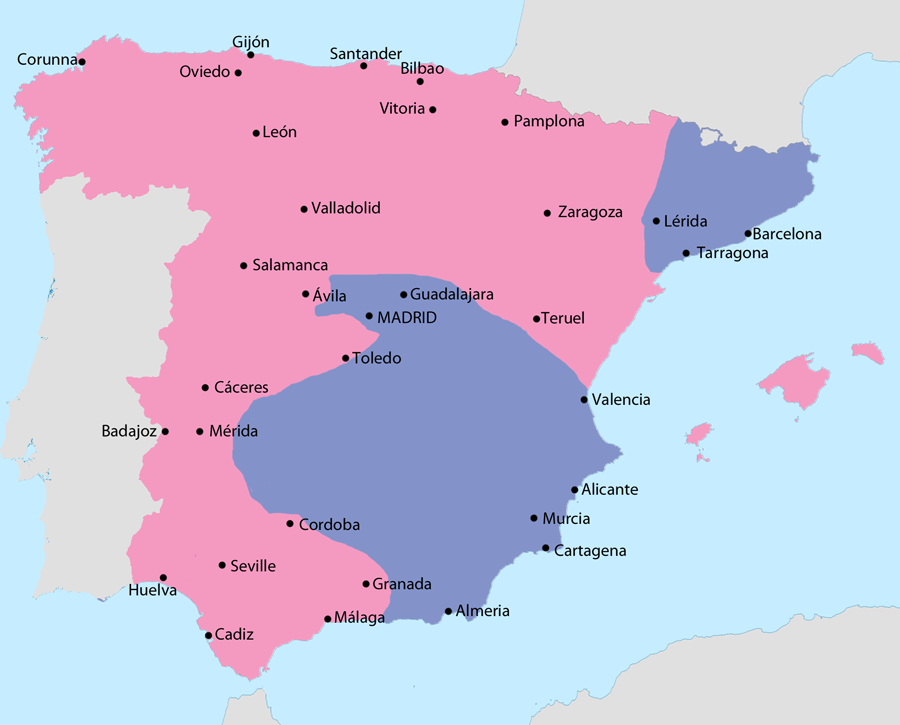
Map showing Spain in July 1938: Area under Nationalist control Area under Republican control

The Battle of Teruel was an important confrontation in 1938, its outcome heralding future progress of the war. The city, which had formerly belonged to the Nationalists, was conquered by Republicans in January. Francoist troops launched a counter-offensive and recovered the city by 22 February, the Nationalists relying heavily on German and Italian air support.

Teruel secured, on 7 March the Nationalists launched the Aragon Offensive; by 14 April they had pushed east through to the Mediterranean, cutting the Republican-held portion of Spain in two. The Republican government attempted to sue for peace in May, but Franco demanded unconditional surrender, and the war raged on.

In July, the Nationalist army pressed southward from Teruel, pushing south along the coast toward the capital of the Republic at Valencia, but was halted in heavy fighting along the XYZ Line, a system of fortifications defending Valencia. The Republican government then launched an all-out campaign to reconnect their territory in the Battle of the Ebro, from 24 July until 26 November; the scale of the Republican offensive forced Franco to personally take command.

The Republican Ebro campaign was unsuccessful, undermined by the agreement signed in Munich, Germany, between Hitler and Chamberlain. The Munich Agreement effectively caused a collapse in Republican morale by ending hope of an anti-fascist alliance with Western powers. The subsequent Republican retreat from the Ebro all but determined the outcome of the war. Eight days before the new year, Franco threw massive forces into an invasion of Catalonia.

=== 1939 ===
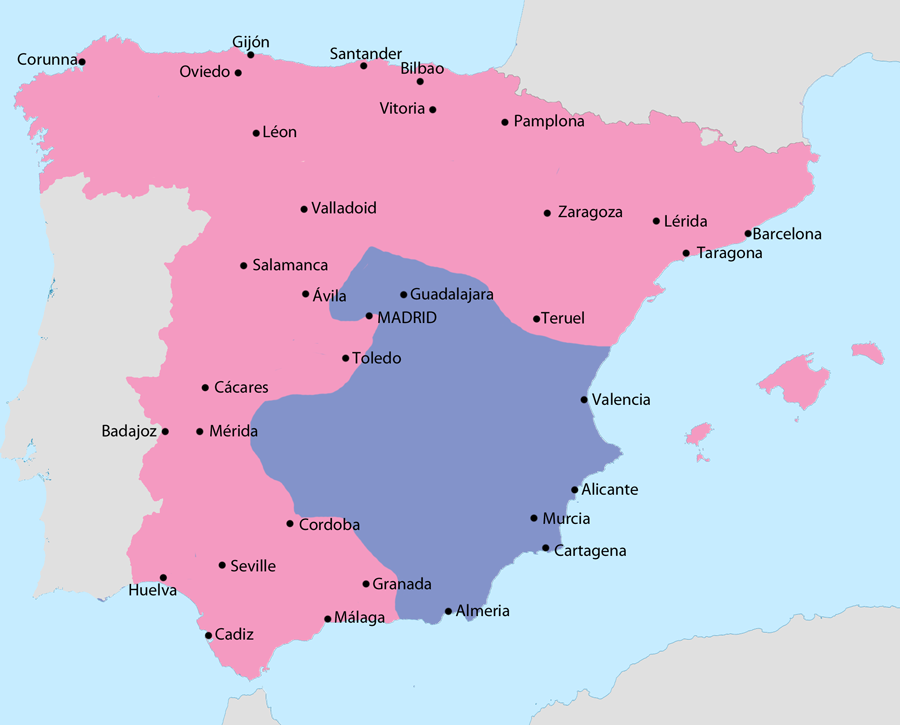
Map showing Spain in February 1939: Area under Nationalist control Area under Republican control

Franco's troops conquered Catalonia in a whirlwind campaign during the first two months of 1939. Tarragona fell on 15 January, followed by Barcelona on 26 January and Girona on 2 February. On 27 February, the United Kingdom and France recognized the Franco regime.

Only Madrid and a few other strongholds remained for the Republican forces. On 5 March 1939 the Republican army, led by the Colonel Segismundo Casado and the politician Julián Besteiro, rose against the prime minister Juan Negrín and formed the National Defence Council (Consejo Nacional de Defensa or CND) to negotiate a peace deal. Negrín fled to France on 6 March, but the Communist troops around Madrid rose against the junta, starting a brief civil war within the civil war. Casado defeated them, and began peace negotiations with the Nationalists, but Franco refused to accept anything less than unconditional surrender.

On 26 March, the Nationalists started a general offensive, on 28 March the Nationalists occupied Madrid and, by 31 March, they controlled all Spanish territory. Franco proclaimed victory in a radio speech aired on 1 April, when the last of the Republican forces surrendered.

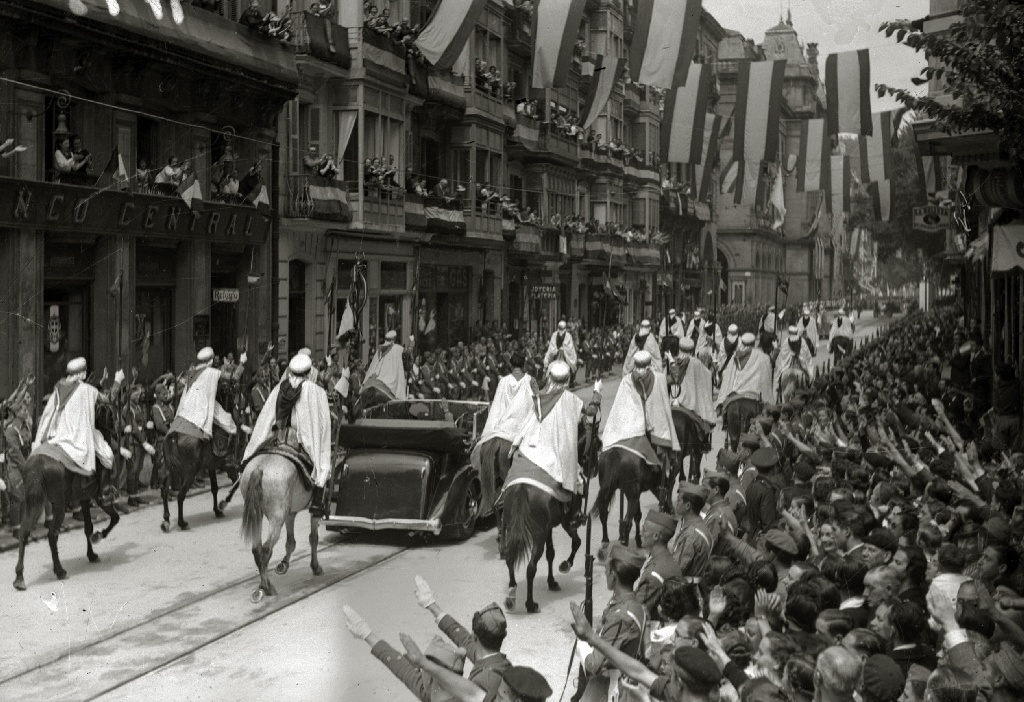
Franco arriving in San Sebastián in 1939

After the end of the war, there were harsh reprisals against Franco's former enemies. Thousands of Republicans were imprisoned and at least 30,000 executed. Other estimates of these deaths range from 50,000 to 200,000, depending on which deaths are included. Many others were put to forced labour, building railways, draining swamps, and digging canals.

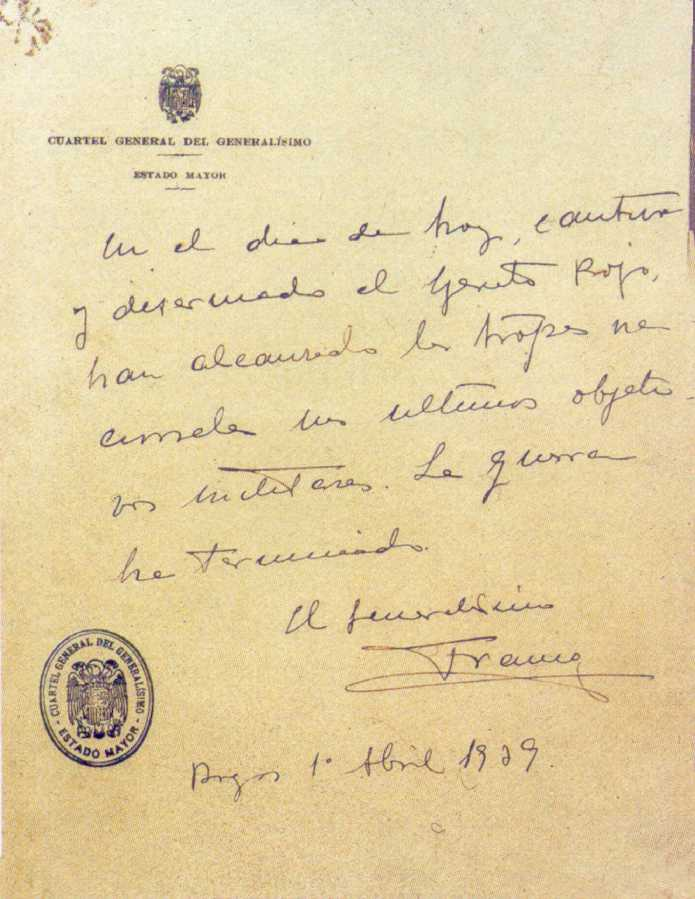
Franco declares the end of the war, though small pockets of Republicans fought on.

At the end of the war, in what was called La Retirada (withdrawal) hundreds of thousands of Republicans fled abroad, with some 500,000 fleeing to France. Refugees were confined in internment camps of the French Third Republic, such as Camp Gurs or Camp Vernet, where 12,000 Republicans were housed in squalid conditions. In his capacity as consul in Paris, Chilean poet and politician Pablo Neruda organised the immigration to Chile of 2,200 Republican exiles.

Of the 17,000 refugees housed in Gurs, farmers and others who could not find relations in France were encouraged by the Third Republic, in agreement with the Francoist government, to return to Spain. The great majority did so and were turned over to the Francoist authorities in Irún. From there, they were transferred to the Miranda de Ebro camp for "purification" according to the Law of Political Responsibilities. After the proclamation by Marshal Philippe Pétain of the Vichy regime, the refugees became political prisoners, and the French police attempted to round up those who had been liberated from the camp. Along with other "undesirable" people, the Spaniards were sent to the Drancy internment camp before being deported to Nazi Germany. 4,427 Spaniards died in the Mauthausen concentration camp.

After the official end of the war, guerrilla warfare was waged on an irregular basis by the Spanish Maquis well into the 1950s, gradually reduced by military defeats and scant support from the exhausted population. In 1944, a group of republican veterans, who also fought in the French resistance against the Nazis, invaded the Val d'Aran in northwest Catalonia, but were defeated after 10 days. According to some scholars, the Spanish Civil War lasted until 1952; until 1939 it was "conventional civil war", but afterwards it turned into an "irregular civil war".

== Evacuation of children ==
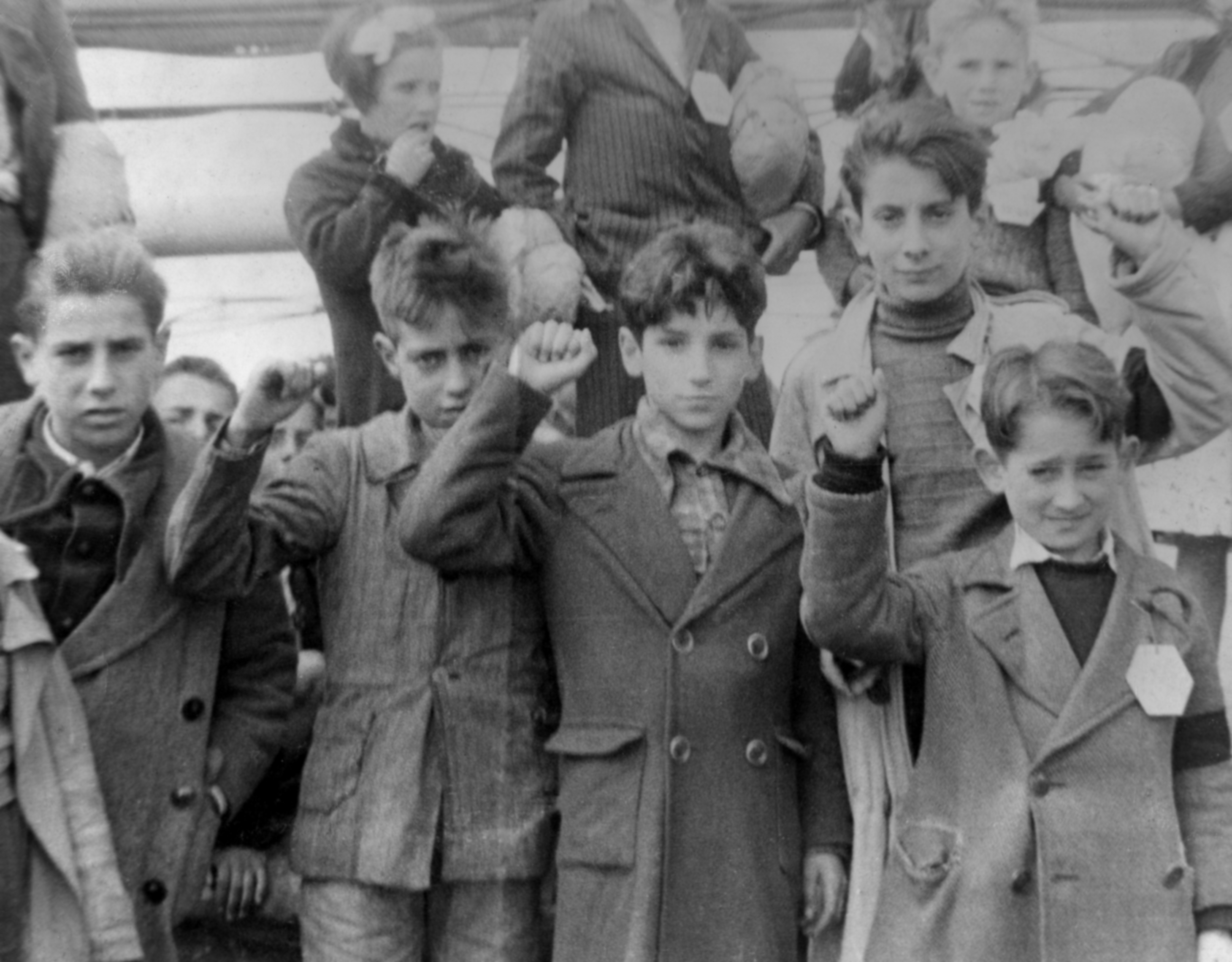
Children preparing for evacuation, some giving the Republican salute. The Republicans showed a raised fist whereas the Nationalists gave the Roman salute. (Note: "The Roman salute characteristic of Italian fascism was first adopted by the PNE and the JONS, later spreading to the Falange and other extreme right groups, before it became the official salute in Franco's Spain. The JAP salute, which consisted of stretching the right arm horizontally to touch the left shoulder enjoyed only relatively little acceptance. The gesture of the raised fist, so widespread among left-wing workers' groups, gave rise to more regimented variations, such as the salute with the fist on one's temple, characteristic of the German Rotfront, which was adopted by the republican Popular Army". The Splintering of Spain, pp. 36–37)

The Republicans oversaw the evacuation of 30,000–35,000 children from their zone, starting with Basque areas, from which 20,000 were evacuated. Their destinations included the United Kingdom and the USSR, and many other countries in Europe, along with Mexico. The policy of evacuating children to foreign countries was initially opposed to by elements in the government as well as private charities, who saw the policy as unnecessary and harmful to the well-being of the evacuated children. On 21 May 1937, around 4,000 Basque children were evacuated to the UK on the aging steamship SS Habana from the Spanish port of Santurtzi. Upon their arrival two days later in Southampton, the children were sent to families all over England, with over 200 children accommodated in Wales. The upper age limit was initially set at 12 but raised to 15. By mid-September, all of los niños vascos, as they became known, had found homes with families. Most were repatriated to Spain after the war, but some 250 were still in Britain by the end of the Second World War in 1945 and some chose to settle there.

== Financing ==
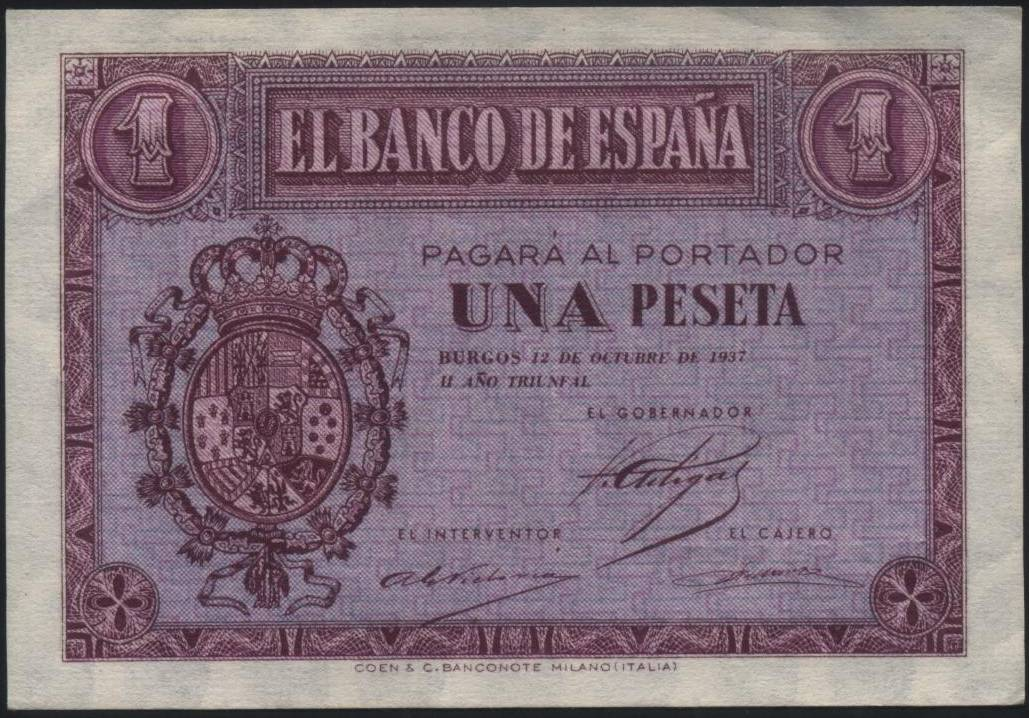
One-peseta Nationalist note, 1937

During the Civil War the Nationalist and Republican military expenditures combined totalled some $3.89bn, on average $1.44bn annually. (Note: the war lasted 986 days; dollars are quoted at their nominal value of the late 1930s) The overall Nationalist expenditures are calculated at $2.04bn, while the Republican ones reached ca. $1,85bn. In comparison, in 1936–1938 the French military expenditure totalled $0.87bn, the Italian ones reached $2.64bn, and the British ones stood at $4.13bn. As in the mid-1930s the Spanish GDP was much smaller than the Italian, French or British ones, and as in the Second Republic the annual defence and security budget was usually around $0,13bn (total annual governmental spendings were close to $0.65bn), (Note: in 1934 the Spanish military spendings as reported by the statistical office were 958m ptas; in 1935 they were 1.065m ptas, Huerta Barajas Justo Alberto (2016), Gobierno u administración militar en la II República Española, ISBN 978-8434023031, p. 805. The peseta to dolar exchange rate for 1935 varied from 7.32 in August to 7.38 in January, Martínez Méndez P. (1990), Nuevos datos sobre la evolución de la peseta entre 1900 y 1936, ISBN 8477930724, p. 14) wartime military expenditures put huge strain on the Spanish economy. Financing the war posed enormous challenge for both the Nationalists and the Republicans.

The two combatant parties followed similar financial strategies; in both cases money creation, rather than new taxes or issue of debt, was key to financing the war.

Both sides relied mostly on domestic resources; in the case of the Nationalists, they amounted to 63% of the overall spendings ($1.28bn) and in the case of the Republicans they stood at 59% ($1.09bn). In the Nationalist zone money creation was responsible for some 69% of domestic resources, while in the Republican one the corresponding figure stood at 60%; it was accomplished mostly by means of advances, credits, loans and debit balances from respective central banks. However, while in the Nationalist zone the rising stock of money was only marginally above the production growth rate, in the Republican zone it by far exceeded dwindling production figures. The result was that while by the end of the war the Nationalist inflation was 41% compared to 1936, the Republican one was in triple digits. The second component of domestic resource was fiscal revenue. In the Nationalist zone it grew steadily and in the 2nd half of 1938 it was 214% of the figure from the 2nd half of 1936. In the Republican zone fiscal revenues in 1937 dropped to some 25% of revenues recorded in the proportional area in 1935 but recovered slightly in 1938. Neither side re-engineered the pre-war tax system; differences resulted from dramatic problems with tax collection in the Republican zone and from the course of the war, as more and more of the population were governed by the Nationalists. A smaller percentage of domestic resources came from expropriations, donations or internal borrowing.

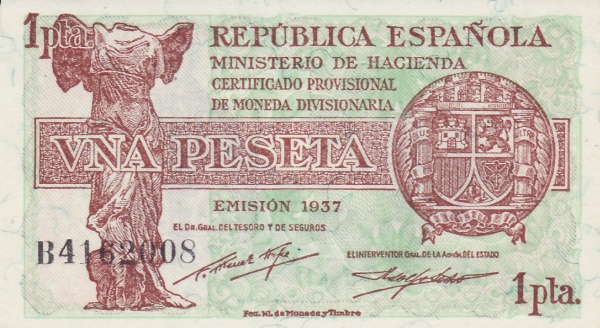
One-peseta Republican note, 1937

Foreign resources amounted to 37% in case of the Nationalists ($0,76bn) and 41% in case of the Republicans ($0,77bn). (Note: when assessing financial cost of waging the war, some scholars limit their analysis to foreign resources only and set expenditures of both sides at some $0,7bn each, compare e.g. Romero Salvado, Francisco J. (2013), Historical Dictionary of the Spanish Civil War, ISBN 978-0810857841, p. 20. Similarly, another author claims that "the republican authorities obtained 714 million dollars, and this was the financial cost of the civil war for the Republicans", while "the financial cost of the war on the Francoist side was very similar, between 694 and 716 million dollars". The same author claims in the same work that "losing the war cost the Republic almost as much as Franco spent on winning it, some six hundred million dollars on each side" (p. 185)) For the Nationalists it was mostly the Italian and German credit; (Note: exact figures differ; one source claims $0,45bn for Italy and $0,23bn for Germany, Romero Salvado 2013, p. 20; the rest was mostly private credit from British (e.g. Rio Tinto) or US (e.g. Texaco) companies) in case of the Republicans, it was sales of gold reserves, mostly to the USSR and in much smaller amount to France. None of the sides resolved to public borrowing and none floated debt on foreign exchange markets.

Authors of recent studies suggest that given Nationalist and Republican spendings were comparable, earlier theory pointing to Republican mismanagement of resources is no longer tenable. (Note: earlier studies suggested that the Republican military expenditures were 4 times larger than the Nationalist ones (40bn ptas v. 12bn ptas); the conclusion drawn was that the Republicans have grossly mismanaged their resources. Recent studies claim that the above figures are calculated in nominal terms, and that entirely different picture emerges when inflation and exchange rates are taken into account,) Instead, they claim that the Republicans failed to translate their resources into military victory largely because of constraints of the international non-intervention agreement; they were forced to spend in excess of market prices and accept goods of lower quality. Initial turmoil in the Republican zone contributed to problems, while at later stages the course of the war meant that population, territory and resources kept shrinking.

== Friction between Republican leadership and Catalonia ==
Given the lack of operativeness of the republican army after the Spanish coup of July 1936, the columns of militiamen temporarily played their role. There was also an expedition supported by the Generalitat de Catalunya to recover Mallorca. The lack of support from the Spanish government for the underlying cause of the Generalitat being involved into the operation and the Catalanist propaganda that promoted the enlistment of volunteers forced the withdrawal. Not recapturing Mallorca would be of great importance in the future course of the war.

The Republic, prevented from buying weapons abroad by the international agreement of neutrality, which both Germany and Italy ignored, urgently required war material. In this context, the Generalitat built a network of war industries converting civilian industries. When the republican government moved to Barcelona in 1937, it took control of the war industries from the Generalitat. But under their control, production dropped dramatically, with the consequent impact on supplies to the war fronts.

While this was happening, Prime Minister Negrín treated President Companys with notable disloyalty, to the final point of abandoning him at the French border, after appropriating the Generalitat's reserve funds for exile.

All of above can be illustrated with Negrín's statement collected by Julián Zugazagoitia:

I am not waging war against Franco so that a stupid and sleazy separatism will return to us in Barcelona. I am waging war for Spain and for Spain! For greatness and for greatness! Those who assume otherwise are mistaken. There is only one nation: Spain! Before consenting to nationalist campaigns that lead us to dismemberment that I in no way admit, I would give way to Franco without any other condition than to get aside the Germans and Italians.

== Death toll ==
Civil War death toll
Range	Estimate
+2m	2,000,000 (Note: highest considered estimate; "la guerra civil fue una espantosa calamidad en la que todas las clases y todos los partidos perdieron. Además del millión o dos milliones de muertos, la salud del pueblo se ha visto minada por su secuela de hambre y enfermedades", Brennan, Gerald (1978), El laberinto español. Antecedentes sociales y políticos de la guerra civil, ISBN 978-8485361038, p. 20)
+1m	1,500,000, (Note: some press estimates from the era, see e.g. "one and a half million Spaniards have already been killed in the war", Spain's War Goes On, [in:] Daily Record [Britain] 28 March 1939) 1,218,000, (Note: "muertes por causa directa de la Guerra Civil Española"; includes post-war guerilla, Nazi concentration camps, post-war repression, and "sobremortalidad hasta 1943", Jorge L. Tizón, La guerra como campo de batalla, Barcelona 2022, ISBN 9788425449635, p. 44) 1,200,000, (Note: "esta cruenta lucha le costó a España 1 200 000 muertos entre combatientes y civiles", Pazos Beceiro, Carlos (2004), La globalización económica neoliberal y la guerra, ISBN 978-9597071266, p. 116) 1,124,257, (Note: initial estimate of Ramón Salas Larrazábal, El mito del millón de muertos, includes victims of malnutrition, cold etc, includes birth deficit assumed to be caused by the war) 1,000,000, (Note: Lee, Stephen J. (2000), European Dictatorships, 1918–1945, ISBN 978-0415230452, p. 248; "a reasonable estimate, and a rather conservative one", Howard Griffin, John, Simon, Yves René (1974), Jacques Maritain: Homage in Words and Pictures, ISBN 978-0873430463, p. 11; military casualties only, Ash, Russell (2003), The Top 10 of Everything 2004, ISBN 978-0789496591, p. 68; lowest considered estimate, Brennan (1978), p. 20. The phrase of "one million dead" became a cliche since the 1960s, and many older Spaniards might repeat that "yo siempre había escuchado lo del millon de muertos", compare burbuja service, available here. This is so due to extreme popularity of a 1961 novel Un millón de muertos by José María Gironella, even though the author many times declared that he had in mind those "muerto espiritualmente", referred after Diez Nicolas, Juan (1985), La mortalidad en la Guerra Civil Española, [in:] Boletín de la Asociación de Demografía Histórica III/1, p. 42. Scholars claim also that the figure of "one million deaths" was continuously repeated by Francoist authorities "to drive home the point of having saved the country form ruin", Encarnación, Omar G. (2008), Spanish Politics: Democracy After Dictatorship, ISBN 978-0745639925, p. 24, and became one of the "mitos principales del franquismo", referred as "myth no. 9" in Reig Tapia, Alberto (2017), La crítica de la crítica: Inconsecuentes, insustanciales, impotentes, prepotentes y equidistantes, ISBN 978-8432318658)
+ 900,000	909,000, (Note: 145,000 KIA, 134,000 executed, 630,000 due to sickness, cold etc., Guerre civile d'Espagne, [in:] Encyclopedie Larousse online, available here) 900,000
+ 800,000	800,000 (Note: maximum considered estimate, Griffin, Julia Ortiz, Griffin, William D. (2007), Spain and Portugal: A Reference Guide from the Renaissance to the Present, ISBN 978-0816074761, p. 49, "[war] generated around 800,000 deaths", Laia Balcells (2011), Death is in the Air: Bombings in Catalonia, 1936–1939, [in:] Reis 136, p. 199)
+ 700,000	750,000, (Note: "the war cost about 750,000 Spanish lives", A Dictionary of World History (2006), ISBN 978-0192807007, p. 602; also "la poblacion de Espana en 1939 contaba 750,000 personas menos que las esperables si no hubiera habido guerra", ¿Cuántas víctimas se cobró la Guerra Civil? ¿Dónde hubo más?, [in:] El Pais 27 February 2019 [accessed 7 December 2019]) 745,000, (Note: Coatsworth, John, Cole, Juan, Hanagan, Michael P., Perdue, Peter C., Tilly, Charles, Tilly, Louise (2015), Global Connections, ISBN 978-0521761062, p. 379; divided into 700,000 died "in battle", 30,000 executed and 15,000 of air raids, Dupuy, R. Ernest, Dupuy, Trevor N. (1977), The Encyclopedia of Military History, ISBN 0060111399, p. 1032, the same breakdown in The Encyclopedia of World History (2001), ISBN 978-0395652374, p. 692, and in Teed, Peter (1992),A Dictionary of Twentieth-Century History, ISBN 0192852078, p. 439) 700,000 (Note: 600,000 killed during the war + 100,000 executed afterwards, Tucker, Spencer C. (2016), World War II: The Definitive Encyclopedia and Document Collection, ISBN 978-1851099696, p. 1563; Georges Soria, Guerra y Revolucion en Espana (1936–1939), vol. 5, Barcelona 1978, p. 87)
+ 600,000	665,300, 650,000, 640,000, (Note: when referring reported calculations of Hugh Thomas and divided into 320,000 KIA, 100,000 executed and 220,000 of malnutrition etc., Crow, John Armstrong (1985), Spain: The Root and the Flower : an Interpretation of Spain and the Spanish People, ISBN 978-0520051331, p. 342) 625,000, (Note: highest considered estimate, Tusell, Javier (1998), Historia de España en el siglo XX. Tomo III. La Dictadura de Franco, ISBN 8430603328, p. 625) 623,000, 613,000, (Note: including 285,000 KIA, 125,000 civilians "due to war directed causes", 200,000 malnutrition., Sandler, Stanley (2002), Ground Warfare: An International Encyclopedia, vol. 1, ISBN 978-1576073445, p. 160) 611,000, 610,000, (Note: 285,000 in combat, 125,000 executed, 200,000 of malnutrition, Thomas, Hugh (1961), The Spanish Civil War (and other initial editions), referred after Clodfelter, Micheal (2017), Warfare and Armed Conflicts: A Statistical Encyclopedia of Casualty and Other Figures, 1492–2015, ISBN 978-0786474707, p. 339) 600,000
+ 500,000	580,000, (Note: 100,000 in combat, 220,000 rearguard terror, 10,000 in air raids, 200,000 after-war terror, 50,000 malnutrition etc.; Jackson, Gabriel (1965), The Spanish Republic and the Civil War, 1931–1939, ISBN 978-0691007571, referred after Clodfelter (2017), p. 338) 560,000, 540,000, (Note: delta between the total number of deaths recorded in 1936–1942 and the total which would have resulted from extrapolating average annual death total from the 1926–1935 period, Ortega, José Antonio, Silvestre, Javier (2006), Las consecuencias demográficas, [in:] Aceńa, Pablo Martín (ed.), La economía de la guerra civil, ISBN 978-8496467330, p. 76) 530,000, (Note: excluding "50,000 more fatalities in Franco's prison camps during the immediate postwar period", Smele, Jonathan D. (2015), Historical Dictionary of the Russian Civil Wars, 1916–1926, ISBN 978-1442252813, p. 253) 500,000 (Note: approximate, excluding post-war terror; Hepworth, Andrea (2017), Site of memory and dismemory: the Valley of the Fallen in Spain, [in:] Gigliotti, Simone, The Memorialization of Genocide, ISBN 978-1317394167, p. 77; highest considered estimate, Seidman, Michael (2011), The Victorious Counterrevolution: The Nationalist Effort in the Spanish Civil War, ISBN 978-0299249632, p. 172; Britannica Concise Encyclopedia (2008), ISBN 978-1593394929, p. 1795; 200,000 in combat, 125,000 executed, 175,000 of malnutrition, Thomas, Hugh (1977), The Spanish Civil War (and later editions), referred after Clodfelter (2017), p. 339; Nowa encyklopedia powszechna PWN (1995), vol. 2, ISBN 830111097X, p. 778; "probably over.." and including 300,000 KIA, Palmer, Alan (1990), Penguin Dictionary of Twentieth-Century History, ISBN 0140511881, p. 371; KIA + victims of terror only, Lowe, Norman (2013), Mastering modern history, London 2013, ISBN 978-1137276940, p. 345; at least, "lost their lives", Palmowski, Jan (2008), The Dictionary of Contemporary World History, ISBN 978-0199295678, p. 643)
+ 400,000	496,000, (Note: 215,000 in combat, 200,000 killed in rearguard, 70,000 due to wartime hardships, 11,000 civilian victims of military operations; the author later rounds up the total to 0,5m, Alonso Millán, Jesús (2015), La guerra total en España (1936–1939), ISBN 978-1512174137, pp. 403–404) 465,000, (Note: at most 300,000 "violent deaths" + 165,000 above average deaths, Payne, Stanley G. (1987), The Franco Regime, ISBN 978-0299110741, pp. 219–220) 450,000, (Note: highest considered estimate, Du Souich, Felipe (2011), Apuntes de Historia de Espana Para Los Amigos, ISBN 978-1447527336, p. 62; "at least", "killed", Quigley, Caroll (2004), Tragedy and Hope. A History of the World in our Time, ISBN 094500110X, p. 604.) 443,000, 436,000, 420,000, (Note: 200,000 KIA, 200,000 executed, 20,000 executed after the war, excluding "unknown numbers" of civilians killed in military action and "many more" died of malnutrition etc., Preston, Paul (2012), The Spanish holocaust, ISBN 978-0393239669, p. xi) 410,000, (Note: Batchelor, Dawho hn (2011), The Mystery on Highway 599, ISBN 978-1456734756, p. 57) 407,000, (Note: broken down into 120,000 KIA, 15,000 civilians, 107,000 in repression and 165,000 above-the-norm deaths as extracted from calculations of Salas Larrazábal, whose total includes also post-war victims, quoted after Payne 1987, p. 219) 405,000, (Note: highest considered estimate, Jackson, Gabriel (2005), La Republica Espanola y la Guerra Civil, ISBN 8447336336, p. 14) 400,000 (Note: Chislett, William (2013), Spain: What Everyone Needs to Know?, ISBN 978-0199936458, p. 42; "probably", Spielvogel, Jackon J. (2013), Western Civilization: A Brief History, ISBN 978-1133606765, p. 603; Mourre, Michel (1978), Dictionaire Encyclopedique d'Histoire, vol. 3, ISBN 204006513X, p. 1636; broken down into 200,000 KIA and 200,000 executed, Bradford, James. C (2006), International Encyclopedia of Military History, vol. 2, ISBN 0415936616, p. 1209; lowest considered estimate, Tusell, Javier (1998), Historia de España en el siglo XX. Tomo III. La Dictadura de Franco, ISBN 8430603328, p. 625)
+ 300,000	380,000, (Note: highest considered estimate, Bowen, Wayne H. (2006), Spain During World War II, ISBN 978-0826265159, p. 113; 380,000 emerges also (though is not stated explicitly) from sub-totals of Gabriel Jackson (100,000 KIA, 10,000 air raids, 50,000 malnutrition etc., 220,000 reprisals). Gabriel Jackson, The Spanish Republic and the Civil War, 1931–1939, Princeton 1965, p. 539,) 365,000, 350,000, (Note: Julia, Santos, (1999), Victimas de la guerra, ISBN 978-8478809837, referred after Richards, Michael (2006), El régimen de Franco y la política de memoria de la guerra civil española, [in:] Aróstegui, Julio, Godicheau, François (eds.), Guerra Civil: mito y memoria, ISBN 978-8496467125, p. 173; Richards, Michael (2013), After the Civil War: Making Memory and Re-Making Spain Since 1936, ISBN 978-0521899345, p. 6; Renshaw, Layla (2016), Exhuming Loss: Memory, Materiality and Mass Graves of the Spanish Civil War, ISBN 978-1315428680, p. 22) 346,000, (Note: delta between the total number of deaths recorded in 1936–1939 and the total which would have resulted from extrapolating average annual death total from the 1926–1935 period, Ortega, Silvestre (2006), p. 76) 344,000, (Note: does not include post-war losses, Payne, Stanley G. (2012), The Spanish Civil War, ISBN 978-0521174701, p. 245) 340,000, (Note: "not counting the many thousand who died in the post-war repression or were lost to the ravages of disease and malnutrition, some 340,000 people had been killed: 200,000 on the battlefield, 75,000 in the Nationalist limpieza, 55,000 in the Terror and subsequent acts of judicial murder in the Republican zone, and 10,000 in air raids and the like”, Esdaile, Charles J. (2018), The Spanish Civil War: A Military History, ISBN 9780429859298, p. 310) 335,000, (Note: lowest considered estimate, includes 150,000 KIA and 185,000 victims of rearguard repression, Bernecker, Walter L. (ed., 2008), Spanien heute: Politik, Wirtschaft, Kultur, ISBN 978-3865274182, p. 109) 330,000, (Note: lowest considered estimate, Du Souich (2011), p. 62; lowest considered estimate, Jackson (2005), p. 14; 1943 estimate of the Spanish Direccion General de Estadistica, referred after Puche, Javier (2017), Economia, mercado y bienestar humano durante la Guerra Civil Espanola, [in:] Contenciosa V/7, p. 13) 328,929, (Note: 137,000 KIA, the rest victims of repression, Lauge Hansen, Hans (2013), Auto-Reflection on the Processes of Cultural Re-Memoriation in the Contemporary Spanish Memory Novel, [in:] Nathan R. White (ed.), War, ISBN 978-1626181991, p. 90) 310,000, 300,000 (Note: "at least", Hart, Stephen M. (1998), "!No Pasarán!": Art, Literature and the Spanish Civil War, ISBN 978-0729302869, p. 16, Preston, Paul (2003), The Politics of Revenge: Fascism and the Military in 20th-century Spain, ISBN 978-1134811137, p. 40; lowest considered estimate, Seidman, Michael (2011), The Victorious Counterrevolution: The Nationalist Effort in the Spanish Civil War, ISBN 978-0299249632, p. 172; Camps, Pedro Montoliú (2005), Madrid en la Posguerra, ISBN 978-8477371595, p. 375, "at most", excluding deaths from malnutrition etc., The New Encyclopædia Britannica (2017), vol. 11, ISBN 978-1593392925, p. 69; of which 140,000 in combat, Большая Российская энциклопедия, (2008), vol. 12, ISBN 978-5852703439, p. 76)
+ 200,000	290,000, (Note: highest considered estimate, 150,000 in combat and 140,000 executed, Moa, Pio (2015), Los mitos del franquismo, ISBN 978-8490603741, p. 44) 270,000, (Note: "at least", Hitchcock, William L. (2008), The Struggle for Europe: The Turbulent History of a Divided Continent 1945 to the Present, ISBN 978-0307491404, p. 271) 265,000, (Note: 100,000 in combat, 135,000 executed, 30,000 other causes. Muñoz, Miguel A. (2009). Reflexiones en torno a nuestro pasado (in Spanish). Cultivalibros. p. 375. ISBN 978-8499231464.) 256,825, (Note: "muertos a causa de la Guerra", includes victims of post-war terror. The figure is based on totals reported as "violent deaths" in the official statistics for 1936–1942 and calculated by Ramón Tamames, Breve historia de la Guerra Civil espanola, Barcelona 2011, ISBN 978-8466650359, chapter "Impactos demograficos" (page unavailable). Tamames suggests that the actual number of victims is probably much higher than this given by official statistics) 255,000, (Note: lowest considered estimate, 145,000 in combat and 110,000 executed, Moa (2015), p. 44) 250,000, (Note: lowest considered estimate, Bowen (2006), p. 113) 231,000 (Note: 103,000 executed during the war, 28,000 executed afterwards, around 100,000 KIA, Martínez de Baños Carrillo, Fernando, Szafran, Agnieszka (2011), El general Walter, ISBN 978-8492888061, p. 324)
+ 100,000	170,489, (Note: the total reported as "muerte violenta o casual" for 1936–1939 in official statistics released by Instituto Nacional de Estadistica in 1943, might include accidental deaths (car accidents etc.) and covers all months of 1936 and 1939, excludes "homicidio" category (39,028 for 1936–1939), referred after Diez Nicolas (1985), p. 54) 149,213 (Note: the number which emerges from the official statistics as provided during the early Francoist era and calculated later by Ramón Tamames, who analyses the figures released in 1951 by Instituto Nacional de Estadistica. Tamames added figures reported in the "violent deaths" rubric for 1936, 1937 and 1938 and 25% of the same category for 1939; then he deducted annual averages for "violent deaths" reported by INE in the mid-1930s to arrive at 149,213. Tamames suggests that the actual figure is probably "mucho mayor", Tamames (2011))

The death toll of the Spanish Civil War is unclear and remains—especially in part related to war and postwar repression—controversial. Many general historiographic works—notably in Spain—refrain from advancing any figures or at best propose general descriptions. (Note: "provocó un número de caidós en combate sin precedentes, casi tantos como los muertos y desaparecidos en la retaguardia", Diccionario de historia y política del siglo XX (2001), ISBN 843093703X, p. 316, "habia comportado centenares de miles de muertos", Marín, José María, Ysàs, Carme Molinero (2001), Historia política de España, 1939–2000, vol. 2, ISBN 978-8470903199, p. 17) (Note: Tusell, Javier, Martín, José Luis, Shaw, Carlos (2001), Historia de España: La edad contemporánea, vol. 2, ISBN 978-8430604357, Pérez, Joseph (1999), Historia de España, ISBN 978-8474238655, Tusell, Javier (2007), Historia de España en el siglo XX, vol. 2, ISBN 978-8430606306) Foreign scholars, especially English-speaking historians, are more willing to offer some general estimates, though some have revised their projections, usually downward, (Note: e.g. Stanley G. Payne reduced his earlier estimate of 465,000 (at most 300,000 "violent deaths" with 165,000 deaths from malnutrition which "must be added", Payne (1987), p. 220) to 344,000 (also "violent deaths" and malnutrition victims, Payne (2012), p. 245); Hugh Thomas in The Spanish Civil War editions from the 1960s opted for 600,000 (285,000 KIA, 125,000 executed, 200,000 malnutrition), in editions from the 1970s he reduced the figure to 500,000 (200,000 KIA, 125,000 executed, 175,000 malnutrition), referred after Clodfeler (2017), p. 383 and with slight revisions kept reproducing the figure also in last editions published before his death, compare Thomas, Hugh (2003), La Guerra Civil Española, vol. 2, ISBN 8497598229, p. 993; Gabriel Jackson went down from 580,000 (including 420,000 victims of war and post-war terror), see Jackson (1965) to a range of 405,000–330,000 (including 220,000 to 170,000 victims of war and post-war terror), Jackson (2005), p. 14) and the figures vary from 1 million to 250,000.

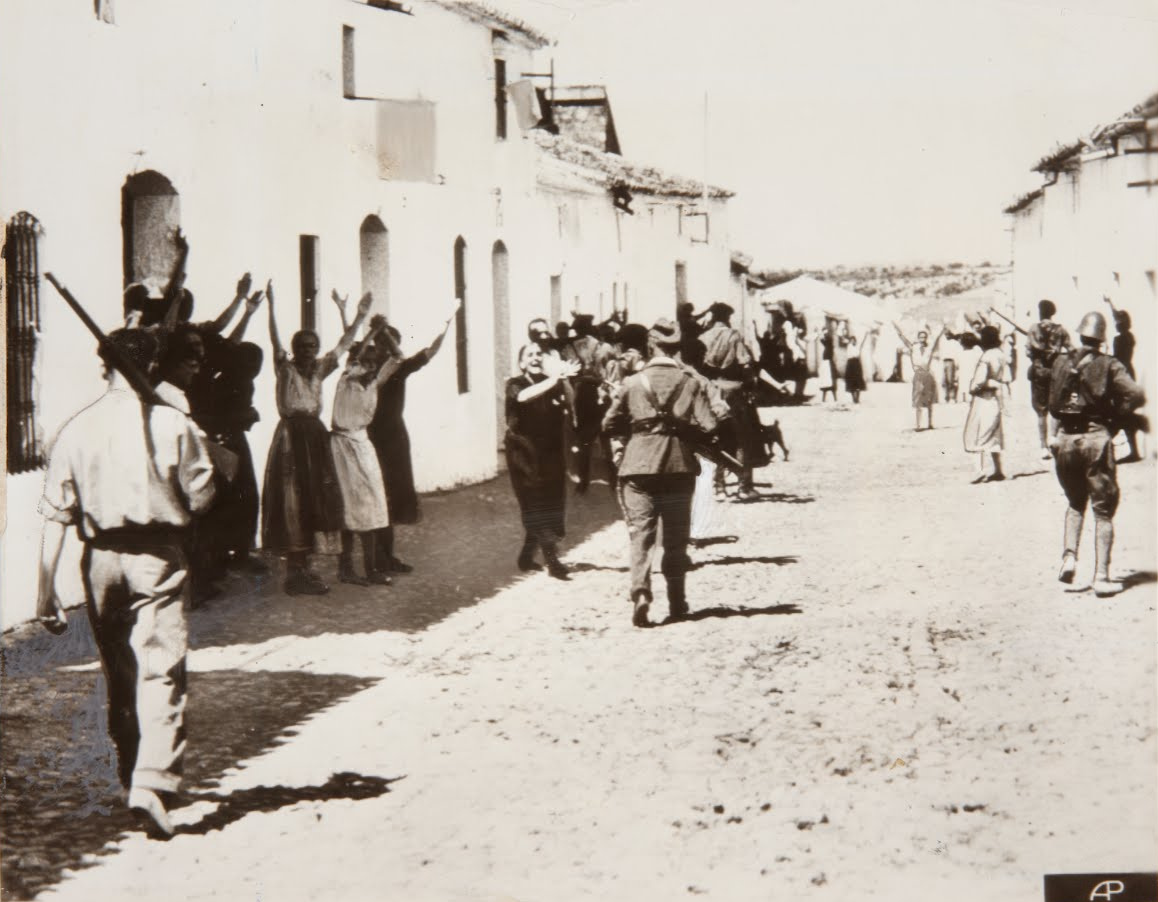
Women pleading with Nationalists for the lives of prisoners, Constantina, 1936

The totals advanced usually include or exclude various categories. Scholars who focus on killings or "violent deaths" most typically list (1) combat and combat-related deaths; figures in this rubric range from 100,000 to 700,000; (2) rearguard terror, both judicial and extrajudicial, recorded until the end of the Civil War: 103,000 to 235,000; (3) civilian deaths from military action, typically air raids: 10,000 to 15,000. These categories combined point to totals from 235,000 to 715,000. Many authors opt for a broader view and calculate "death toll" by adding also (4) above-the-norm deaths caused by malnutrition, hygiene shortcomings, cold, illness, etc. recorded until the end of the Civil War: 30,000 to 630,000. It is not unusual to encounter war statistics which include (5) postwar terror related to Civil War, at times up until 1961: 23,000 to 200,000. Some authors also add (6) foreign combat and combat-related deaths: 3,000 to 25,000, (7) Spaniards killed in World War II: 6,000, (8) deaths related to postwar guerrilla, typically the Invasion of Val d'Aran: 4,000, (9) above-the-norm deaths caused by malnutrition, etc., recorded after the Civil War but related to it: 160,000 to 300,000.

Demographers instead try to gauge the difference between the total number of deaths recorded during the war and the total that would result from applying annual death averages from the 1926–1935 period; this difference is considered excess death resulting from the war. The figure they arrive at for the 1936–1939 period is 346,000; the figure for 1936–1942, including the years of postwar deaths resulting from terror and war sufferings, is 540,000. (Note: Ortega, Silvestre (2006), p. 76; slightly different figures, 344,000 and 558,000, in earlier study completed using the same method, see Diez Nicolas (1985), p. 48.) Some scholars calculate the war's "population loss" or "demographic impact"; in this case they might include also (10) migration abroad: 160,000 (Note: only those who did not return to Spain, Payne (1987), p. 220.) to 730,000 (Note: Ortega, Silvestre (2006), p. 80; the number of migrants usually quoted is 450,000, which refers only to these who crossed to France in the first months of 1939, López, Fernando Martínez (2010), París, ciudad de acogida: el exilio español durante los siglos XIX y XX, ISBN 978-8492820122, p. 252.) and (11) decrease in birth rate: 500,000 (Note: "a deficit of approximately a half million births resulted", Payne (1987), p. 218.) to 570,000. (Note: delta between actual birth totals for 1936–1942 and birth totals which would have resulted from extrapolating average annual birth totals from the 1926–1935 period, Ortega, Silvestre (2006), p. 67.)

== Atrocities ==
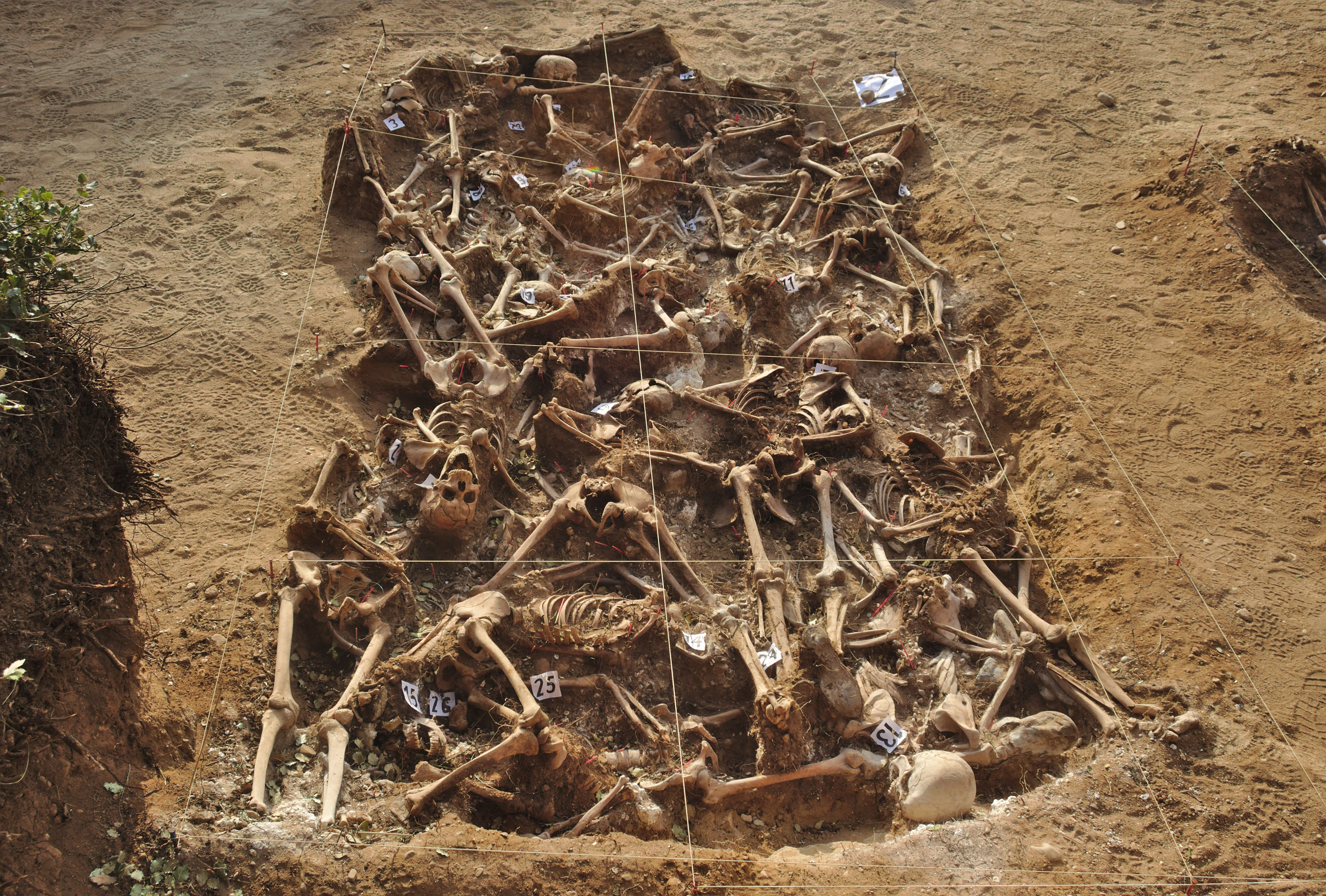
Twenty-six republicans were assassinated by Franco's Nationalists at the beginning of the Spanish Civil War, between August and September 1936. This mass grave is located at the small town of Estépar, in Burgos Province. The excavation occurred in July–August 2014.

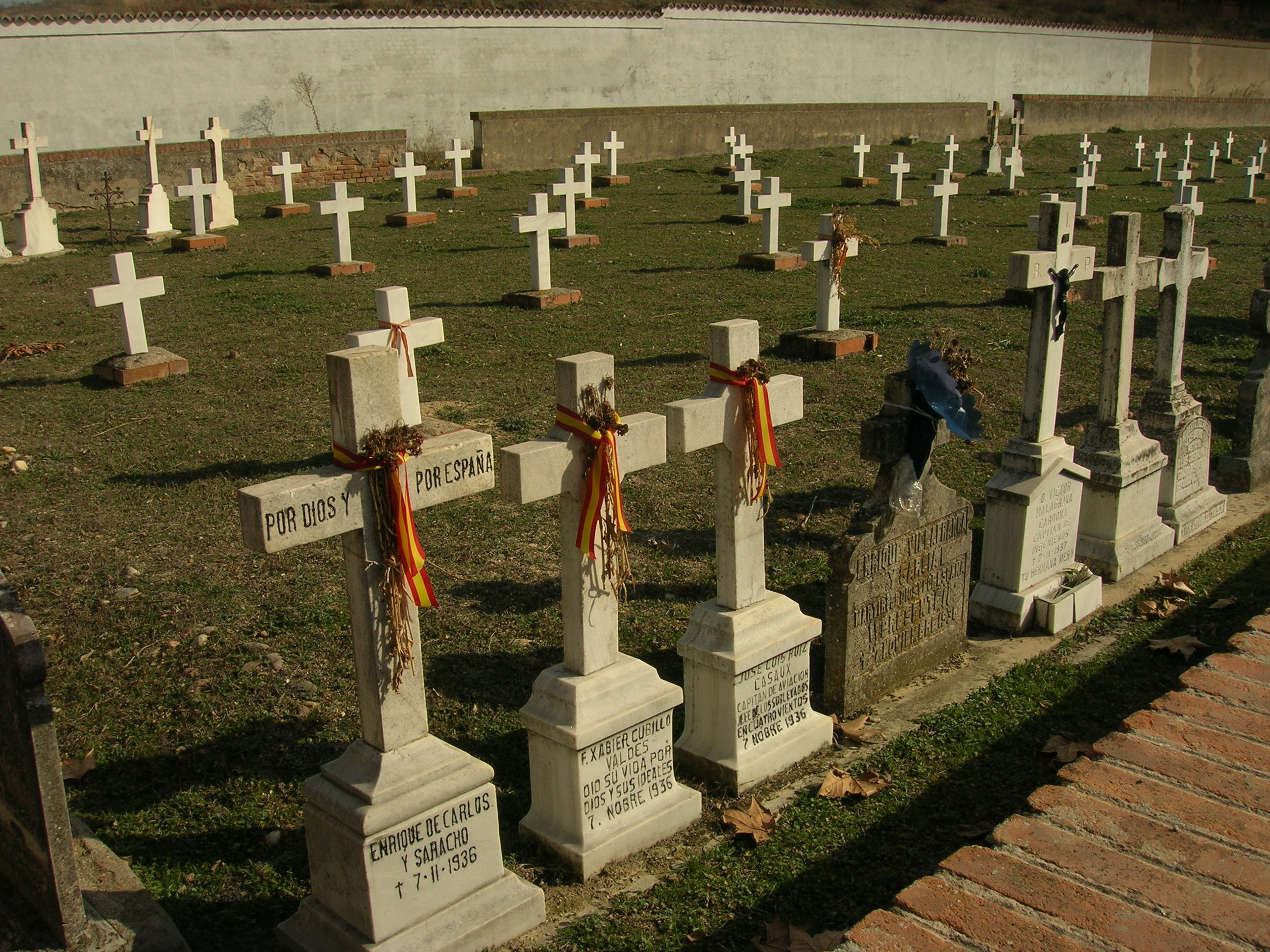
Victims of the Paracuellos massacre committed by the Republicans. The Republicans committed many acts of torture, murder, and war crimes throughout the war known as the Red Terror (Spain).

Death totals remain debated. British historian Antony Beevor wrote in his history of the Civil War that Franco's ensuing "white terror" resulted in the deaths of 200,000 people and that the "red terror" killed 38,000. Julius Ruiz contends that, "Although the figures remain disputed, a minimum of 37,843 executions were carried out in the Republican zone, with a maximum of 150,000 executions (including 50,000 after the war) in Nationalist Spain". Historian Michael Seidman stated that the Nationalists killed approximately 130,000 people and the Republicans approximately 50,000 people.

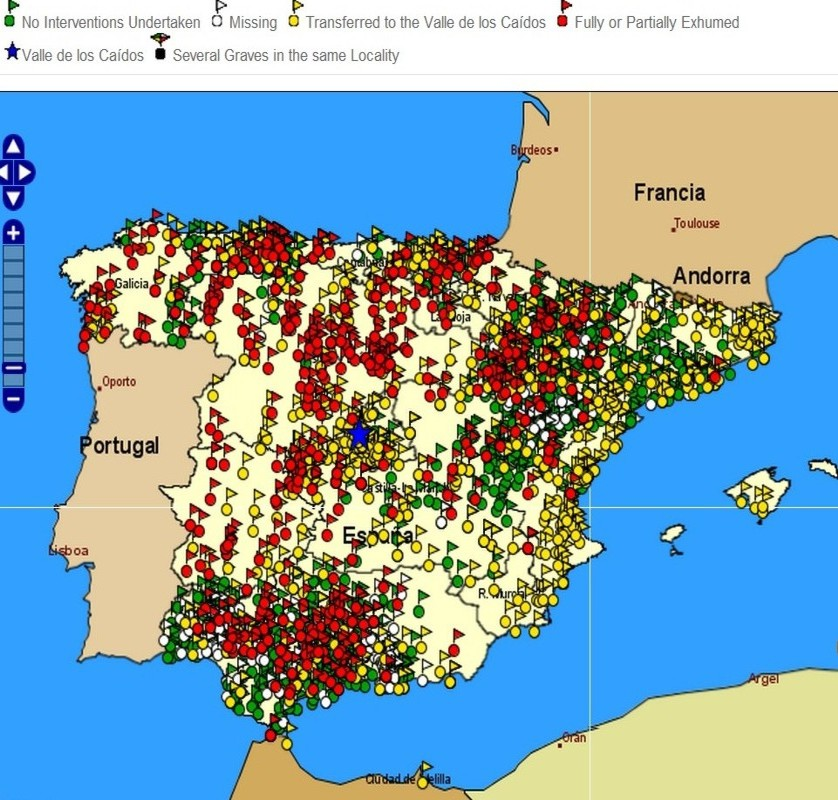
Spanish Civil War grave sites. Location of known burial places. Colours refer to the type of intervention that has been carried out. Green: No Interventions Undertaken so far. White: Missing grave. Yellow: Transferred to the Valle de los Caídos. Red: Fully or Partially Exhumed. Blue star: Valle de los Caídos. Source: Ministry of Justice of Spain

In 2008 a Spanish judge, Baltasar Garzón, opened an investigation into the executions and disappearances of 114,266 people between 17 July 1936 and December 1951. Among the executions investigated was that of the poet and dramatist Federico García Lorca, whose body has never been found. Mention of García Lorca's death was forbidden during Franco's regime.

Research since 2016 has started to locate mass graves, using a combination of witness testimony, remote sensing and forensic geophysics techniques.

Historians such as Helen Graham, Paul Preston, Antony Beevor, Gabriel Jackson and Hugh Thomas argue that the mass executions behind the Nationalist lines were organised and approved by the Nationalist rebel authorities, while the executions behind the Republican lines were the result of the breakdown of the Republican state and chaos:

Though there was much wanton killing in rebel Spain, the idea of the limpieza, the "cleaning up", of the country from the evils which had overtaken it, was a disciplined policy of the new authorities and a part of their programme of regeneration. In republican Spain, most of the killing was the consequence of anarchy, the outcome of a national breakdown, and not the work of the state, although some political parties in some cities abetted the enormities, and some of those responsible ultimately rose to positions of authority.

— Hugh Thomas

Conversely, historians such as Stanley Payne, Julius Ruiz and José Sánchez argue that the political violence in the Republican zone was in fact organized by the left:

In general, this was not an irrepressible outpouring of hatred, by the man in the street for his "oppressors", as it has sometimes been painted, but a semi-organized activity carried out by sections of nearly all the leftist groups. In the entire leftist zone the only organized political party that eschewed involvement in such activity were the Basque Nationalists.

=== Nationalists ===
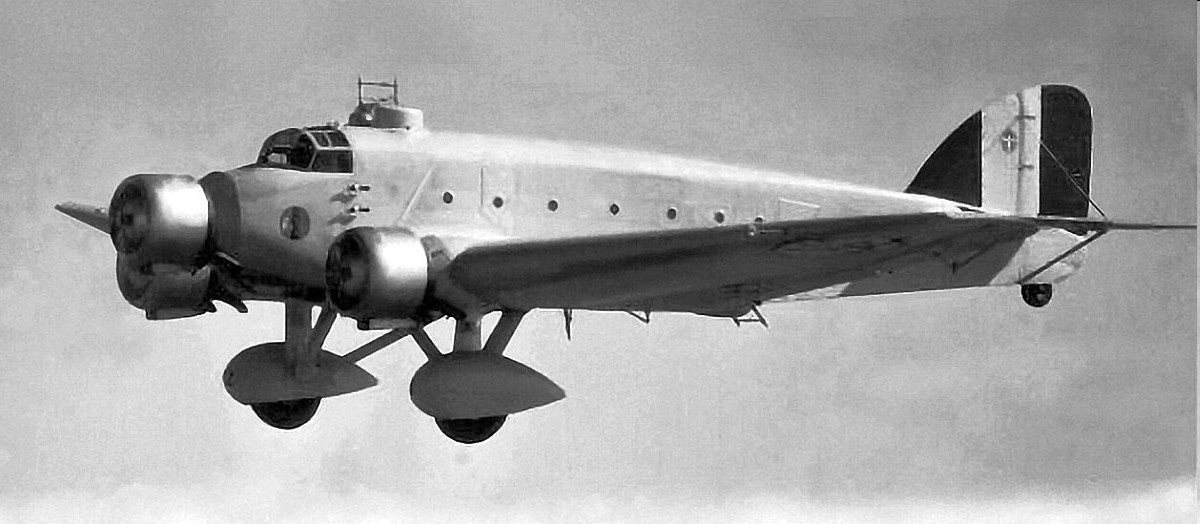
Nationalist SM.81 aircraft bomb Madrid in late November 1936.

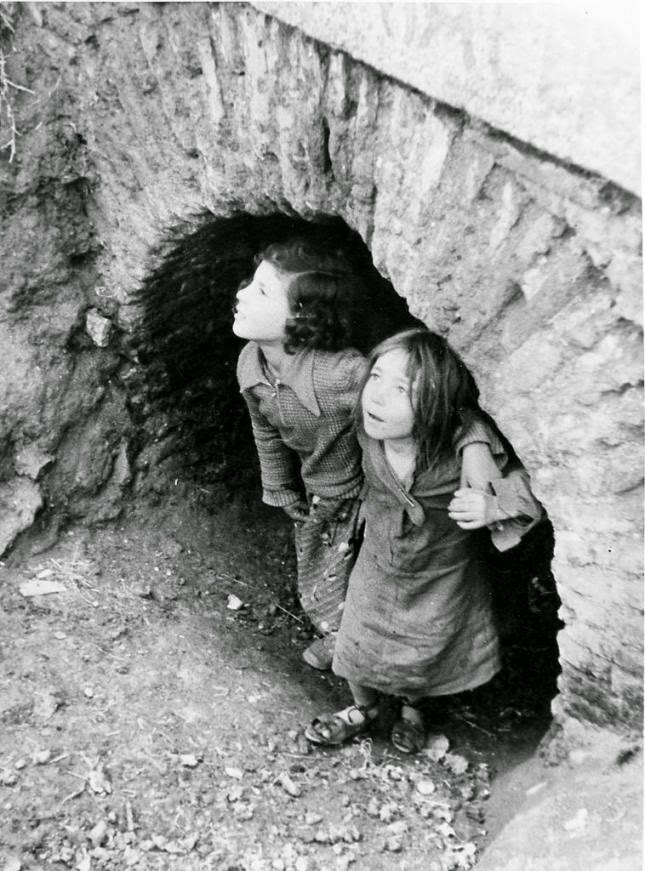
Children take refuge during the Francoist bombing over Madrid (1936–1937). Republicans managed to repel the siege despite the bombing.

Nationalist atrocities, which authorities frequently ordered so as to eradicate any trace of "leftism" in Spain, were common. The notion of a limpieza (cleansing) formed an essential part of the rebel strategy, and the process began immediately after an area had been captured. Estimates of the death toll vary; historian Paul Preston estimates the minimum number of those executed by the rebels as 130,000, while Antony Beevor places the figure much higher at an estimated 200,000 dead. The violence was carried out in the rebel zone by the military, the Civil Guard and the Falange in the name of the regime. Julius Ruiz reports that the Nationalists killed 100,000 people during the war and executed at least 28,000 immediately after. The first three months of the war were the bloodiest, with 50 to 70 percent of all executions carried out by Franco's regime, from 1936 to 1975, occurring during this period.

Many such acts were committed by reactionary groups during the first weeks of the war. This included the execution of schoolteachers, because the efforts of the Second Spanish Republic to promote laicism and displace the Church from schools by closing religious educational institutions were considered by the Nationalists as an attack on the Roman Catholic Church. Extensive killings of civilians were carried out in the cities captured by the Nationalists, along with the execution of unwanted individuals. These included non-combatants such as trade-unionists, Popular Front politicians, suspected Freemasons, Basque, Catalan, Andalusian, and Galician Nationalists, Republican intellectuals, relatives of known Republicans, and those suspected of voting for the Popular Front. The Nationalists also frequently killed military officers who refused to support them in the early days of the coup. Many killings in the first few months were often done by vigilantes and civilian death squads, with the Nationalist leadership often condoning their actions or even assisting them. Post-war executions were conducted by military tribunal, though the accused had limited ways to defend themselves. A large number of the executed were done so for their political activities or positions they held under the Republic during the war, though those who committed their own killings under the Republic were also amongst executed as well. A 2010 analysis of Catalonia argued that Nationalist executions were more likely to occur when they occupied an area that experienced greater prior violence, likely due to pro-Nationalist civilians seeking revenge for earlier actions by denouncing others to the Nationalist forces. Michael Seidman argues that the Nationalists' greater death toll may be partially attributable to their military success resulting in territorial gains and thus more opportunities to enact violence against their enemies. However, during the war, executions declined as the Francoist state began to establish itself.

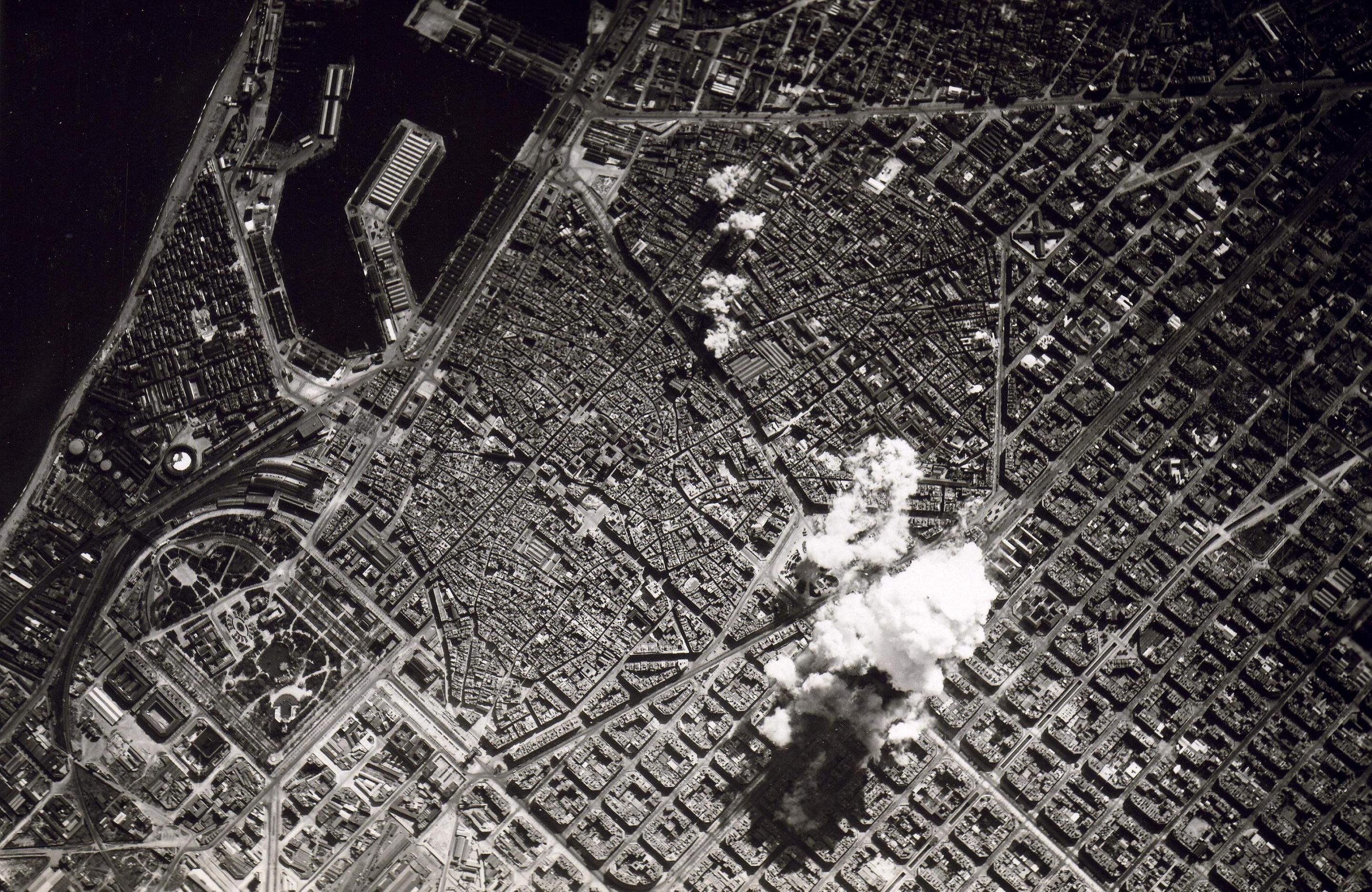
Bombing in Barcelona, 1938

Nationalist forces massacred civilians in Seville, where some 8,000 people were shot; 10,000 were killed in Cordoba; 6,000–12,000 were killed in Badajoz after more than 1,000 landowners and conservatives were killed by the revolutionaries. In Granada, where working-class neighbourhoods were hit with artillery and right-wing squads were given free rein to kill government sympathizers, at least 2,000 people were murdered. In February 1937, over 7,000 were killed after the capture of Málaga. When Bilbao was conquered, thousands of people were sent to prison. There were fewer executions than usual, however, because of the effect Guernica left on Nationalists' reputations internationally. The numbers killed as the columns of the Army of Africa devastated and pillaged their way between Seville and Madrid are particularly difficult to calculate. Landowners who owned the large estates of Southern Spain rode alongside the Army of Africa to reclaim via force of arms the land given to the landless peasants by the Republican government. Rural workers were executed, and it was mockingly joked that they had received their "land reform" in the form of a burial plot.

Nationalists also murdered Catholic clerics. In one particular incident, following the capture of Bilbao, they took hundreds of people, including 16 priests who had served as chaplains for the Republican forces, to the countryside or graveyards and murdered them.

Franco's forces also persecuted Protestants, including murdering 20 Protestant ministers. Franco's forces were determined to remove the "Protestant heresy" from Spain. The Nationalists also persecuted Basques, as they strove to eradicate Basque culture. According to Basque sources, some 22,000 Basques were murdered by Nationalists immediately after the Civil War.

The Nationalist side conducted aerial bombing of cities in Republican territory, carried out mainly by the Luftwaffe volunteers of the Condor Legion and the Italian air force volunteers of the Corpo Truppe Volontarie: Madrid, Barcelona, Valencia, Guernica, Durango, and other cities were attacked. The Bombing of Guernica was the most controversial. The Italian air force conducted a particularly heavy bombing raid on Barcelona in early 1938. While some Nationalist leaders did oppose the bombing of the city—for example, Generals Yagüe and Moscardó, who were noted for being nonconformists, protested against the indiscriminate destruction—other Nationalist leaders, often those of a fascist persuasion, saw bombings as necessary to "cleanse" Barcelona.

Michael Seidman observes that the Nationalist terror was a key part of the Nationalist victory as it allowed them to secure their rear; the Russian Whites, in their civil war, had struggled to suppress peasant rebellions, bandits and warlordism behind their lines, while the inability of the Chinese Nationalists to stop banditry during the Chinese Civil War did severe damage to the regime's legitimacy. The Spanish Nationalists, in contrast, imposed a puritanically terrorist order on the populace in their territory. They never suffered from serious partisan activity behind their lines and the fact that banditry did not develop into a serious problem in Spain, despite how easy it would have been in such mountainous terrain, demands explanation. Seidman argues that severe terror, combined with control of the food supply, explains the general lack of guerrilla warfare in the Nationalist rear. A 2009 analysis of Nationalist violence argues that evidence supports the view that killings were used strategically by the Nationalists to pre-emptively counter potential opposition by targeting individuals and groups deemed most likely to cultivate future rebellions, thus helping the Nationalists win the war.

=== Republicans ===
Scholars have estimated that between 38,000 and 70,000 civilians were killed in Republican-held territories, with the most common estimate being around 50,000.

Whatever the exact number, the death toll was far exaggerated by both sides, for propaganda reasons, giving birth to the legend of the millón de muertos. (Note: Lee, Stephen J. (2000), European Dictatorships, 1918–1945, ISBN 978-0415230452, p. 248; "a reasonable estimate, and a rather conservative one", Howard Griffin, John, Simon, Yves René (1974), Jacques Maritain: Homage in Words and Pictures, ISBN 978-0873430463, p. 11; military casualties only, Ash, Russell (2003), The Top 10 of Everything 2004, ISBN 978-0789496591, p. 68; lowest considered estimate, Brennan (1978), p. 20. The phrase of "one million dead" became a cliche since the 1960s, and many older Spaniards might repeat that "yo siempre había escuchado lo del millon de muertos", compare burbuja service, available here. This is so due to extreme popularity of a 1961 novel Un millón de muertos by José María Gironella, even though the author many times declared that he had in mind those "muerto espiritualmente", referred after Diez Nicolas, Juan (1985), La mortalidad en la Guerra Civil Española, [in:] Boletín de la Asociación de Demografía Histórica III/1, p. 42. Scholars claim also that the figure of "one million deaths" was continuously repeated by Francoist authorities "to drive home the point of having saved the country form ruin", Encarnación, Omar G. (2008), Spanish Politics: Democracy After Dictatorship, ISBN 978-0745639925, p. 24, and became one of the "mitos principales del franquismo", referred as "myth no. 9" in Reig Tapia, Alberto (2017), La crítica de la crítica: Inconsecuentes, insustanciales, impotentes, prepotentes y equidistantes, ISBN 978-8432318658) Franco's government would later give names of 61,000 victims of the red terrors, but which are not considered objectively verifiable. The deaths would form the prevailing outside opinion of the republic up until the bombing of Guernica.

The leftist Revolution of 1936 that preceded the war was accompanied since the first months by an escalation of leftist anticlerical terror that, between 18 and 31 July alone, killed 839 religious, continuing during the month of August with 2,055 other victims, including 10 bishops killed, that was 42% of the total number of registered victims in that year. Particularly noteworthy repression was conducted in Madrid during the war.

The Republican government was anticlerical, and, when the war began, supporters attacked and murdered Roman Catholic clergy in reaction to the news of military revolt. In his 1961 book, Spanish archbishop Antonio Montero Moreno, who at the time was director of the journal Ecclesia, wrote that 6,832 were killed during the war, including 4,184 priests, 2,365 monks and friars, and 283 nuns (many were first raped before they died), in addition to 13 bishops, a figure accepted by historians, including Beevor. Some of the killings were carried out with extreme cruelty, some were burned to death, there are reports of castration and disembowelment. Some sources claim that by the conflict's end, 20 percent of the nation's clergy had been killed. (Note: Since Beevor (2006) p. 82 suggests 7,000 members of some 115,000 clergy were killed, the proportion could well be lower.) The "Execution" of the Sacred Heart of Jesus by Communist militiamen at Cerro de los Ángeles near Madrid, on 7 August 1936, was the most infamous of widespread desecration of religious property. In dioceses where the Republicans had general control, a large proportion—often a majority—of secular priests were killed. Michael Seidman argues that the hatred of the Republicans for the clergy was in excess of anything else; while local revolutionaries might spare the lives of the rich and right-wingers, they seldom offered the same to priests.

Like clergy, civilians were executed in Republican territories. Some civilians were executed as suspected Falangists. Others died in acts of revenge after Republicans heard of massacres carried out in the Nationalist zone. Even families who simply attended Catholic Mass were hunted down; including children. Air raids committed against Republican cities were another driving factor. Shopkeepers and industrialists were shot if they did not sympathise with the Republicans and were usually spared if they did. Fake justice was sought through commissions, named checas after the Soviet secret police organization.

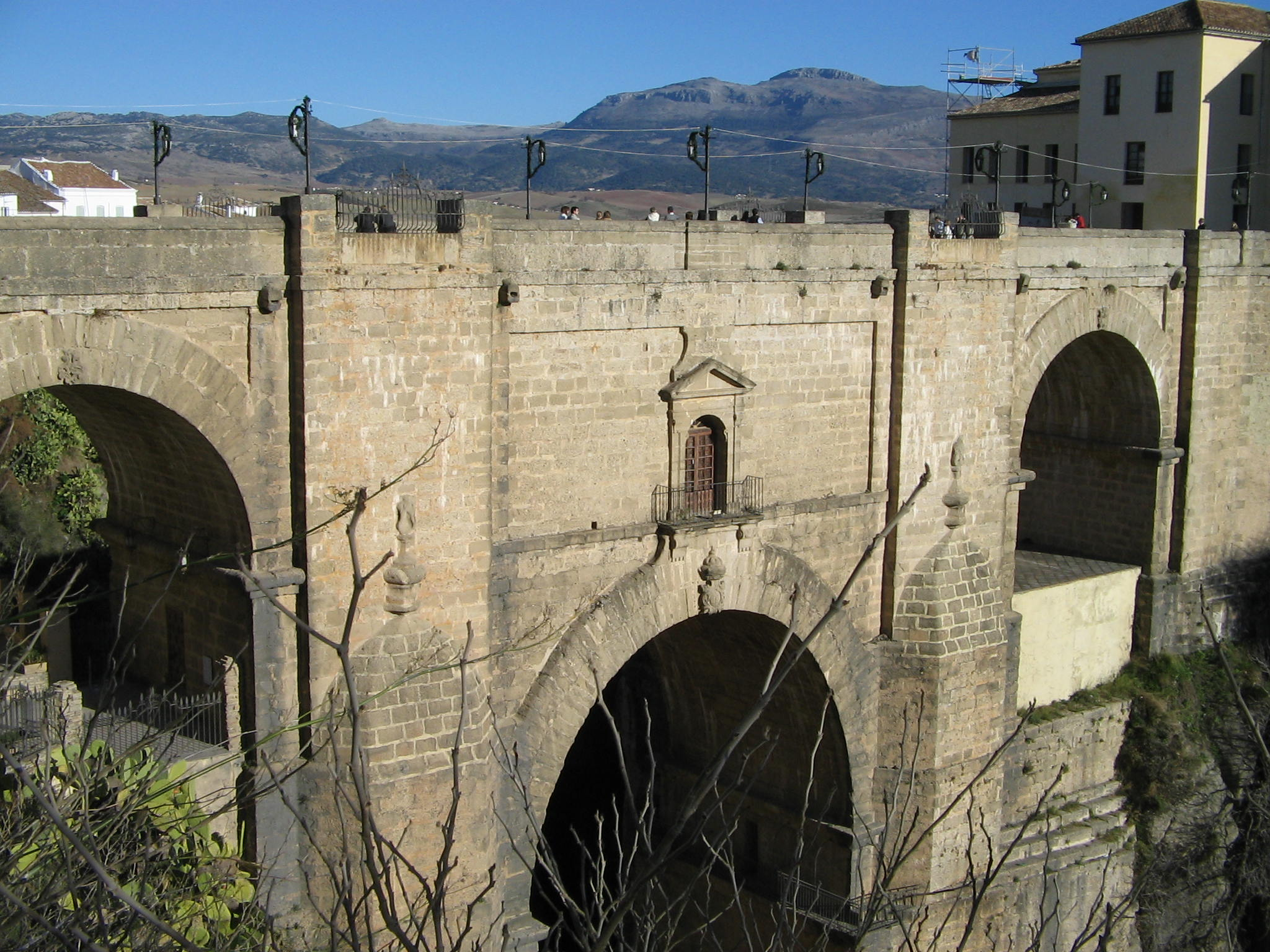
The Puente Nuevo bridge, Ronda. Both Nationalists and Republicans are claimed to have thrown prisoners from the bridge to their deaths in the canyon.

Many killings were done by paseos, impromptu death squads that emerged as a spontaneous practice amongst revolutionary activists in Republican areas. According to Seidman, the Republican government only made efforts to stop the actions of the paseos late in the war; during the first few months, the government either tolerated it or made no efforts to stop it. The killings often contained a symbolic element, as those killed were seen as embodying an oppressive source of power and authority. This was also why the Republicans would kill priests or employers who were not considered to personally have done anything wrong but were nonetheless seen as representing the old oppressive order that needed to be destroyed.

There was infighting between the Republican factions, and the Communists following Stalinism declared the Workers' Party of Marxist Unification (POUM), an anti-Stalinist communist party, to be an illegal organization, along with the Anarchists. The Stalinists betrayed and committed mass atrocities on the other Republican factions, such as torture and mass executions. George Orwell would record this in his Homage to Catalonia as well as write Nineteen Eighty-Four and Animal Farm to criticize Stalinism. As pressure mounted with the increasing success of the Nationalists, many civilians were executed by councils and tribunals controlled by competing Communist and anarchist groups. Some members of the latter were executed by Soviet-advised communist functionaries in Catalonia, as recounted by George Orwell's description of the purges in Barcelona in 1937 in which followed a period of increasing tension between competing elements of the Catalan political scene. Some individuals fled to friendly embassies, which would house up to 8,500 people during the war.

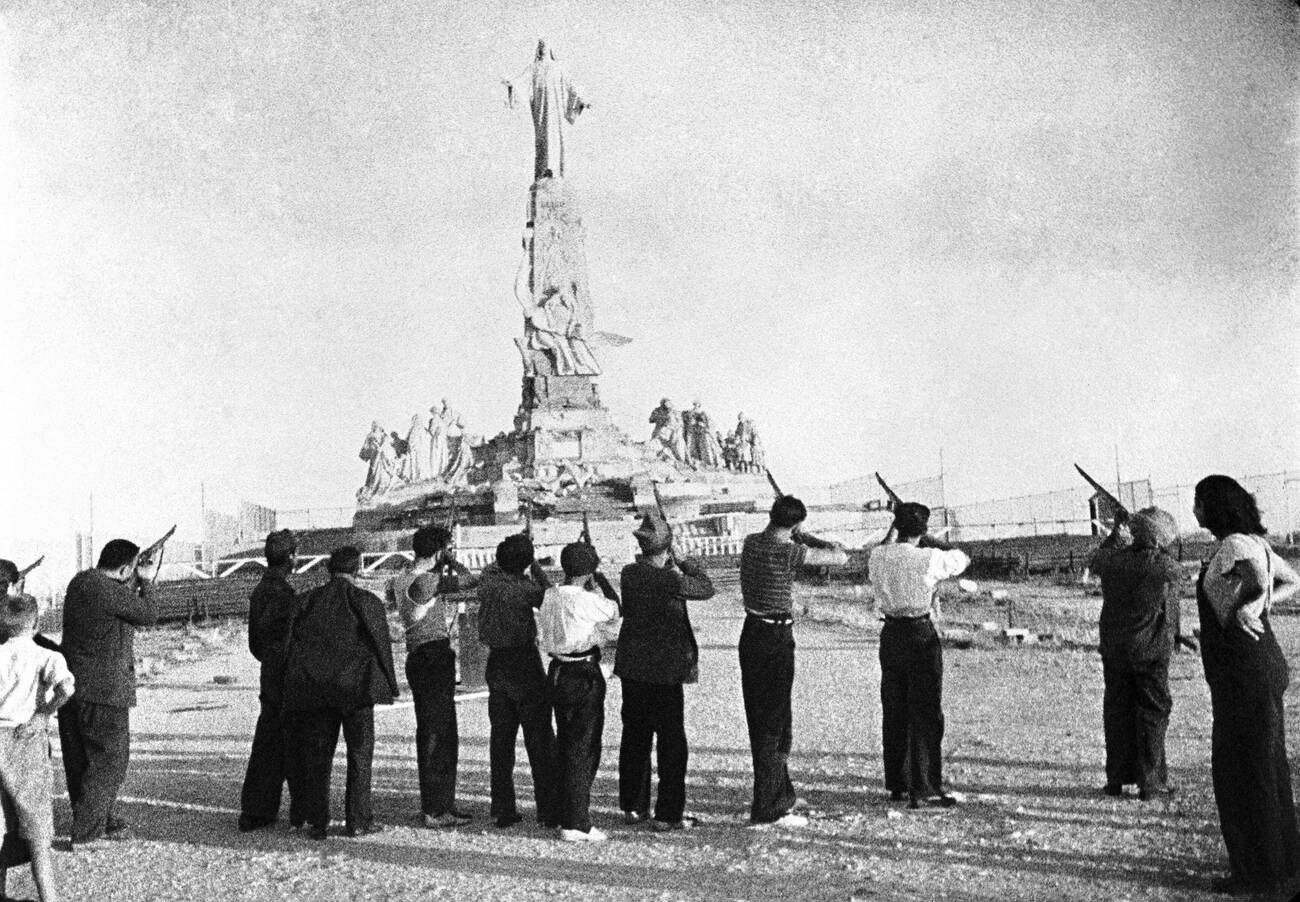
"Execution" of the Sacred Heart of Jesus by Communist militiamen. The photograph in the London Daily Mail had the caption "Spanish Reds' war on religion".

In the Andalusian town of Ronda, 512 suspected Nationalists were executed in the first month of the war. Communist Santiago Carrillo Solares was accused of the killing of Nationalists in the Paracuellos massacre near Paracuellos de Jarama. Pro-Soviet Communists committed numerous atrocities against fellow Republicans, including other Marxists: André Marty, known as the Butcher of Albacete, was responsible for the deaths of some 500 members of the International Brigades. Andrés Nin, leader of the POUM (Workers' Party of Marxist Unification), and many other prominent POUM members, were murdered by the Communists, with the help of the USSR's NKVD.

The Republicans also conducted their own bombing attacks on cities, such as the bombing of Cabra; according to Stanley G. Payne, their attacks were often weak and ineffective. Michael Seidman argues that the better trained Nationalist air force was more effective at inflicting casualties, killing an estimated 11,000 civilians compared to approximately 4,000 for the Republican air force.

38,000 people were killed in the Republican zone during the war, 17,000 of whom were killed in Madrid or Catalonia within a month of the coup. While the Communists were forthright in their support of extrajudicial killings, much of the Republican side was appalled by the murders. Azaña came close to resigning. He, alongside other members of Parliament and a great number of other local officials, attempted to prevent Nationalist supporters from being lynched. Some of those in positions of power intervened personally to stop the killings.

== Art and propaganda ==
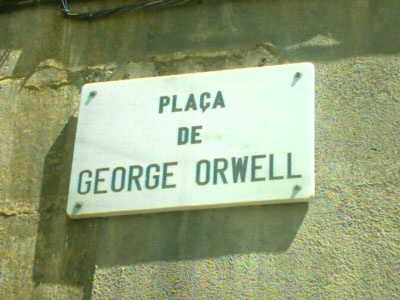
In Catalonia, a square near the Barcelona waterfront named Plaça de George Orwell

Throughout the Spanish Civil War, people all over the world were exposed to the goings-on and effects of it on its people not only through standard art, but also through propaganda. Motion pictures, posters, books, radio programs, and leaflets are a few examples of this media art that was so influential during the war. Produced by both nationalists and republicans, propaganda allowed Spaniards a way to spread awareness about their war all over the world. A film co-produced by famous early-twentieth century authors such as Ernest Hemingway and Lillian Hellman was used as a way to advertise Spain's need for military and monetary aid. This film, The Spanish Earth, premiered in America in July 1937. In 1938, George Orwell's Homage to Catalonia, a personal account of his experiences and observations in the war, was published in the United Kingdom. In 1939, Jean-Paul Sartre published in France a short story, The Wall in which he describes the last night of prisoners of war sentenced to death by shooting.

Leading works of sculpture include Alberto Sánchez Pérez's El pueblo español tiene un camino que conduce a una estrella ("The Spanish People Have a Path that Leads to a Star"), a plaster monolith representing the struggle for a socialist utopia; Julio González's La Montserrat, an anti-war work which shares its title with a mountain near Barcelona, is created from a sheet of iron which has been hammered and welded to create a peasant mother carrying a small child in one arm and a sickle in the other. and Alexander Calder's Fuente de mercurio (Mercury Fountain) a protest work by the American against the Nationalist forced control of Almadén and the mercury mines there.

Salvador Dalí responded to the conflict in his homeland with two powerful oil paintings in 1936: Soft Construction with Boiled Beans: A Premonition of Civil War (Philadelphia Museum of Art) and Autumnal Cannibalism (Tate Modern, London).Joan Miró created El Segador (The Reaper) in 1937, formally titled El campesino catalán en rebeldía (Catalan peasant in revolt). Pablo Picasso painted Guernica in 1937, inspired by the bombing of Guernica. The work's size (3.49 m by 7.76 m) grabbed much attention and cast the horrors of the mounting Spanish civil unrest into a global spotlight. The painting has since been heralded as an antiwar work and a symbol of peace in the 20th century.

The famous poet Federico Garcia Lorca was executed by the nationals day 18 August 1936 as condemned for his homosexuality and his left leaning political belief affirmation by his executioners and historical consensus.

The Army of Africa would feature a place in propaganda on both sides, due to the complex history of the Army and Spanish colonialism in North Africa.

== Consequences ==
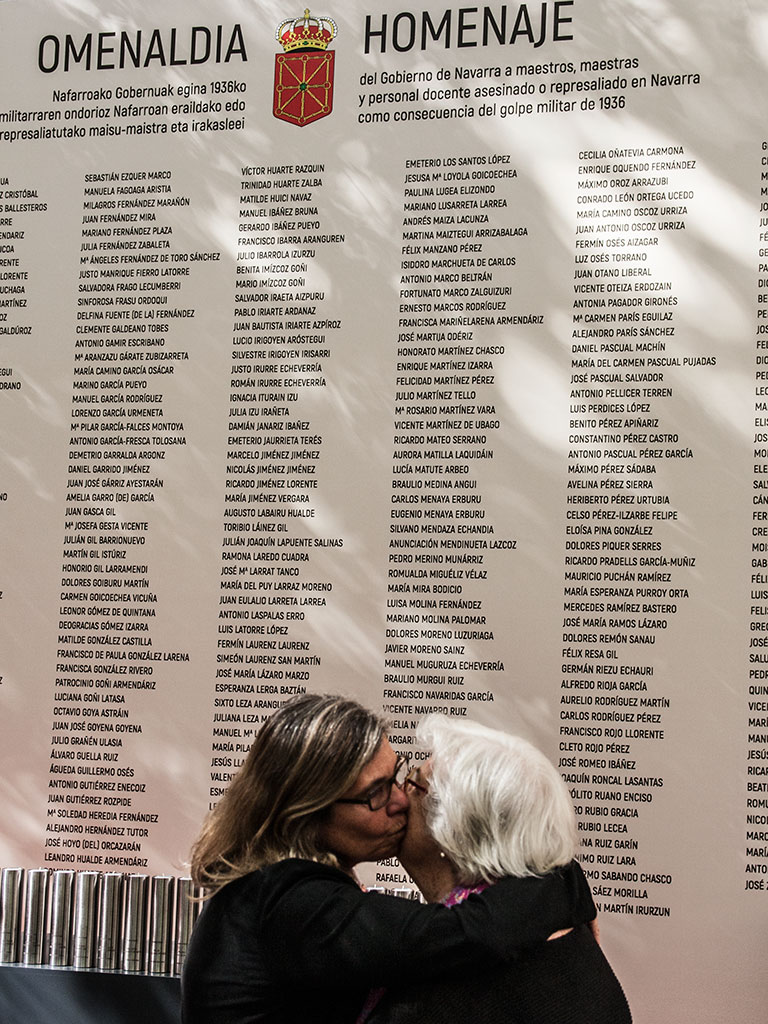
Tribute and plaque in memory of murdered or persecuted teachers, Navarre, 1936 and later

Costs for the war on both sides were very high. Monetary resources on the Republican side were completely drained from weapons acquisition. On the Nationalist side, the biggest losses came after the conflict, when they had to let Germany exploit the country's mining resources, so until the beginning of World War II they barely had the chance to make any profit.

The political and emotional repercussions of the War transcended the national scale, becoming a precursor to the Second World War. The war has frequently been described by historians as the "prelude to" or the "opening round of" the Second World War. Historian Stanley Payne suggests that this view is an incorrect summary of the geopolitic position of the interwar period, arguing that the Spanish Civil War was a far more clear-cut revolutionary and counter-revolutionary struggle between the left and right wings, while the Second World War initially had fascists and communist powers on the same side with the combined Nazi-Soviet invasion of Poland. Payne suggests that instead the civil war was the last of the revolutionary crises that emerged from the First World War.

After the war, Spanish policy leaned heavily towards Germany, Portugal and Italy, since they had been the greatest Nationalist supporters and aligned with Spain ideologically. However, the end of the Civil War and later the Second World War saw the isolation of the country from most other nations until the 1950s.

== See also ==
- Catholicism in the Second Spanish Republic
  - Martyrs of the Spanish Civil War
- The Falling Soldier
- Foreign involvement in the Spanish Civil War
- Jewish volunteers in the Spanish Civil War
- Pacifism in Spain
- Political parties and organizations in the Spanish Civil War
- Spain in World War II
  - Invasion of Val d'Aran
  - Spain and the Holocaust
  - Blue Division
- SS Cantabria (1919)
- Exiles of the Spanish Civil War
  - Spanish Republican exiles

=== Legions ===
- Aviazione Legionaria
- Condor Legion

=== Timelines ===
- Timeline of events preceding World War II
- Timeline of the Spanish Civil War

=== People ===
- Gerardo Caballero
- Robert Capa
- Hugo Jaeger

=== Lists ===
- List of Spanish Nationalist military equipment of the Spanish Civil War
- List of weapons of the Corpo Truppe Volontarie
- List of Spanish Republican military equipment of the Spanish Civil War
- List of foreign correspondents in the Spanish Civil War
- List of foreign ships wrecked or lost in the Spanish Civil War
- List of war films and TV specials set between 1914 and 1945#Spanish Civil War (1936–1939)
