= Juan Simeón Vidarte =

Spanish lawyer and socialist politician

Juan Simeón Vidarte Franco-Romero (Llerena, 8 May 1902 - Mexico City, 29 October 1976) was a Spanish lawyer and socialist politician. He was deputy secretary general of the Spanish Socialist Workers' Party (Spanish: Partido Socialista Obrero Español - PSOE) between 1932 and 1939, and secretary of the Congress of Deputies during the first legislature of the Second Spanish Republic (1931–1933). After the Spanish Civil War, he went into exile in Mexico.

== Biography ==
He studied law at the Complutense University of Madrid, where he joined the Socialist Youth of Spain (Spanish: Juventudes Socialistas de España) the youth organisation of the PSOE. He was a member of its executive committee in 1929-1930 and deputy secretary from February 1932 to April 1934. He joined the Madrid Socialist Group (Spanish: Agrupación Socialista Madrileña) of the PSOE in 1930 and was deputy secretary of its Executive Committee from October 1932 to April 1939.

He was a member of parliament for Badajoz in the three elections (1931, 1933 and 1936) held during the Second Republic, a period in which he was very active in parliament.

During the Civil War, and as a member of the Executive Committee of the PSOE, which was already totally controlled by the centrist faction, as well as a personal friend of both Indalecio Prieto and Juan Negrín, he had governmental responsibilities from the formation of Francisco Largo Caballero's first government in September 1936. After the appointment of Negrín as Minister of Finance, he was part of his cabinet as head of special missions to foreign banks, and, for instance, extra-official confidential missions to procure arms for the Republic despite the embargo imposed by the Non-Intervention Agreement. When Negrín became Prime Minister, Vidarte became undersecretary of the Ministry of the Interior under Julián Zugazagoitia.

In September 1937 Negrín entrusted Vidarte with a very confidential mission, so delicate that even President Manuel Azaña was unaware of it. As minister plenipotentiary of the Republican Government, he went to Mexico, the only country openly in favour of the Republican cause, to ask President Lázaro Cárdenas for permission to take in a large number of Republican exiles if necessary, and obtained a commitment from the president that, in such an eventuality, the Mexican government would be willing to accept the refugees who would "find in Mexico their second homeland".

The PSOE expelled Vidarte and a number of additional party members, such as Negrín, through a note published in El Socialista on 23 April 1946. (He was post-humously rehabilitated by the PSOE in 2008.)

Exiled in Mexico and cut off from socialist organisations, he devoted himself to various commercial and academic activities and to writing his memoirs. He died in Mexico City on 29 August 1976.

== Publications ==
- (in Spanish) Tempestad en África. De Gaulle contra Petain, México, 1941
- (in Spanish) Ante la tumba de Lázaro Cárdenas, México, 1971
- (in Spanish) Todos fuimos culpables. Testimonio de un socialista español, México, 1973. (Subsequent edition in Spain, Barcelona, Grijalbo, 1978)
- (in Spanish) Las Cortes constituyentes de 1931-1933, Barcelona, Grijalbo, 1976
- (in Spanish) No queríamos al Rey: testimonio de un socialista español, Barcelona, 1977
- (in Spanish) El bienio negro y la insurrección de Asturias: testimonio, Barcelona, 1978
- (in Spanish) Prólogo del libro de Ramón Martínez Zaldua, Historia de la Masonería en Hispanoamérica ¿Es o no Religión la Masonería?, Costa Amic Editor, 1968.

== Sources ==
- (in Spanish) "Biografía de Juan Simeón Vidarte Franco-Romero". Diccionario Biográfico electrónico de la Real Academia de la Historia.
- (in Spanish) Jackson, Gabriel (2008). Juan Negrín: médico, socialista y jefe del Gobierno de la II República española. Madrid: Critica. ISBN 978-84-84329-96-1.
- (in Spanish) Mateas, Abdón (2002). "Los republicanos españoles en el México cardenista" (PDF). Ayer: Revista de Historia Contemporánea (47). Madrid: Asociación de Historia Contemporánea: 245–264. ISSN 2255-5838.
- (in Spanish) Matesanz, José Antonio (1999). Las raíces del exilio: México ante la Guerra Civil Española, 1936-1939. México DF: El Colegio de México (Universidad Nacional Autónomo de México). ISBN 968-12-0910-9.
- (in Spanish) Moradiellos, Enrique (2000). "El enigma del doctor Juan Negrín: Perfil político de un gobernante socialista". Revista de Estudios Políticos (109). Madrid: Centro de Estudios Políticos y Constitucionales: 245–264. ISSN 0048-7694.
- (in Spanish) Sánchez Andrés, Agustín; Straka, Tomás (2018). "El exilio republicano español en México y Venezuela. Paralelismos y divergencias". Dimensión Antropológica (25, vol. 74). México DF: Instituto Nacional de Antropología e Historia de México: 59–87. ISSN 1405-776X.
- (in Spanish) Vidarte, Juan Simeón (1973). Todos fuimos culpables: Testimonio de un socialista español. México DF: Fondo de Cultura Económica.
- (in Spanish) Viñas, Ángel (8 July 2008). "Negrín y 35 viejos militantes socialistas". El País.
