= Moscow Gold (Spain) =

510 tonnes of gold transferred from Republican Spain to the Soviet Union in 1936

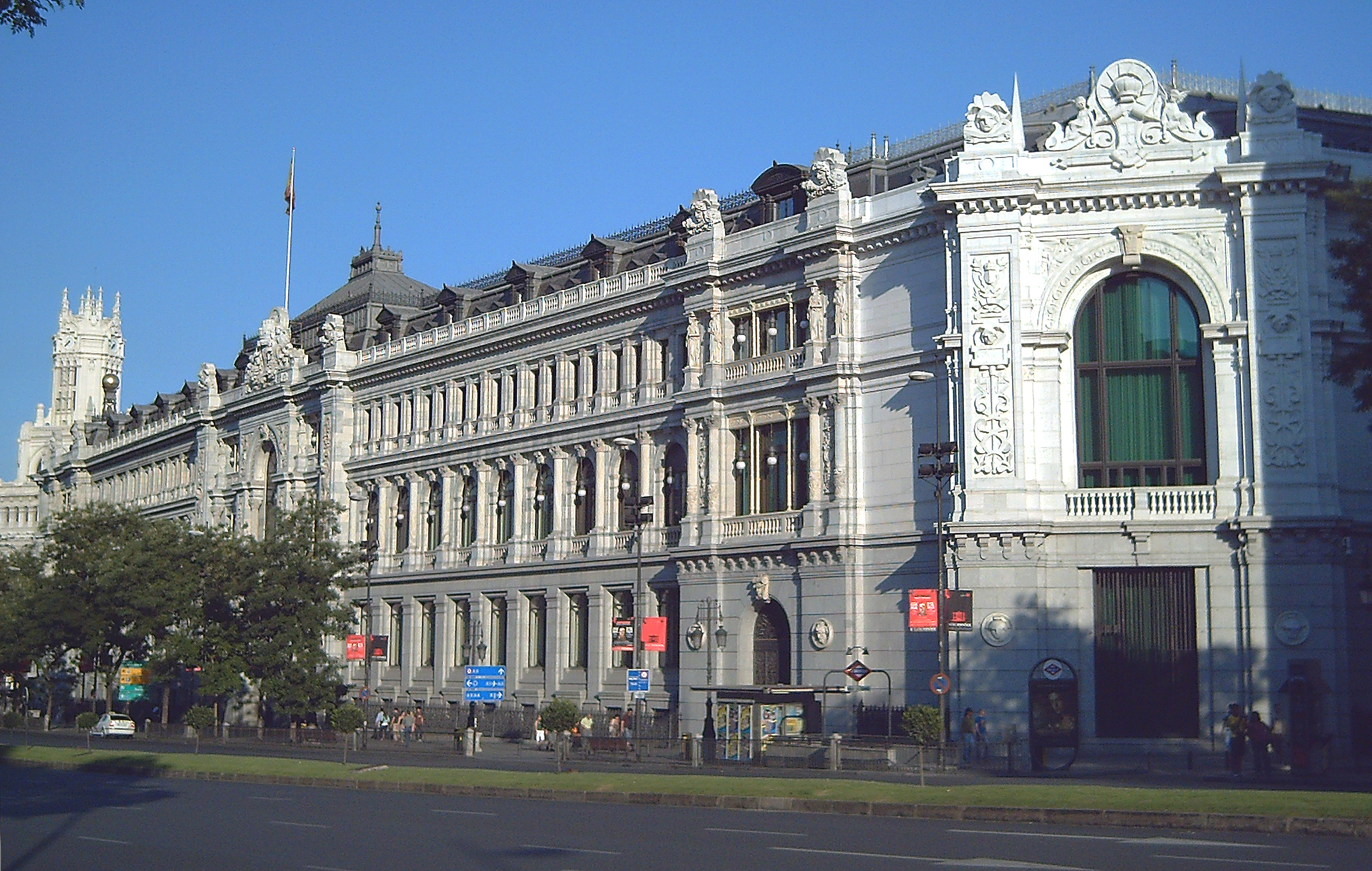
Northern façade of the Bank of Spain in Madrid. Most of the gold reserves held inside until 1936 were sent to the Soviet Union during the Spanish Civil War.

The Moscow Gold (Spanish: Oro de Moscú), or alternatively Gold of the Republic (Spanish: Oro de la República), was 510 tonnes (16,000,000 ozt) of gold, corresponding to 72.6% of the total gold reserves of the Bank of Spain, that were transferred from their original location in Madrid to the Soviet Union a few months after the outbreak of the Spanish Civil War. This transfer was made by order of the government of the Second Spanish Republic, presided over by Francisco Largo Caballero, through the initiative of his Minister of Finance, Juan Negrín. The term also encompasses the subsequent issues relating with the gold's sale to the USSR and the use of the funds obtained. The remaining quarter of the Bank's gold reserves, 193 tonnes (6,200,000 ozt), was transported and exchanged into currency in France, an operation which is also known by analogy as the "Paris Gold".

Since the world now was aware of the existence of a large mass of gold in Moscow, the term "Moscow Gold" would eventually be popularized for any Russian funding worldwide.

Since the 1970s the specific episode in Spanish history has been the focus of many essays and works of literature, many relying on information from official documents and records of the time. It has also been the source of strong controversy and historical debate, especially in Spain. Disagreements are centred on the political interpretation of its motivations, on its supposed usage, its effects on the development of the conflict, its subsequent influence on the exiled Government of the Republic and on the diplomatic relations between the Francoist government and the Soviet Union.

== Background ==
=== Historical context ===
Republican (red) and Nationalist (blue) controlled areas, September 1936. Green areas represent the Nationalist territorial gains since the beginning of the war.

The Spanish Civil War began on July 19, 1936, after a half-failed coup d'état against the government of the Second Spanish Republic by certain factions of the Spanish Army left approximately a third of the country under the control of the rebel forces. The rebels (also known as the Nationalists) under the leadership of a junta (Generals Emilio Mola, José Sanjurjo and Francisco Franco) established negotiations with Italy and Germany in order to seek material support for the war effort. The Republic also established similar negotiations for the same purpose with France. These initiatives led to the progressive internationalization of the conflict, as the lack of military equipment on both sides necessary to continue the war effort became apparent.

At the start of the Spanish Civil War, the political climate in France was uncertain, with a government dominated by a Popular Front which included in its majority the centrist Radical Party. Despite French Prime Minister Léon Blum's support for military intervention in favour of the Republic, combined with the support of the French Communist Party, the Radical Party was opposed and threatened to remove their support for Blum's government. The United Kingdom equally subscribed to such a view, warning of the risk of obstructing the policy of appeasement of the Conservative politician Stanley Baldwin. Thus, the French government approved on July 25, 1936, a measure prohibiting the sending of any supplies from France to either of the belligerent sides. On the same day in which the policy of non-intervention of the Western democracies was confirmed, Adolf Hitler gave his consent for the sending of a first shipment of aeroplanes, crew and technical personnel to the Nationalist side in Morocco. Shortly after, Benito Mussolini approved the shipment of a load of cargo aeroplanes and other supplies that would be later used to transport the Nationalist troops stationed in Africa to the Nationalist-controlled city of Seville on July 29.

On August 1, 1936 the French government forwarded a proposal to the international community for the adoption of a "Non-Intervention Agreement in Spain". The British government stated its support for the proposal on August 7. The Soviet Union, Portugal, Italy, and Germany also initially subscribed to the agreement, participating in the Non-Intervention Committee, established on September 9. However, the latter three nations maintained their material and logistical support to the Nationalist side. The Republican government also managed to acquire supplies from Mexico and the black market.

During the months of August and September 1936 Nationalist forces gained important military victories, consolidating the Portuguese border after the Battle of Badajoz on August 14 and closing the Basque-French border after taking control of Irun on September 14. These advances coincided with the progressive shift in Soviet policy towards active intervention. The Soviet Union moved to establish diplomatic relations with the Spanish Republic, and appointed its first ambassador to Spain, Marcel Rosenberg (former Soviet representative to the League of Nations), on August 21.

Towards the end of September 1936, communist parties of different countries received instructions from the Comintern and from Moscow for the recruitment and organization of the International Brigades, which would enter active combat during the month of November. Meanwhile, the successful conclusion of the Siege of the Alcázar on September 27 in favour of the Nationalist side allowed the forces of General José Enrique Varela to concentrate their efforts on the Siege of Madrid.

Throughout the month of October 1936, the Soviet Union shipped material aid to the new Popular Front Republican government led by Prime Minister Francisco Largo Caballero, which included two communist ministers. These actions were then defended by the Soviet ambassador to the United Kingdom, Ivan Maisky, before the Non-Intervention Committee on October 23, by denouncing the aid previously sent by Italy and Germany to Nationalist forces, which also constituted a violation of the Non-Intervention Agreement.

=== Status of the gold reserves and the Bank ===
In May 1936, shortly before the start of the Civil War, the Spanish gold reserves had been recorded as being the fourth largest in the world. They had been accumulated primarily during World War I, in which Spain had remained neutral. It is known, thanks to the records and historical documentation of the Bank of Spain, that the reserves in question were, since 1931, located mainly in the central headquarters of the Bank of Spain in Madrid, though some parts were located in various provincial delegations of the Bank of Spain and other minor deposits in Paris. The reserves consisted mostly of Spanish and foreign coins; the fraction of antique gold was less than 0.01% of the total reserves. The amount of gold bullion was insignificant, as the reserves included only 64 ingots.

The value of the reserves was known at the time by various official publications. The New York Times reported on August 7, 1936, that the Spanish gold reserves in Madrid were worth 718 million U.S. dollars (equivalent to $16.66 billion in 2025). Such figures corresponded to 635 tonnes (20,400,000 ozt) of fine gold, or 20.42 million troy ounces. According to the statistics of the Bank of Spain as published in the official Spanish government newspaper on July 1, the existent gold reserves on June 30, 1936, three weeks before the start of the conflict, reached a value of 5,240 million Spanish pesetas. Viñas calculated that the US$718 million of 1936 were equivalent, adjusted for inflation indexes, to US$9,725 million in 2005. In comparison, the Spanish gold reserves available in September of the same year were worth US$7,509 million.

In 1782, the Bank of Spain was established as a joint stock company (as its French and English counterparts) with a capital of 177 million Spanish pesetas, which was distributed among 354,000 nominative shares of 500 pesetas each. Despite not being a state-owned bank, the institution was subject to the control of both the government, which had the power to appoint the Bank's governor, and the Ministry of Finance, which appointed various members of the Bank's General Council.

The Law of Banking Ordination (Spanish: Ley de Ordenación Bancaria) of December 29, 1921, alternatively called Cambó Law (Spanish: Ley Cambó, named after Minister of Finance Francesc Cambó), attempted for the first time to organize the relations within the Bank of Spain as a central bank and as a private bank. The law also regulated the conditions under which the gold reserves could be mobilized by the Bank, which required the preceptive approval of the Council of Ministers. The Cambó Law stipulated that the Government had the power to approach the entity and solicit the selling of the Bank's gold reserves exclusively to influence the exchange rate of the Spanish peseta and to "exercise an interventionist action in the international exchange and in the regularity of the monetary market", in which case the Bank of Spain would participate in such action with a quantity of gold equal to that dictated by the Treasury.

Historians have questioned the legality of the gold's movement. While authors such as Pío Moa considered that the transfer of gold from the Bank of Spain clearly violated the Law, in the view of Ángel Viñas the implementation of the Cambó Law was strictly followed, based on the testimonies of the last pre-1931 Minister of Finance, Juan Ventosa y Calvell, who before the outbreak of the Civil War judged the application of the current law to be too orthodox, and viewed it as limiting the possibilities of economic growth of the country. According to Viñas, the exceptional situation created by the Civil War caused the change in attitude by the Government with respect to the Cambó Law, which moved on to exercise the necessary measures to carry out a "partial undercover nationalization" of the Bank of Spain.

The intentions of the Republican Government to place in the Bank's management individuals loyal to the Republic were solidified through the Decree of August 4, 1936, which removed Pedro Pan Gómez from the office of First Deputy Governor in favour of Julio Carabias, a move which 10 days later was followed by the removal from office of various council members and high executives. After the transfer of gold to the Soviet Union on November 21, the modification of the General Council was decreed. The Council underwent new modifications until December 24, 1937, when nine council members were substituted for institutional representatives.

== Paris gold ==
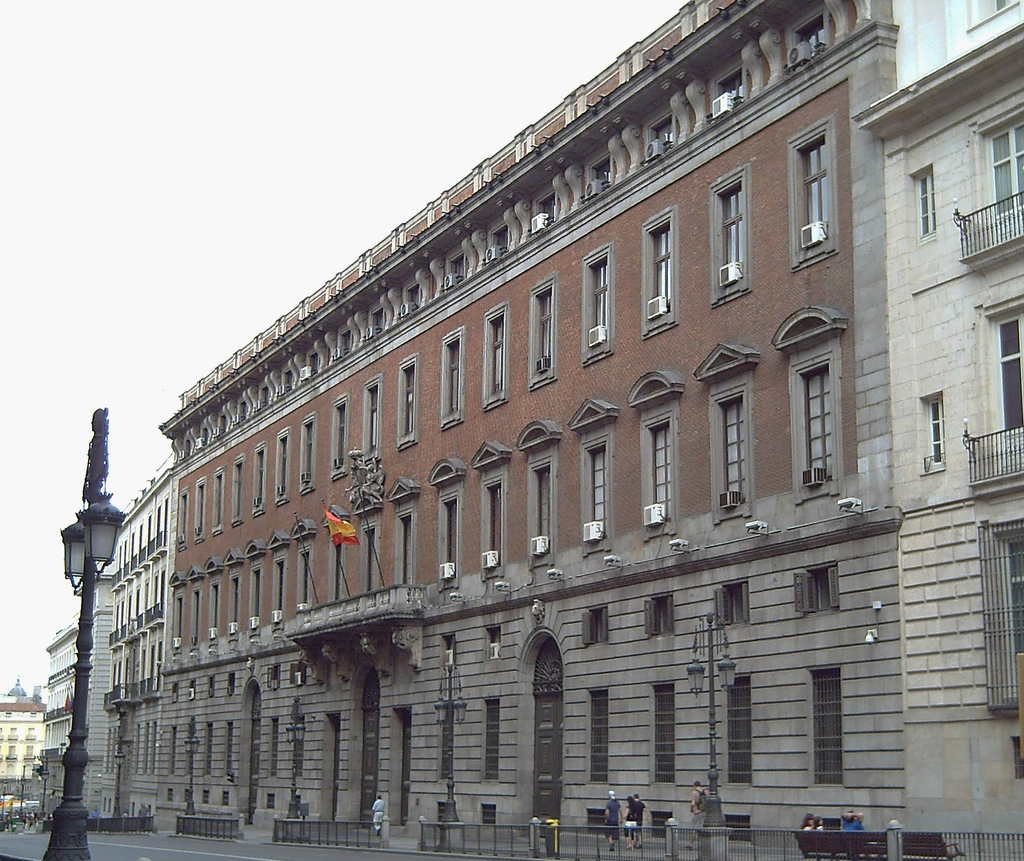
Royal Customs House (Spanish: Real Casa de la Aduana), Madrid, central headquarters of the Ministry of Finance

With the beginning of the Civil War, the Nationalists began to organize their own government machinery, considering those institutions that remained under the control of the Republican government in Madrid as illegitimate and illegal. As such, a parallel central bank, headquartered in Burgos, was formed. Both Republican and Nationalist banks claimed to be the legitimate Bank of Spain, both domestically and internationally. The central headquarters of the Bank of Spain in Madrid, and thus its gold reserves, as well as its most important provincial delegations, were kept under the control of the Republican government, while the Nationalists gained control of the provincial delegations within their territory, including Burgos.

On July 26, the newly formed Government of Prime Minister José Giral announced the sending of part of the gold reserves to France. Nationalist authorities, informed by their contacts in France and in Republican territory of the Republican government's intentions, affirmed that such usage of the gold was in violation of the aforementioned Cambó Law, and therefore considered such actions illegal. Nationalist authorities emitted a decree on August 25 declaring the credit operations of the Republican government null and void:

Decree number 164:
The present Junta, in the interests of moral order, underlines, once again, the scandal that the exit of the gold from the Bank of Spain has caused in the universal conscience, decreed by the badly-called Government of Madrid. But the issue principally to point out is the consequences of this operation in judicial terms, as they have been undertaken openly in violation of the fundamental precepts of the currently in force Ley de Ordenación Bancaria, it is evident that they lead by their manifest illegality of the inexcusable conclusion of their nullity, which is to reach in its civil effects as many persons, national or foreign, that have participated in them, with independence to their criminal responsibility, already regulated in a separate Decree. And it is logically complementary that this declaration, the prevention of the damages that may be caused, with measures of caution, which are to be adopted with urgency as is demanded by the defence of the national interests.
In its virtue, as President of the Junta de Defensa Nacional, and in accordance with it, I come to decree the following:
Article the first. All operations financed with the guarantee of the gold extracted from the Bank of Spain, from the 18th of last July, are declared to be null, and further on any and all actions that correspond by Right will be undertaken for the rescue of the aforementioned gold, regardless of the location where it may be found.
Article the second. Without prejudice to the criminal responsibility defined in the Decree number 36, the values, credits, rights and goods of all kinds that national or foreign persons or entities possess in Spain that have intervened or will intervene directly or indirectly in the operations mentioned in the preceding article, will be immediately retained, in order to assure the responsibilities of any kind that may be derived from such actions.
Burgos, 25th of August 1936.

— Miguel Cabanellas, President of the National Defense Junta

Vincent Auriol, French Minister of Finance, and Émile Labeyrie, Governor of the Bank of France, agreed to allow these operations to continue, both because of their antifascist convictions and to strengthen France's own gold reserves and promote the stability of the French franc. The creation of the Non-Intervention Committee did not obstruct the sending of gold to France, and the government of Prime Minister Largo Caballero, formed in September of the same year, continued the former Government's policy. French and British governments disregarded the complaints of Nationalist authorities about the allegedly unlawful use of the gold.

By March 1937, 174 tonnes (5,600,000 ozt) of fine gold (193 tonnes of crude gold) had been sent to the Bank of France, an amount equivalent to 27.4% of the total Spanish reserves. In exchange, the Republican Ministry of Finance received 3,922 million francs (approximately US$196 million), which were used to purchase military materials and provisions. It is known that additional gold, silver and jewellery were smuggled into French territory. These transactions were justified by the Republican government on August 30, in view of the gravity of the situation following the military insurrection, in order to "be able to respond in the extent and intensity necessary to crush the despicable rebellion".

During the last year of the Civil War, 40.2 tonnes (1,290,000 ozt) of gold deposited in Mont-de-Marsan were judicially retained, and finally handed over to the Francoist government at the conclusion of the war. This became the only successful claim on the Bank of Spain's gold reserves.

== From Madrid to Moscow ==
=== The transfer order and its motivations ===
On September 13, 1936, the confidential decree from the Ministry of Finance which authorized the transportation of the gold reserves of the Bank of Spain was signed, on the initiative of Minister of Finance of the time, Juan Negrín. The decree also called for the Government to eventually answer for their actions to the Cortes Generales (Spain's legislative body), a clause that was never fulfilled:

By His Excellence the President of the Republic, on the 13th of this present month, the following confidential decree has been signed: The abnormal situation created within the country by the military insurrection compels the government to adopt these precautionary measures considered necessary to safeguard the metallic reserves of the Bank of Spain, basis of the public credit. The nature of the measure itself and the reasons behind its adoption demand that this agreement be kept confidential. Based on the aforementioned considerations, in agreement with the Council of Ministers, and on the proposal of the Ministry of Finance, I hereby ordain, in confidentiality, the following:

- Article I: The Ministry of Finance is hereby authorized to mandate, when considered necessary, the transportation, with the highest guarantees, and to the location esteemed to be the safest, of the gold, silver, and bills present at the time at the central headquarters of the Bank of Spain.
- Article II: The Government will, when appropriate, answer to the Cortes Generales for the present decree.
  Madrid, 13th of September, 1936.

— Juan Negrín, Minister of Finance

The decree was also signed by the President of the Republic of the time, Manuel Azaña, who would later affirm that the final destination of the reserves was unknown to him. According to Largo Caballero, Azaña was informed afterwards about this decision due to his emotional state and his reserved character towards the operation:

Did this decision need to be known by a large number of people? No. An indiscretion would be the stone of an international scandal [...] It was decided that the President of the Republic should not know about it, who was at the time in a truly pitiful spiritual state; thus, the decision was only known by the President of the Council of Ministers (Largo Caballero himself), the Minister of Finance (Negrín), and the Minister of the Navy and the Airforce (Indalecio Prieto). But it were the first two the only ones who negotiated with the Russian government.

— Francisco Largo Caballero

Many authors, such as Viñas, have pointed out that the decision to transfer the gold reserves outside of Madrid was motivated by the rapid advance of the Army of Africa (commanded by Nationalist General Francisco Franco) which, since its landing on the Spanish mainland, had incessantly marched forward towards the capital. At the time the decision was taken, the Army of Africa was stationed only 116 kilometres from Madrid, and the efforts made up to that point to halt its advance had not been even partially successful. However, Nationalist forces would not arrive at Madrid until two months later; not because of Republican resistance, but because of Francisco Franco, who decided to deviate his course to aid Nationalist sympathizers in the Siege of Toledo in a highly prestigious operation that consolidated Franco's political position and allowed him to be named Head of State by the Nationalist side on September 29, 1936. Madrid withstood the Nationalist offensive until the end of the war, and the Republican government did not relocate to Valencia until November 6.

One of the main protagonists in these events, Prime Minister Largo Caballero, argued that the transfer of the gold reserves was necessary because of the Non-Intervention Pact and the defection of democratic states previously favourable towards the Republic, which left Madrid under threat from the Nationalist forces.

Since the fascists were at the gates of the capital of Spain, [Minister of Finance Negrín] asked the Council of Ministers for authorization to relocate the gold reserves of the Bank of Spain outside of the country, in order to take them to a safe place, without specifying where. [...] As a first measure, he transported them to the forts of Cartagena. After, fearing a Nationalist disembarkation, he decided to transfer them outside of Spain. [...] There was no other place but Russia, a country that aided us with arms and provisions. And so, to Russia they were delivered.

— Francisco Largo Caballero

However, Luis Araquistáin, member of the same political party as Largo Caballero, attributed the events to Soviet constraint.

Since I am sure that Largo Caballero, of whom I was an intimate friend, was not in such a state of hopelessness with regard to the final outcome of the war, and it is hard for me to believe that Negrín also fell victim to such discouragement, I find no other alternative but to return to the hypothesis of Soviet coercion, or to simply declare that the transfer of the gold to Russia was a completely inexplicable madness.

— Luis Araquistáin

The intentions of the Federación Anarquista Ibérica (FAI, Iberian Anarchist Federation) of assaulting the vaults of the Bank of Spain to transfer the gold reserves to Barcelona, the main bastion of the FAI, were also discussed. The anarchists intended not only to protect the gold reserves, but to buy war supplies on their own account. This plan would have been prepared by Diego Abad de Santillán, one of the most fervent adversaries of Negrín; however, this is considered inaccurate by the libertarian historian Francisco Olaya Morales, who argues that the gold reserves were transferred to Cartagena not for security purposes, but because of a preconceived intention to send the gold to Moscow.

While the majority of historians consider Minister of Finance Negrín the primary actor of the transfer (either by his own initiative or by the manipulation of the Soviets, depending on different interpretations), it is not clear who first had the idea of sending the reserves outside of Spain. The British historian Antony Beevor cites versions that attribute to the Soviet agent Arthur Stashevski the suggestion to Negrín of establishing a "gold account" in Moscow, due to the threat posed on Madrid by Nationalist forces and the need to purchase matériel and raw materials. Beevor also cites Gabriel Jackson and Víctor Alba, who in their book Juan Negrín, attribute the idea to Negrín himself, arguing that the idea took the Soviets by surprise and that Negrín had to carefully explain his plan to the Soviet ambassador. His friend, Mariano Ansó, defended him by affirming that he "could not have been and was not the author of the transfer of Spanish gold to Russia; at most, he was a cooperative of minor importance of the Spanish Lenin [Largo Caballero] and his counsellors, at the head of which was Luis Araquistáin." According to Martín Aceña, it was Stashevski who proposed the deposit of the gold reserves in Moscow. Walter Krivitsky, a Soviet agent responsible for military intelligence in Western Europe at the time, who later fled to the United States, stated that when Stalin decided to intervene in Spain, he wanted to ensure that there was enough gold so as to pay for the Soviet Union's aid to the Republic.

In any case, it was not until the following day, September 14, that the Council of the Bank of Spain (very reduced after the start of the war) was informed of the Government's decision to appropriate the gold and transfer it. Given that the transfer of the gold had commenced hours before the beginning of the session, the Council was unable to prevent such a decision. Nevertheless, the only two stockholder representatives of the Bank of Spain that had not allied themselves with the Nationalists (José Álvarez Guerra and Lorenzo Martínez Fresneda), submitted their resignation. Martínez Fresneda protested, arguing that the transfer was illegal, since the gold was of the exclusive property of the Bank of Spain, and thus neither the State nor the Government could take hold of it; he also pointed out that the gold guaranteed by law the convertibility of Bank notes, and should therefore remain in the security vaults of the Bank:

Mid-September of 1937, according to the personal and direct information of Mr. Martínez Fresneda to the Chief Counsellor, on the 14th, an extraordinary and secret meeting of the Council was called for the following day, the 15th. On that day Fresneda was told by the Governor that the Government had made arrangements, before the advance of the rebel troops, to take hold of all the gold of the Bank, to transport it to a place and locality where it could be safeguarded with greater security than provided by Madrid, towards which the aforementioned troops were heading with the intention of capturing, and that in effect the transport has already begun. Then Mr. Martínez Fresneda said that, since the execution of the Government agreement was already under way, there was no place to discuss the possibility of contesting and impeding its realization, but if there was no place for discussion, there was place to express, in his most solemn fashion, his energetic opposition, because he considered the agreement to be illegal and ineffective by right. It was illegal, because being the gold exclusive property of the Bank, neither the State nor the Government could take hold of it. On another account, he said, the gold is the reserve that is backed by the law and that guarantees the convertibility of currency notes, and this being so, the gold could not be kept anywhere else but in the vault of the Bank, precisely when the new vault has been inaugurated, which responds to all the advancements in security against fires, bombs, etc., all that demonstrates the unfortunateness of the agreement. He concluded re-declaring his opposition to the measure, and to such an opinion Mr. Álvarez Guerra (Chief Counsellor) also subscribed. He added that it was the logical consequence of his opposition that be presented his resignation to the Council.

— Extract of the report in voce, pronounced before the General Council of the Bank of Spain of Burgos, 22 September 1937

=== Transport of the gold to Cartagena ===
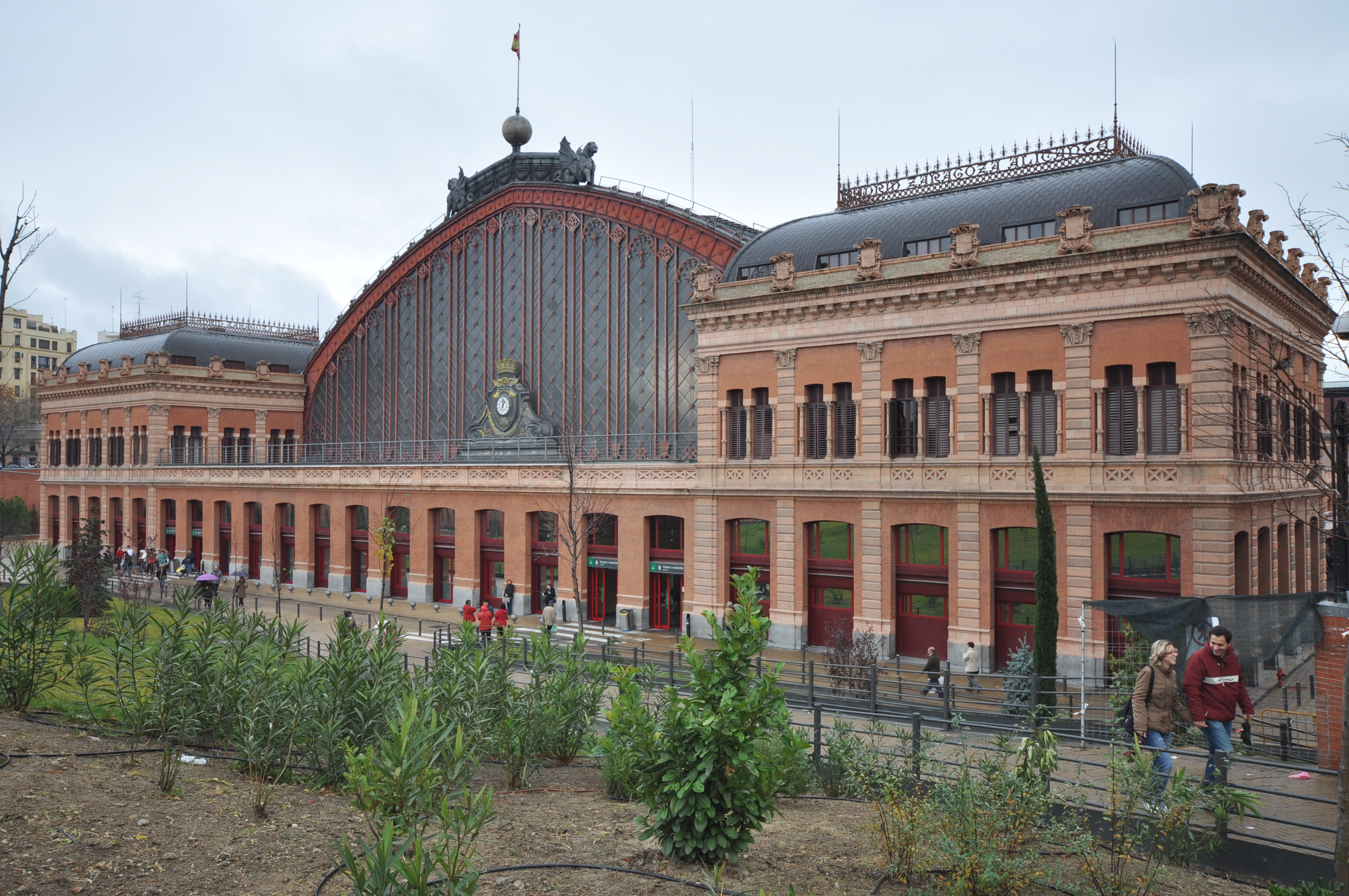
View of the Atocha railway station of Madrid.

Less than 24 hours after the signing of the decree, on the morning of September 14, 1936, members of the Spanish Carabineers and various militiamen, sent by the Ministry of Finance, walked into the Bank of Spain. The appropriation operation was led by the Treasury Director-General and future Minister of Finance under the government of Juan Negrín, Francisco Méndez Aspe. He was accompanied by Captain Julio López Masegosa and 50 or 60 metallurgists and locksmiths.

The vaults where the reserves were kept were opened, and over numerous days government agents extracted all the gold that was deposited there. The gold was placed in wooden boxes, and transported in trucks to the Atocha railway station, from there it was then transported to Cartagena. The city of Cartagena was chosen because, in the words of historian Angel Viñas, "it was an important naval station, adequately supplied and defended, somewhat distanced from the theatre of military operations and from which the possibility of transporting the reserves through a maritime route somewhere else was available."

The gold was heavily escorted and was transported via railway, according to witnesses of the events. A few days after the extraction of the gold from the Bank of Spain, Bank functionaries retrieved the Bank's silver, valued at a total of 656,708,702.59 Spanish pesetas of the time, which was later sold to the United States and France between June 1938 and July 1939 for a sum slightly more than 20 million U.S. dollars of the time (a portion of the silver was confiscated by French authorities).

With the gold reserves stored hundreds of kilometres away from the fighting fronts, it seemed that the mandate of the confidential decree of September 13 had been fulfilled. The Nationalists, when informed of the movement of the gold, protested against the events. However, on October 15, Negrín and Largo Caballero decided to transfer the gold from Cartagena to Russia.

On October 20, the director of the NKVD in Spain, Alexander Orlov, received a ciphered telegram from Stalin, ordering him to organize the shipment of the gold to the USSR, and he agreed on the preparations with Negrín. Orlov responded that he would carry out the operation with the Soviet tankmen that had just arrived in Spain. In his later statement to a United States Senate Subcommittee, he declared the following:

I wish to note that, at that time, the Spanish government (...) did not fully control the situation. I truthfully told the Minister of Finance Negrín that if anyone were to find out about it, if the anarchists intercepted my men, Russians, with their trucks full with Spanish gold, they would kill them and it would be an enormous worldwide political scandal, that could even provoke an internal revolution. Considering this (...) I asked him if the Spanish government could offer me credentials under a fictitious name (...) as a representative of the Bank of England or the Bank of America, because then (...) I could say that the gold was being transported to America for security reasons (...) Negrín did not object. He thought it was a good idea. I could speak relatively good English and could pass by as a foreigner. Thus, he gave me the credentials of a man named Blackstone and I became the representative of the Bank of America.

— United States Congress, Senate, Scope of Soviet Activity, p. 3431–32.

On October 22, 1936, Francisco Méndez Aspe, Director-General of the Treasury and Negrín's "right hand" man, came to Cartagena and ordered the nocturnal extraction of the majority of gold-containing boxes, of an approximate weight of seventy-five kilograms each, which were transported in trucks and loaded onto the vessels Kine, Kursk, Neva and Volgoles. According to Orlov:

A brigade of soviet tanks had disembarked in Cartagena two weeks before and was now stationed in Archena, 40 miles away. It was commanded by Colonel S. Krovoshein, who the Spanish knew as Melé. Krovoshein assigned me twenty military trucks and a few other of his best tankers (...) The sixty Spanish sailors had been sent to the gunpowder depository about an hour or two before in anticipation (...) And thus, on October 22, by nightfall, I went, followed by a caravan of trucks, towards the munitions depository (...) The health of Ménez Aspe was a very serious issue. He was a very nervous man. He told us that we should half the loading or we would perish [because of a German bombardment]. I responded that we could not do so, because the Germans would continue to bombard the port and the ship would sink, and so we must continue. Then he fled and left behind only his assistant, a very pleasant Spaniard who took the responsibility for counting the boxes of gold.

— United States Congress, Senate, Scope of Soviet Activity, p. 3431–32.

The gold took three nights to be loaded, and on October 25 the four vessels set out en route to Odessa, a Soviet port in the Black Sea. Four Spaniards who were charged with guarding the keys to the security vaults of the Bank of Spain accompanied the expedition. Out of the 10,000 boxes, corresponding to approximately 560 tonnes (18,000,000 ozt) of gold, only 7,800 were taken to Odessa, corresponding to 510 tonnes (16,000,000 ozt). Orlov declared that 7,900 boxes of gold were transported, while Méndez Aspe stated there were only 7,800. The final receipt showed 7,800, and it is not known whether Orlov's declaration was an error or if the 100 boxes of gold disappeared.

=== The travel and its reception in Moscow ===
The convoy set sail for the USSR, arriving at the port of Odessa on November 2 — the Kursk, however, would arrive several days later because of technical problems. One of Walter Krivitsky's collaborators, General of the State Political Directorate, described the scene at the Soviet port as follows:

The area around the dike was cleared and surrounded by Soviet troops. Through this empty space between the wharf and the railway tracks, the highest chiefs of the OGPU transported the boxes of gold on their backs. Throughout numerous days they were transporting the gold, loading it on the trucks and taking it to Moscow in armed convoys. He tried to give me an idea of the amount of gold that they had unloaded in Odessa while we were walking down the Red Square. He pointed out the area that surrounded us and said "if all the boxes of gold that we piled up on the wharfs of Odessa were to be placed here side by side, they would completely cover up the Red Square."

— Walter Krivitsky, In Stalin's Secret Service, pp. 112–3.

The gold, protected by the 173rd regiment of the NKVD, was immediately moved to the State Depository for Valuables (Goskhran), in Moscow, where it was received as a deposit according to a protocol, dated November 5, by which a reception commission was established. The gold arrived at the Soviet capital a day before the 19th anniversary of the October Revolution. According to Orlov, Joseph Stalin celebrated the arrival of the gold with a banquet attended by members of the politburo, in which he was famously quoted as saying, "The Spaniards will never see their gold again, just as they don't see their ears," an expression based on a Russian proverb.

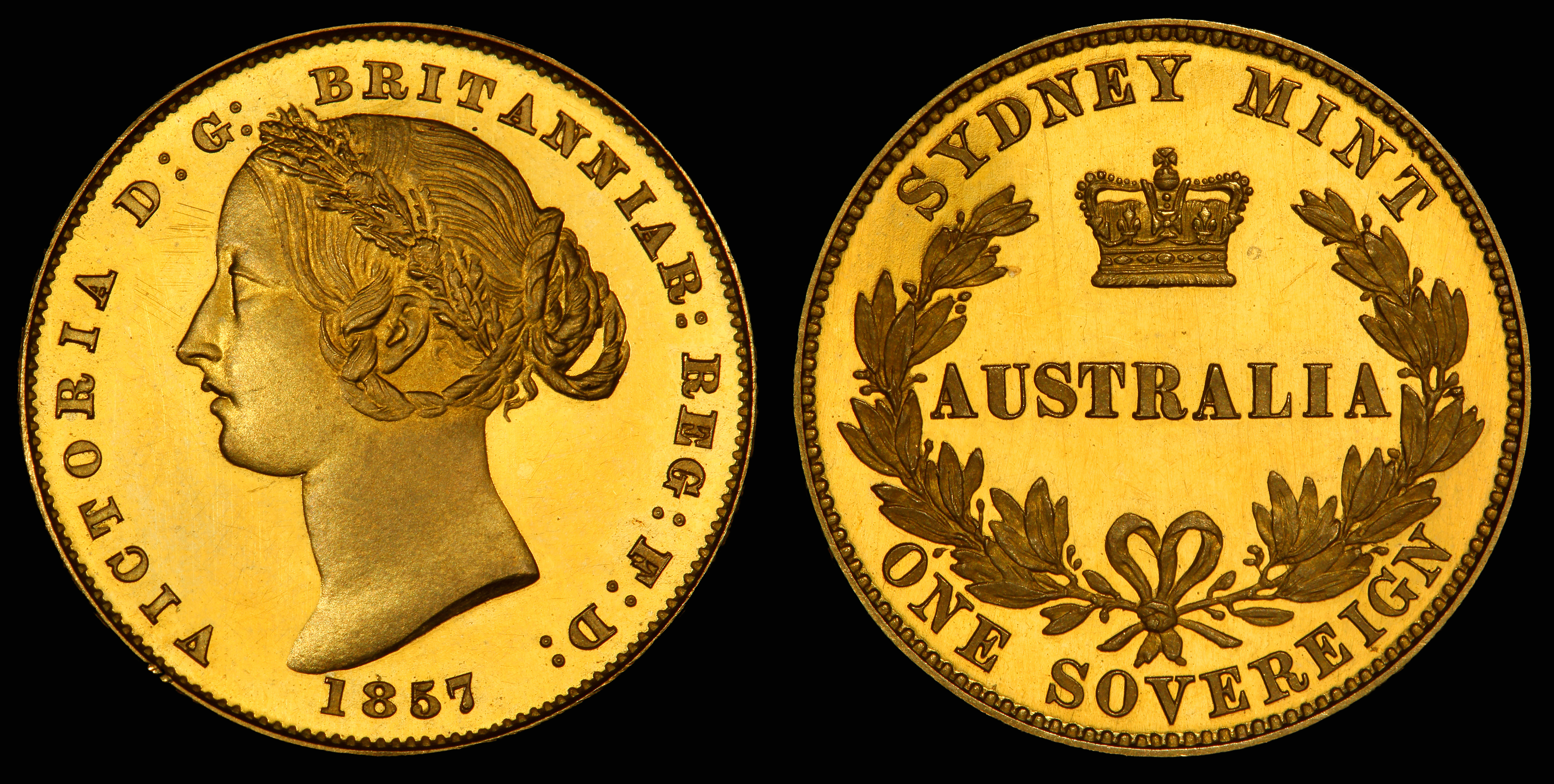
Coins made up 99.8% of Bank of Spain transferred gold, 70% of which were sovereigns (pictured) and half-sovereigns.

The gold was stored in the Goskhran under military vigilance, and the remaining boxes of gold carried by the Kursk arrived between November 9 and 10. Shortly after, a recount on the total deposits was carried out; initial estimates suggested that the recount would take a year to complete, and despite it having been done with the utmost care, the recount was finalized in less than two months, having begun on December 5, 1936, and completed on January 24, 1937. 15,571 sacks of gold were opened, and 16 different types of gold coins were found inside: pounds sterling (sovereigns or half sovereigns) (70% of the total), Spanish pesetas, French francs, Louis, German marks, Belgian francs, Italian lire, Portuguese escudos, Russian rubles, Austrian schillings, Dutch guilders, Swiss francs, Mexican pesos, Argentine pesos, Chilean pesos, and an extraordinary amount of U.S. dollars. The total deposit was constituted of 509,287.183 kilograms of gold coins and 792.346 kilograms of gold in the form of ingots: thus, a total of 510,079,529.30 grams of crude gold, which at an average of .900 millesimal fineness, was equivalent to 460,568,245.59 grams of fine gold (approximately 14,807,363.8 troy ounces). This amount of gold was valued at 1,592,851,910 gold-pesetas (518 million U.S. dollars). Additionally, the numismatic value of the coins was much higher than the amount of gold they contained, but the Soviets disregarded this when calculating its value. The Soviets did, however, scrupulously examine all coins to identify those that were fake, defective, or did not contain enough gold. The Soviets never explained what was done with the rare or antique coins, but it is doubtful that they were melted. Burnett Bolloten suggests that it is possible that all coins with numismatic value were separated with the intention of gradually selling them on the international market.

On February 5, 1937 the Spanish ambassador and the Soviet representatives G. F. Grinko, Commissar of Finance, and N. N. Krestinsky, Commissar of Foreign Affairs, signed the final reception act on the deposit of Spanish gold, a document written in French and Russian. Paragraph 2, section 4 of the document stipulated that the Spanish government retained the right of re-exporting or utilizing the gold, and the last clause of the document indicated that the Soviet Union would not be held responsible for the utilization of the gold by Spanish authorities. Said clause established that "if the Government of the Republic ordered the exportation of the gold received as a deposit by the USSR, or utilized said gold in any other way, the responsibility assumed by the People's Commissariat of Finance would automatically be reduced, in whole or in part in proportion to the actions taken by the Government of the Spanish Republic". It was thus clear that the gold reserves deposited in Moscow could be freely employed by the Republic, exporting it or alienating it, and Soviet authorities assumed no responsibility. It is worth noting that the USSR granted the ownership of the gold to the Government of the Republic, instead of to the Bank of Spain, its legal owner.

When, on January 15, 1937, the newspaper of the CNT Solidaridad Obrera denounced the "absurd idea of sending the gold reserves abroad", the government agency Cosmos published a semi-official note (January 20), affirming that the reserves were still in Spain. Not long after, the disputes between the socialist and communist dominated Republican government and the anarchist organizations and the POUM would result in the violent clashes of May 1937, ending in an anarchist defeat.

Those involved in the events were soon removed from the scene. Stashevski and the Soviet ambassador to Spain, Rosenberg, were executed in 1937 and 1938. Orlov, fearing for his life, fled in 1938 to the United States upon receiving a telegram from Stalin. The Soviet Commissars of Finance, Grinko, Krestinsky, Margoulis and Kagan, were executed on May 15, 1938 or disappeared in varying ways, accused of being part of the anti-Soviet "Trotskyist-rightist bloc". Grinko was accused of making "efforts to undermine the financial power of the USSR." The four Spanish functionaries sent to supervise the operation were retained by Stalin until October 1938, when they were permitted to leave the Soviet Union for Stockholm, Buenos Aires, Washington and México City, respectively. The Spanish ambassador, Marcelino Pascua, was transferred to Paris.

== Use of the deposit ==
Negrín signed 19 consecutive sell orders between February 19, 1937 and April 28, 1938, directed to the successive People's Commissioner of Finance: G. F. Grinko (until May 1937), V. Tchoula (until September 1937) and A. Zverev (until the end of the war). In them, the value of an ounce of gold troy was converted into pounds sterling, U.S dollars or French francs according to the exchange rate at the London Stock Exchange. According to Martín Aceña, 415 tonnes (13,300,000 ozt) of crude gold (374 tonnes (12,000,000 ozt) of fine gold) were sold in 1937, then between January and April 1938 another 58 (52) were sold, and out of the remaining gold, 35 (31) tonnes were separated from the original deposit to constitute a second deposit that guaranteed a credit of $70 million U.S. Thus, by August 1938 a remaining 2 tonnes (64,000 ozt) were still available. The Republic obtained from the selling of the gold a total of $469.8 million U.S., 131.6 of which remained within the USSR to pay for various purchases and expenses. The Soviets kept 2.1% of the funds in the form of commissions and brokerage, and kept an additional 1.2% in the form of transport, deposit, melting, and refining expenses: in total, slightly less than 3.3%, approximately $14.5 million U.S. The remaining 72%, $338.5 million dollars' worth, was transferred to the Banque Commerciale pour L'Europe du Nord, or Eurobank, in Paris, the Soviet financial organization in France, property of Gosbank, the national bank of the Soviet Union. From Paris, agents of the Treasury and diplomatic representatives paid for the purchase of matériel acquired in Brussels, Prague, Warsaw, New York and Mexico, among others.

With the Spanish gold deposited in Moscow, the Soviets immediately demanded from the Republican government payment for the first deliveries of war supplies, which had apparently arrived as a gift to combat international fascism. Stashevski demanded from Negrín US$51 million in accumulated debt and expenses for the transport of the gold from Cartagena to Moscow. On the Nationalist side, German and Italian aid also had to be compensated; however, the Germans and Italians allowed Franco to satisfy his debt once the war came to an end. Authors such as Francisco Olaya Morales, and Ángel Viñas criticized the actions and behaviour of the Soviets.

Historians that have had access to the "Negrín dossier" believe that the Soviets did not abuse their position nor did they defraud the Spanish in their financial transactions. Nevertheless, in the words of María Ángeles Pons: "nothing did the Republicans obtain for free from their Russian friends", as all types of expenses and services had been charged to the Government of the Republic. However, authors such as Gerald Howson believe in the existence of a Soviet fraud in the management of the deposit in Moscow, claiming that Stalin intentionally inflated the price of the matériel sold to the Republic by manipulating the exchange of Russian rubles to U.S. dollars and of U.S. dollars to Spanish pesetas, raising the international exchange rates up to 30% and 40% respectively.

The increased power of the communists at the time, taking advantage of the political pressure that the Soviet Union could exert having control of the gold, is occasionally mentioned among scholars. According to José Giral, even though the payments for arms and weapons had been fulfilled, the Soviet Union would not send any supplies if the government of the Republic "did not agree to first appoint important communists to police and military positions."

Ángel Viñas reached the conclusion that the gold deposits were exhausted less than a year before the end of the Civil War, being spent entirely on payment for matériel (including the costs of the operation). However, authors such as Martín Aceña and Olaya Morales criticize Viñas's hypothetical models, which in their opinion lack the evidence to fully validate them, therefore it is impossible for the time being to affirm whether Viñas's conclusion is accurate or not. If, in fact, the gold deposits were entirely sold to the Soviet Union, the fate of all the funds generated by the selling of the gold and transferred to the Banque Commerciale de l'Europe du Nord in Paris, remains uncertain, as no documents have been found, neither Soviet nor Spanish, in reference to such operations. According to Martín Aceña, "the investigation on the gold has not been fully closed." In any case, with the gold depleted, the scarce credit of the Republican Ministry of Finance vanished.

== Monetary consequences ==
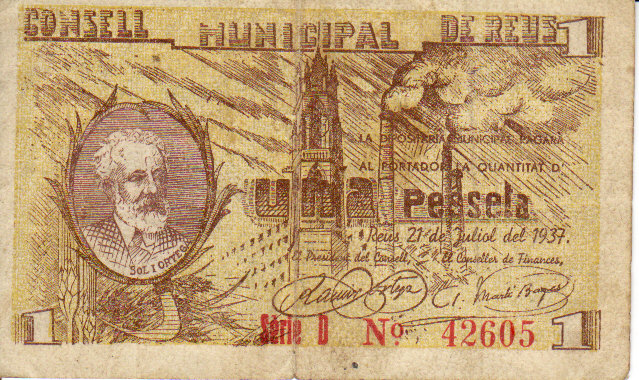
Obverse of a 1 peseta banknote, issued on the summer of 1937 by the Municipal Council of Reus.

The withdrawal of the Bank of Spain's gold reserves to Moscow has been pointed out to be one of the main causes of the Spanish monetary crisis of 1937. While the gold became in practice an excellent source of funding, its usage dealt a hard blow against the coined and printed currency of the country. Nationalist efforts to expose the exportation of the gold put the government's financial credibility in question, and caused general mistrust among the public. A decree issued by the Ministry of Finance on October 3, 1936, obliging Spaniards to yield all the gold they possessed, caused widespread alarm. Even though the government denied in January 1937 that it had deposited the gold reserves abroad (vide supra), it was forced to acknowledge that it had made various payments with such gold.

Lacking a gold reserve to back up the Republican banknotes, and already suffering from significant devaluation, the Government of the Republic began to issue increasing quantities of banknotes with no backing in gold or silver, thereby increasing the overall paper money in circulation. By April 30, 1938, the number of new banknotes in circulation in Republican-controlled areas was calculated to be 12,754 million pesetas, an increment of 265.8% with respect to the 3,486 million of July 17, 1936; by then 2,650 million were in circulation in the Nationalist-controlled territory, in contrast to the approximately 2,000 million of July 1936. These actions caused massive inflation, and led to the amassment of precious metals by the population. While prices increased by 40% in the Nationalist areas, they skyrocketed by up to 1500% in the Republican-controlled areas. Metallic coins began to disappear and were replaced by paper or cardboard circles. Transactions with Republican banknotes became undesirable, as such notes were already highly devalued, and it was further known that, if Franco were to win the War, those banknotes would lose their full value, since they were all newly-issued series placed in circulation from the start of the War (June 1936) onwards. The State was unable to effectively respond to the lack of metallic currency, causing town halls and other local institutions to print their own provisional bonds, some of which were rejected in neighbouring municipalities.

Propaganda from the Nationalist side contended that such inflation had been premeditated and artificially created.

The Republican Government blamed the ills of the economy on the free market, and proposed as its salvation the nationalization of all prices and other changes on the economy in general. A report presented to the plenary session of the Communist Party of March 1937 by José Díaz Ramos openly reflected the position of the party:

...all our energies must be focused, with full rigour, against the true enemies, against the great industrialists, against the great businessmen, against the pirates of the banking industry, who naturally, within our territory have already been for the most part liquidated, however there still remain some who must be quickly liquidated, because these are the true enemies and not the small industrialists and businessmen.

— José Díaz Ramos,

On the international scene, the perception that the Republic was experiencing revolutionary anti-capitalist movement began to arise, favoured by the testimony of Spanish businessmen, such as ex-Minister of the Monarchy and active Nationalist supporter Francesc Cambó, an individual of great influence in the financial world. Logically, upon having their interests and properties threatened, the financial world, both Spanish and international, positioned itself unequivocally in favour of the Nationalists (as exemplified by the support of Juan March, Ford and Texas Oil to the Nationalist side, or their facilities to obtain credits), thus accelerating the decline in the international value of the Republican peseta.

== Cold War ==
=== Republican division in exile ===
In the last months of the Civil War, a bitter division was formed among Republicans between those who advocated for uniting the Civil War with the imminent Second World War and those wanting to put an end to the conflict by negotiating with the Nationalists. Negrín, at the time Prime Minister and a supporter of continuing the war, had the sole support of the Spanish Communist Party (PCE); all other parties, including practicality the totality of his own, the Spanish Socialist Workers' Party (PSOE), opposed him. Indalecio Prieto had publicly separated himself from Negrín in August 1937, after his departure from the Government, where he had been Minister of Defence; in a meeting with PSOE's central committee, he violently accused Negrín of ceding to communist pressure to remove him from the government. Since the Autumn of 1938, the antagonism between communists and socialists resulted in violent clashes.

Largo Caballero's criticism of Negrín's administration:
How much gold was handed over to Russia? It couldn't have been known, because Mr. Negrín, systematically, has always refused to account for his administration. It was later known, through a number of accounts published by the Bank of Spain on 30 April 1938, that said Bank had handed over custody of 1,592,851,906 million [sic] in gold and 307,630,000 in silver. Apart from that, the Ministry of Finance seized everything in existence in the security vaults of official and private Banks, valued surely in the many millions. All this plus the jewellery present in the National Palace, in private rooms, and those of many individuals, was spent in arms? At the end of the war, what gold remained under Russian power? Have they liquidated the Government of Mr. Negrín? This cannot be known by any other but him, since [...] he always refused to give account for the economic situation. [...] Mr. Negrín, systematically, has always refused to account for his administration, [...] in fact, the State has become a false purse. Is it because of this and other things the reason why Negrín refuses to let anyone know about the economic situation? Wretched country, that sees itself governed by those that lack any sort of scruples whatsoever [...] with a senseless and criminal policy that has taken the Spanish people to the greatest disaster that has been known in the History of Spain. All the hatred and the desire to impose exemplary punishment to those responsible for such grave defeat will be little.

— Francisco Largo Caballero, March 1939.

This divide resulted in the coup d'état of Colonel Segismundo Casado in March 1939, actively supported from within the PSOE. The provisional government established thereafter expelled the communists and Negrín supporters from the Republican government, instigated the flight of Negrín from Spain and precipitated the end of the Civil War after attempting to negotiate peace with Franco, who only accepted an unconditional surrender. Accused of being a mere marionette of the communists and of having led the Republic to disaster, the issue of the "Moscow gold" was one of the arguments used against Negrín in the controversies that followed.

After the end of the war, the PSOE initiated a slow reconstruction in exile. The party formed around the ideological leadership of Indalecio Prieto from his refuge in Mexico, where party supporters of Negrín had been excluded. The exiled PSOE grouped the leaders of the three political leanings that had divided socialism during the conflict, Julián Besteiro, Indalecio Prieto and Largo Caballero, clearly aligned with an anti-communist and anti-Negrín orientation.

Among the exiled, in particular among the dissidents of the PCE, it was affirmed that since the end of the war the gold, or at least part of it, had not been converted into currency to purchase weapons for the Republic, criticizing the opacity of the Negrín administration, that retained all related documentation and refused to give account to the Government in exile. The criticisms of Francisco Largo Caballero, one of the main figures involved, were especially prominent, which, according to Ángel Viñas, constitute "one of the myths that have blackened the figure of Negrín."

In January 1955, during the high point of McCarthyism, the American magazine Time reported on the accusations of Indalecio Prieto and other exiled Republicans in Mexico towards Juan Negrín and his "complicity" with the Soviets in the "long-buried story of the gold hoard". These circumstances were used by the Francoist government, through its embassies in the United States, France and the United Kingdom, to relaunch its diplomatic conflict with the Soviet Union and expressly accuse the USSR of selling the Spanish gold in the European market, even though Time questioned the feasibility of sustaining said accusations. The Francoist government had been informed in 1938 that the reserves had been exhausted and converted into currency, but persisted in demanding the reimbursement of the gold deposit:

Spanish gold seized by the reds and taken to Russia. As of January 8 of 1955 Mr. Minister of Foreign Affairs has been addressed, by Note signed by the Diplomatic Representatives of various countries of Europe and the United States of America denouncing the seizure carried out by the reds and the payments that, according to information from authorized sources, the Russians make with the gold reserves of the Bank of Spain."

— Asuntos pendientes de recuperación en reivindicación de bienes;

=== The Negrín dossier ===
The accounting registries of the operation, known as the "Negrín dossier", have allowed researchers to reconstruct the events after the reception of the Spanish gold reserves in Moscow, when the Soviets melted the coins and transformed them into low gold alloy bars, and in return provisioned the bank accounts of the Republic's Ministry of Finance abroad.

Juan Negrín died in Paris towards the end of 1956, and his son Rómulo Negrín, following the instructions of his father, handed over the so-called "Negrín dossier" to the legal counsel of the Minister of Foreign Affairs, Antonio Melchor de las Heras, "to facilitate the exercise of the actions that may correspond to the Spanish State [...] to obtain the devolution of the cited gold to Spain", according to the testimony of the consul at Paris, Enrique Pérez Hernández. The negotiations with the Francoist government had been initiated by the ex-Minister of Justice and friend of Negrín, Mariano Ansó, by request of Negrín himself, who considered that the documents were the property of the Spanish government. A document dated from December 14, 1956, written and signed by Ansó and forwarded by Negrín's son expressed "the deep preoccupation [of Negrín] for the interests of Spain against those of the USSR" and his fear of "the defencelessness to which Spain was being reduced by being deprived of all justificatory documentation of its rights, in a forced transaction, proceeding, perhaps, from the most vast and important operation carried out by two countries." After enumerating other various issues that "weighed down the spirit of Mr. Negrín", among them the Soviet retention of "important and numerous units of the Spanish merchant fleet", according to Ansó, Negrín held that "in a subsequent account liquidation between Spain and the USSR, his duty as a Spaniard obliged him to an unconditional support of the interest of the nation."

The dossier, an incomplete series of documents related to the deposit and administration of the gold of the Bank of Spain, was sent to Alberto Martín Artajo, Minister of Foreign Affairs, and was forwarded to the Lieutenant Governor of the Bank of Spain, Jesús Rodríguez Salmones, who, without inspecting the papers, ordered them to be stored in the security vaults of the institution. Even though the transfer was made with strict discretion, as Negrín had intended for it to remain an absolute secret, the events soon came into public domain, which instigated passionate controversies. In January 1957, Franco sent a diplomatic commission to Moscow, officially to discuss the repatriation of Spaniards — however, it was suspected that the commission's actual goal was the opening of negotiations for the return of the gold, in light of the documentary evidence uncovered by the Negrín dossier.

Francoist interpretation on the Moscow Gold:
Los caminos del oro español
The Spanish government has contacted various foreign Chanceries denouncing the payments abroad that the USSR may carry out with the gold from the deposit made in Moscow by the red Government in 1936 [...] During the course of the Liberation Crusade [Spanish Civil War] these same warnings were formulated about the payments that could be done with this gold [...] It is logical that our Government repeats its protest when it is known that the USSR is effecting exports with this gold [...] Today the details of this robbery are known, as they were reported by their own protagonists. Furthermore: its motives are known and the true dimension of the wile created to justify their departure from Spain towards Odessa. The "resemblances" of sovereignty created by the red Government have been debunked a long time ago. Since the start of our war of Liberation, the red zone had been governed in effect by Soviet emissaries endowed with all the powers [...] The plunder of Spain was, in effect, a double operation, economic and political, and the form in which the resupply of the red Government was to be carried out was also a political operation destined to control the Bolshevikation of the area under the control of Largo Caballero. [...] In those boxes 1,581,642 million of gold-pesetas were taken to Russia. This figure and details concur with the testimonies by Valentín Gomez, by Jesús Hernández and by Prieto. All of them have sufficient reasons to be informed, as they were direct authors or concealers until the rivalries arisen by the distribution of the spoils pitied them against each other. [...] With this gold [...] the campaign of communist inspiration against Spain was financed, subsidized, acquiring newspapers and radio stations. The USSR, which had not sent more than old armaments in exchange for the stolen gold, spent it in the second phase of its attempt to take control of Spain from 1945 onwards [...] A curious detail remains: the tragic fate of the men that directly intervened in the plunder [...] The paths of this stolen gold have been sinister.

— Arriba newspaper, January 13, 1955.

The same documentation that Negrín had refused to give to the exiled Republican government for over 15 years was willingly handed over to the Francoist authorities. The President of the exiled Republican government, Félix Gordón Ordás, wrote on January 8, 1957:

The executorial decision of Mr. Juan Negrín has caused me stupor. Regardless of how much I inquire into the motives of it I do not find anything satisfactory. I only see two probables: a patriotic zeal or a desire for revenge. The first case it would have been a colossal mistake of appreciation, as handing money to Franco and his accomplices is like throwing water to the sea. The second case would imply such depth of ruin that it seems incompatible with the concept that I had of the illustrious disappeared. But in both supposes, the actions of doctor Negrín are treason to the cause of the Spanish people and the Republic [...] By acting in such an objectionable manner doctor Negrín proclaimed that he regarded Franco as legitimate...

— Félix Gordón Ordás

In April 1957, Time reported that the Soviet government, through Radio Moscow as well as Pravda, assured the Francoist government that the gold reserves deposited in Moscow had been used in their totality by the Republican government to "make payments abroad", and were thus "soon all gone". The Mundo Obrero newspaper published on May 15 of the same year the following article:

A few foreign newspapers are in the business of publishing articles about the Spanish gold deposited twenty years ago in the Soviet Union, without mentioning all the consumption of such gold by the Spanish Republican government, which confuses the public opinion creating the impression that there is still non-utilized leftovers of such gold. The weight and verification of the gold while being transferred to Soviet authorities was done conjunctly by Soviet and Spanish representatives. The Spanish government stipulated that it would have the faculty to pay off orders made abroad and to carry out currency transactions through the Soviet State Bank based on the gold reserves deposited in the Soviet Union.
According to the information received, the Spanish government made numerous payments for its foreign purchases and gave instructions for currency transactions, that were executed by the Bank of the Soviet Union. According to the data of the Soviet authorities, the Spanish government exhausted the gold deposited in the Soviet Union. All the orders of the Spanish Republican government were appropriately signed conjunctly by Francisco Largo Caballero, Spanish Republican Prime Minister, and Negrín, Minister of Finance. Later on, when Negrín went on to become Prime Minister, he signed as such and as Minister of Finance. The last letter from Negrín, dated April 8 of 1938, proves that the gold had been exhausted. The letter requests in the name of the Council of Ministers of the Spanish Republic, that all the Spanish gold that remains in the Soviet Union be liquidated. And so it was.
It must be mentioned that, upon requirement of the Spanish Republican government, the Soviet government gave it a credit of 85 million dollars, of which they only repaid 35. There is thus still a debt [to the Soviet government] of 50 million dollars. Negrín knew it, as he signed all his orders relative to the gold and the credits. None of the deposited gold was used for the support of the emigrants and Spanish children that sought refuge in the Soviet Union. These expenses were covered by the Soviet Union and its social institutions, in particular the labour unions.

— Mundo Obrero, May 15, 1957

The note did not include any evidence and contradicted statements issued by prominent members of the Republican government. For example, Negrín had affirmed to José Giral in 1938 that two-thirds of the gold deposited in Moscow was still available. Also, since the statements issued were not part of an official notice, the Soviet government could distance itself from what had been affirmed if it were to be deemed appropriate. Indalecio Prieto regarded the declarations of Pravda as false, enumerated the expenses of the Spanish funds in the benefit of the French Communist Party and affirmed:

The PSOE will not be able to boast of the most miserable results that concluded of their adventure, but in justice cannot, as some propaganda would wish, unload all the responsibility on the communists. A socialist minister asked for authorization to proceed freely; the Government, which was formed by another five socialists, including he who presided it, conceded to such a request, and the bank agents that handed over as much as they were asked were also socialists, in Spain as in Russia, as well as the countrymen that convoyed the load between Madrid and Cartagena.

— Indalecio Prieto

We are in the presence of a colossal embezzlement. Whatever my opinion of Juan Negrín were, I declare him incapable of the terrible joke of arranging that after his death -if he so arranged it- a document that nothing positive represented should be handed over to Franco [...] although all these expenses were done based on the gold deposited in Russia, its complete exhaustion is impossible. I repeat that this is an extraordinary defalcation. In order to exculpate themselves, Russia would have falsified as many justificatory documents as needed, in the same way as they falsified so many to justify their monstrous processes against the enemies of Bolshevism and against more or less dissident Bolshevists. Negrín, from his tomb, will not be able to deny the authenticity of his signatures, traced by expect fabricators.

— Indalecio Prieto

Another controversy raised in this regard is the justification of a transfer to Mexico of assets seized by the General Reparations Fund at the end of the war, which included, among other things, "Bank of Spain deposits and gold bars". According to socialist Amaro del Rosal, sole president of the Reparations Fund and main source on the matter, reproduced in a detailed inventory. It would be the well-known "Vita Treasure", a vessel acquired by the Republic for this purpose.

== Historiography and myth ==
Pablo Martín Aceña, Francisco Olaya Morales and Ángel Viñas have been among the most distinguished researchers on the topic, the last one being the first to gain access to the documentation of the Bank of Spain. At an international level, Gerald Howson and Daniel Kowalsky have had direct access to the documents of the archives of the Soviet Union opened to researchers during the 1990s, focusing their investigations on the relations between the Soviet Union and the Spanish Republic, and the deliveries of military material.

Even though the decision to use the gold reserves has not given rise to much debate or interest among historians, its final destination continues to be a motive for controversy. Authors like Viñas, Ricardo Miralles or Enrique Moradiellos defend Negrín, both as head of the Ministry of Finance and as Prime Minister (Viñas considers him "the great Republican statesman during the Civil War") and view that the sending of the gold to the USSR had a political, economic and operative rationale accepted by the Republican government. It was, according to the aforementioned, the only viable option faced with the Nationalist advance and the non-intervention of the Western democracies, making the survival of the Republic possible in an adverse international context. For these authors, without the selling of the reserves, there would not have been the slightest possibility of military resistance. On the other hand, Martín Aceña viewed the sending of the gold as a mistake that cost the Republic its financial capability: the USSR was a distant country, of opaque bureaucracy and financial functioning foreign to international norms and guarantees, in such respect that it would have been logical to send the gold to capitalistic countries such as France or the United States. With respect to Olaya Morales, exiled anarchist during the Francoist regime, in all of his works he described the administration of Negrín as criminal and denies the arguments and theories of Ángel Viñas, considering the "gold issue" a gigantic fraud and one of the most important factors in the Republican defeat.

Authors like Fernando García de Cortázar, Pío Moa or Alberto Reig Tapia have defined the Spanish episode of the Moscow Gold as mythical, used to justify the disastrous situation of post-war Spain.

== See also ==
- Flight of the Norwegian National Treasury
- Foreign involvement in the Spanish Civil War
- Francoist Spain
- Nazi gold
- Operation Fish
- Romanian Treasure, the Romanian gold reserves sent (alongside other valuable objects) to Russia for safekeeping during World War I, but never returned.
- Yamashita's gold
