= Juan Negrín =

Prime Minister of Spain from 1937 to 1939

The Most Excellent Juan Negrín
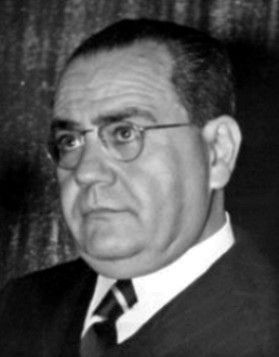
- Negrín in 1938

Prime Minister of Spain
- In office 17 May 1937 – 31 March 1939
- President: Manuel Azaña
- Preceded by: Francisco Largo Caballero
- Succeeded by: Francisco Franco

Minister of National Defence
- In office 5 April 1938 – 31 March 1939
- Prime Minister: Himself
- Preceded by: Indalecio Prieto
- Succeeded by: Fidel Dávila Arrondo

Minister of the Treasury
- In office 4 September 1936 – 5 April 1938
- Prime Minister: Francisco Largo Caballero; Himself
- Preceded by: Enrique Ramos Ramos
- Succeeded by: Francisco Méndez Aspe

Member of the Congress of Deputies
- In office 16 March 1936 – 31 March 1939
- Constituency: Las Palmas
- In office 8 December 1933 – 7 January 1936
- Constituency: Madrid
- In office 14 July 1931 – 9 October 1933
- Constituency: Las Palmas

Personal details
- Born: Juan Negrín López; 3 February 1892 Las Palmas, Spain
- Died: 12 November 1956 (aged 64) Paris, France
- Party: Spanish Socialist Workers' Party (1929–1946)
- Spouse: María Fidelman Brodsky

Juan Negrín López (Spanish: [xwan neˈɣɾin]; 3 February 1892 – 12 November 1956) was a Spanish physician and politician who served as prime minister of the Second Spanish Republic. He was a leader of the Spanish Socialist Workers' Party and of the left-leaning Popular Front government during the Spanish Civil War. He also served as minister of finance and minister of defence. He was the last Republican prime minister of Spain (1937–1939), leading the government forces defeated by the Nationalists under General Francisco Franco. He went into exile in Paris, France, where he served as prime minister of the Spanish Republican government in exile until 1945, when he was replaced by José Giral. He died in exile on 12 November 1956.

None of the leaders of the Second Spanish Republic has been as vilified as Negrín, not only by Francoist historians but also by important sectors of the exiled Spanish Left. After the end of the civil war there was no person more hated than Negrín. The leaders of his own Socialist Party were among his detractors, including his friend and fellow socialist leader Indalecio Prieto. He has been depicted as primarily responsible for losing the civil war, ruling with a dictatorial style, yielding to Communist influence, and giving Spain's gold reserves to the Soviet Union.

Subsequent scholarship has painted a more nuanced picture that clears Negrín of most of these allegations. This work portrays Negrin as mainly a pragmatic, social democratic leader who had no other choice to ally with the Soviets, due to the non-commitment of Great Britain and France to support the democratically elected government against the aggression of Nazi Germany and Fascist Italy. Under the banner "Resistir es vencer" (transl. "To resist is to win"), he tried to keep the Republican cause alive until the outbreak of a world war, which would have granted Republican Spain more allies in Western Europe. The PSOE expelled Negrín in 1946, but he was posthumously rehabilitated in 2008.

== Early years ==
Born in Las Palmas on the Canary Islands, Negrín came from a deeply Catholic middle-class family. His father, Juan Negrin Cabrera, was a prosperous and reputable merchant and businessman of the islands, married to María Dolores López Marrero. Juan was the firstborn son and had one brother Heriberto, who adhered to the Claretian order, and a sister Dolores. Since Juan had excelled in science subjects and had shown an interest in medicine, his father decided to send him, at the age of 15, to study in Germany in 1906, attracted by the enormous prestige of German universities at the time.

=== In Germany ===
Negrin studied for two years at the Medical Faculty of Kiel. In 1908, to specialize in medical physiology, he moved to Leipzig, to the best physiology institute of Germany and even in Europe. He stayed in Germany for almost a decade, studying first medicine, then chemistry and to some extent, economics. He proved to be a brilliant student with extraordinary capacity for scientific research. In 1912 (when he was only twenty years old) under the guidance of Theodor von Brücke he obtained a doctorate in medicine and was immediately incorporated into the Institute of Physiology in Leipzig as a research assistant and then as an assistant professor.

On 21 July 1914 he married María Fidelman Brodsky, a piano student and daughter of a wealthy family of Russian exiles living in the Netherlands. The couple had five children, three of whom survived: Juan, Rómulo, and Miguel. Negrín spoke English, French, German, and Russian, in addition to his native Spanish.

=== Back to Spain ===
At the end of 1915, in the middle of the First World War, the increasing difficulties he encountered working in Germany prompted Negrin to return to Spain. He already had professional prestige due to his research on the adrenal glands and the central nervous system and by a series of articles published in scientific journals in Europe. He was a pupil of Santiago Ramón y Cajal, who won the Nobel Prize of Medicine. In 1919 he obtained his medical degree in Spain, and in 1922, aged 29, he became a professor of physiology at the Physiology Department at the Complutense University of Madrid Medical School. His physiology laboratory in Madrid became an internationally renowned research centre and a school of scientific training. Among the many students he inspired was Severo Ochoa, winner of the 1959 Nobel Prize in Physiology or Medicine:

Negrin opened wide, fascinating vistas to my imagination, not only through his lectures and laboratory teaching, but through his advice, encouragement, and stimulation to read scientific monographs and textbooks in languages other than Spanish.

According to Ochoa, Negrín was a demanding tutor and a high proportion of students failed his exams. He also set up a private laboratory that was very successful. In 1923, his youngest daughter died in childbirth, which Negrín himself attended. Two years later, his other daughter died at the age of ten as a result of a typhus epidemic. These misfortunes would lead to the estrangement of the marriage and the entry into Negrín's life of Feliciana López de Dom Pablo, one of his laboratory assistants, who would become his companion in 1926 until his death. His wife did not tolerate this relationship and attributed permanent affairs to him.

=== In politics ===
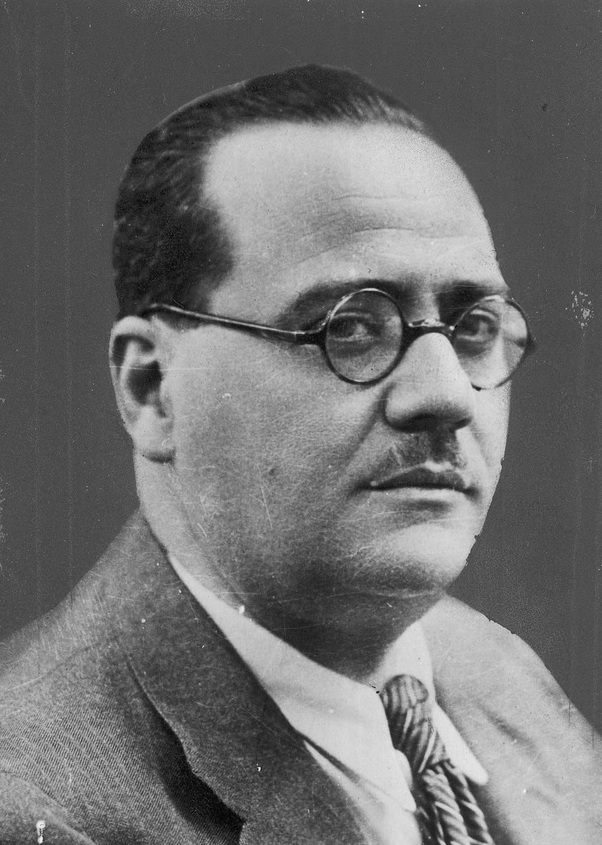
Negrin in the 1920s

During his stay in Germany, Negrin had become very close to German social democracy, then at one of the moments of its maximum height and socio-political and cultural influence, but far removed from his conservative family tradition. Negrín joined the Spanish Socialist Workers' Party (PSOE) in the spring of 1929, at the height of the crisis of the dictatorship of General Miguel Primo de Rivera and the monarchy of Alfonso XIII. He aligned himself from the very beginning with the moderate and reformist faction headed by Indalecio Prieto – with whom he forged a close friendship that only broke down due to the civil war – and opposed to the one led by Francisco Largo Caballero, representing the left (Marxist and revolutionary) wing of the UGT trade union and the PSOE. From 1930 onwards, he declined his academic activity in favour of politics, and in 1934 he requested a leave of absence from his professorship. In the 1931 Spanish general election he was elected deputy for Las Palmas in the Canary Islands, and re-elected in 1933 and 1936.

Between April 1931 and July 1936, as political tension and social polarisation increased in Spain, Negrín identified in the socialist movement with Prieto's moderate positions and firmly opposed to the radical tendency led by Largo Caballero. The moderate faction of the PSOE, the majority in the executive committee, was in favour of maintaining the coalition with Prime Minister Manuel Azaña's Republicans in order to complete the ambitious programme of social democratic political and social reforms that had been launched by the left-wing government between 1931 and 1933 (secularisation of the state, agrarian reform, administrative decentralisation, military reform, progressive labour legislation, etc.). According to Prieto, Negrín and their supporters, this republican-socialist conjunction was essential to successfully promote the reforms and overcome the double opposition offered by the possible reaction of the right-wing defenders of the status quo with the help of the army and by the also possible revolution of the anarcho-syndicalist or communist-inspired workers' left.

In Spanish socialism he represented a clear option of republicanism and centrism, identifiable with the political position of his friend Indalecio Prieto. With regard to the revolutionary general strike of 1934 – against the appointment of three ministers of the conservative Catholic Spanish Confederation of Autonomous Rights (Spanish: Confederación Española de Derechas Autónomas, CEDA) to the right-wing government of Alejandro Lerroux – sponsored by Largo Caballero, Negrín opted for the option of republican unity advocated by Prieto as opposed to the revolutionary project put forward by Largo Caballero, which caused him to distance himself from Luis Araquistain and led to an irreparable split within Spanish socialism. The events of 1934, in particular the uprising in Asturias, were a prelude to the civil war.

== Spanish Civil War ==
After the military uprising in Morocco on 17 July 1936, Spain was rapidly divided in two: a "Republican" or "Loyalist" Spain under the government of the Second Spanish Republic and the workers' organizations, and a "Nationalist" Spain under the insurgent generals, and, eventually, under the leadership of General Francisco Franco and his party FET y de las JONS. The Republic faced tremendous odds from the outset, including the Nationalist military superiority, internal divisions, and European non-intervention. The military uprising sparked a social revolution in the Republican zone, primarily in Catalonia, Aragon, Andalusia, and parts of Valencia.

The Non-Intervention Agreement, initiated by the French and the British governments, and signed in August 1936, in which European powers renounced all trade in war material, direct or indirect, effectively subjected the Spanish Republic to international isolation and a de facto economic embargo and placed the Republic – and only the Republic – at an enormous material disadvantage throughout the conflict. Italy and Germany supported the Spanish Nationalists from the outset of the Civil War. The Soviet Union began supporting the Republicans four months later.

From the first moment of the war, Negrin combined his activities as a deputy and, later, as a minister, with frequent visits in his private car to different places on the front line of Madrid to encourage the combatants and provide them with food and supplies. Negrín helped many people to escape from the revolutionary checas in July and August 1936. His personal courage in pursuit of this was attested to by a friend who recounted that he "made every effort, at considerable risk to himself... to save people in Madrid." As a result, Negrin was nearly killed by anarchists but was saved by the intervention of finance ministry security staff.

=== Minister of Finance ===
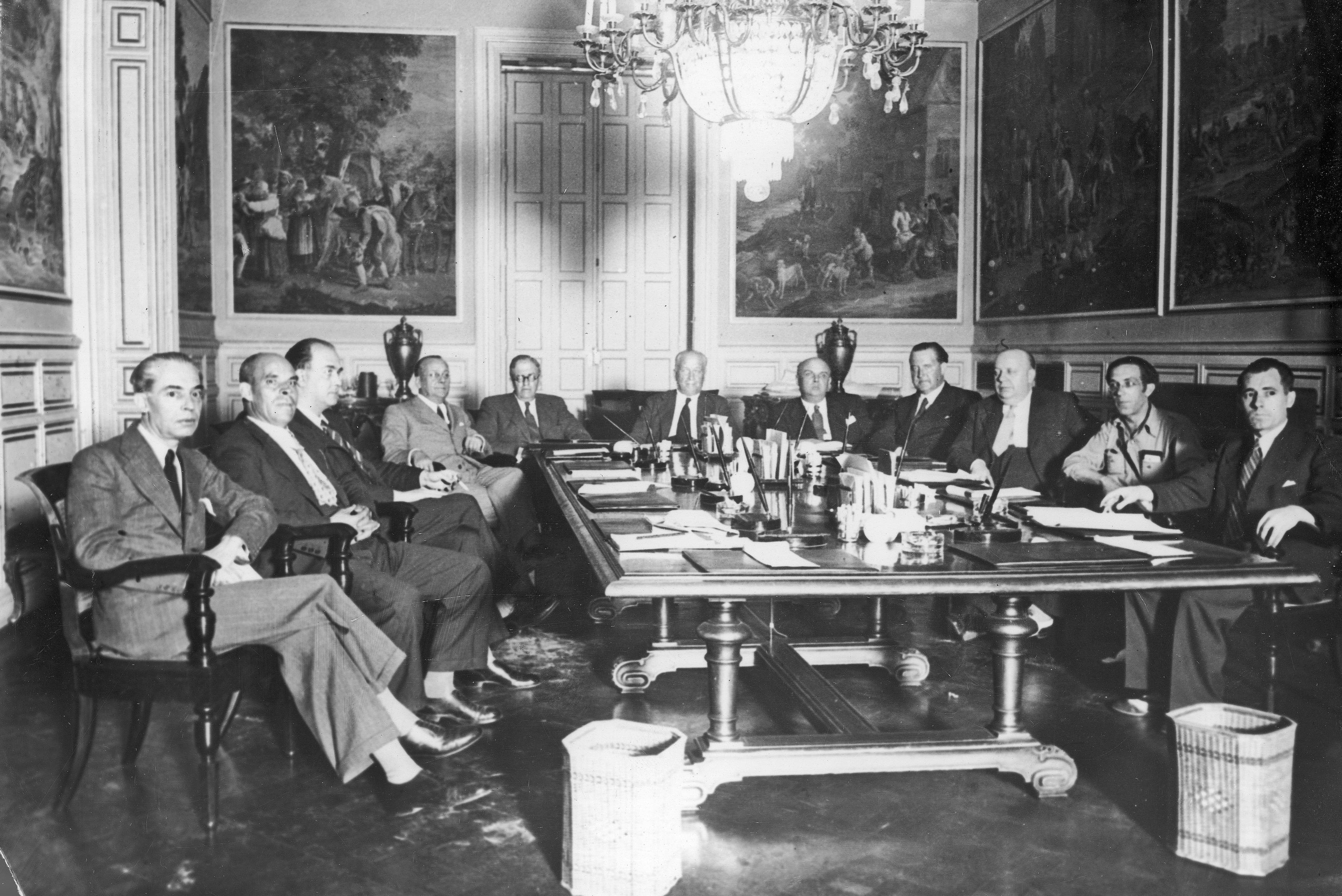
A meeting of the Largo Caballero cabinet in 1936

He was named Minister of Finance in September 1936 in the government of Largo Caballero. He only accepted the post out of party discipline, as he considered that Largo Caballero as Prime Minister gave an excessively radical image of the Republic to the outside world and was a serious political and diplomatic blunder that would make it impossible to obtain vital aid from France and Great Britain. As the finance minister, he built up the Carabineros (custom guards), a force of 20,000 men which was later nicknamed the "Hundred Thousand Sons of Negrín" (an allusion to the Hundred Thousand Sons of Saint Louis), in order to recover the control of the French frontier posts, which had been seized by the anarchist Confederación Nacional del Trabajo (CNT).

With the approval of President Azaña, Largo Caballero and other influential ministers (including Prieto), he took the controversial decision to transfer the Spanish gold reserves to the Soviet Union in return for arms and equipment urgently needed to continue the war (October 1936). Worth $500 million at the time (another $240 million had been sent to France in July), critics argued that this action put the Republican government under the control of Joseph Stalin.

=== Prime minister ===
The Barcelona May Days of 1937, when factions on the Republican side of the Spanish Civil War engaged each other in street battles and anarchist and communist Republican soldiers fought for control of strategic points in Barcelona, led to a governmental crisis that forced Largo Caballero to resign. On 17 May 1937, President Manuel Azaña named Negrín the 135th Prime Minister of Spain, to end the indiscipline and disarray in the rearguard. Negrín's government included Indalecio Prieto named minister of War, Navy and Air, Julián Zugazagoitia as minister of interior (both socialists), the communists Jesús Hernández Tomás as minister of education and Vicente Uribe as minister of agriculture, the republicans José Giral as foreign minister and Bernardo Giner de los Ríos as public works minister, the Basque Manuel Irujo as minister of justice and the Catalan Nationalist Jaume Aiguader as minister of labour. Negrín's energetic and willful management, exemplified in his campaign slogan "Resistir es vencer" (transl. "To resist is to win"), captured for a time the hopes and desires of the depressed and semi-despondent rearguard and revived the meagre forces of the Spanish Republican Armed Forces.

==== Goals ====
In the anarchist-controlled areas, Aragon and Catalonia, in addition to the temporary military success, there was a vast social revolution in which the workers and peasants collectivised land and industry, and set up councils parallel to the paralyzed Republican government. Negrin's main objectives were to fortify the central government, to reorganize and fortify the Republican Armed Forces and to impose law and order in the Republican-held area, against largely independent armed militias of the labour unions (CNT) and parties, thus steadily dismantling the social revolution inside the Republic. He also wanted to break the international isolation of the Republic in order to get the arms embargo – imposed by the Non-Intervention Committee – lifted, and from 1938 to search an international mediation in order to finish the war. He also wished to normalize the position of the Catholic Church inside the Republic. Eventually, the 'normalization' in Spain was intended to connect the Spanish conflict with Second World War, which he believed to be imminent, although the Munich Agreement between Hitler and British Prime Minister Neville Chamberlain on 30 September 1938 definitively made all hope of outside aid vanish.

==== PCE's support ====
Although Negrín had always been a centrist in the PSOE, he maintained links with the Communist Party of Spain (Spanish: Partido Comunista de España, PCE), whose policies at that point were in favour of a Popular Front alignment. Negrín relied on the Communists to curtail the anarchist wing of the Spanish Left, and was forced to rely on the Soviet Union, then led by Stalin, for weapons and armament, because of the arms embargo. The government and the communists were able to exploit their access to Soviet arms to restore government control over the war effort, through diplomacy and force. The militias of the anarchists and the Workers' Party of Marxist Unification (Spanish: Partido Obrero de Unificación Marxista, POUM) were integrated into the regular army, albeit with resistance. The POUM Trotskyists were outlawed and denounced by the Soviet-aligned Communists as an instrument of the fascists.

Official circles in London and Washington applauded Negrin's credentials and his ‘iron hand’; Churchill welcomed his ‘law-and-order stance’. In order to maintain arms supplies from the Soviet Union Negrín condoned the suppression of the POUM and the arrest and murder of POUM leader Andres Nin by the NKVD-controlled secret police. Nin's mysterious disappearance and death led to disillusionment among the supporters of a social revolution. According to the anarchist leader Diego Abad de Santillán "For us, the social vanguard of Spain, the result would be the same if Negrín were to be victorious with his communist cohorts, or if Franco were to be victorious, with his Italians and Germans." Republican Spain needed the Soviet Union's support because the Non-Intervention Agreement imposed on the conflict prevented the democratically elected government from acquiring arms and other war materiel in its own right on the open market arms to defend itself.

==== Military situation ====
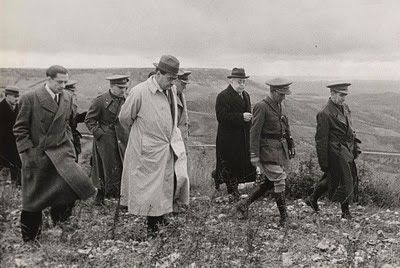
President Azaña and Negrín (wearing a light-coloured coat in the middle) visit a republican front on the outskirts of Barcelona accompanied by two of the main military authorities of the Republic: Vicente Rojo Lluch and José Miaja, in November 1937.

On the military level, along 1937 he launched a series of offensives in June (Huesca and Segovia), July, Brunete and August, Belchite, in order to halt the Nationalist offensive in the North, but all failed and by October the Nationalists had occupied all of the Northern territory. Beginning December, he launched an offensive in order to free Teruel, but by February the Republican Army had to retreat after suffering heavy losses and the rebel faction launched a counter-offensive in Aragon, cutting in half the Republican-held zone. In July 1938 Negrín launched an offensive in order to cross the Ebro River and reconnect the two Republican-held zones. The Republican army managed to cross the Ebro, but by November had to retire after it suffered heavy casualties and lost most of its materiel. Finally, in February 1939, he ordered to launch an offensive in Extremadura to stop the Nationalists advancement in their offensive against Catalonia, but was halted after a few days and Catalonia fell.

==== Home front ====
The military situation of the Spanish Republic deteriorated steadily under Negrín's government, largely because of the superior quality of the opposing generals and officers many of whom were veterans of the Rif War, and by 1938 the overwhelming advantage of the rebels in terms of men (20%), aircraft and artillery provided by Germany and Italy. The Munich Agreement effectively caused a collapse in Republican morale by ending hope of an anti-fascist alliance with Western powers. Throughout 1938, the unremitting succession of serious military defeats and the failure to secure Franco-British aid, was reflected in a deterioration of material living conditions in the rear (especially in terms of food) that deeply affected the political morale of the popular and military resistance of the Republican side. Late 1938, the freezing and half starved civilian population in the Siege of Madrid was suffering from severe malnutrition due to the restricted daily ration of 100 grams of bread and lentils (nicknamed "Dr Negrín's pills"). Disheartened by a fifth column, a war weariness took hold of Madrid and defeatism was widespread.

==== Peace negotiations ====
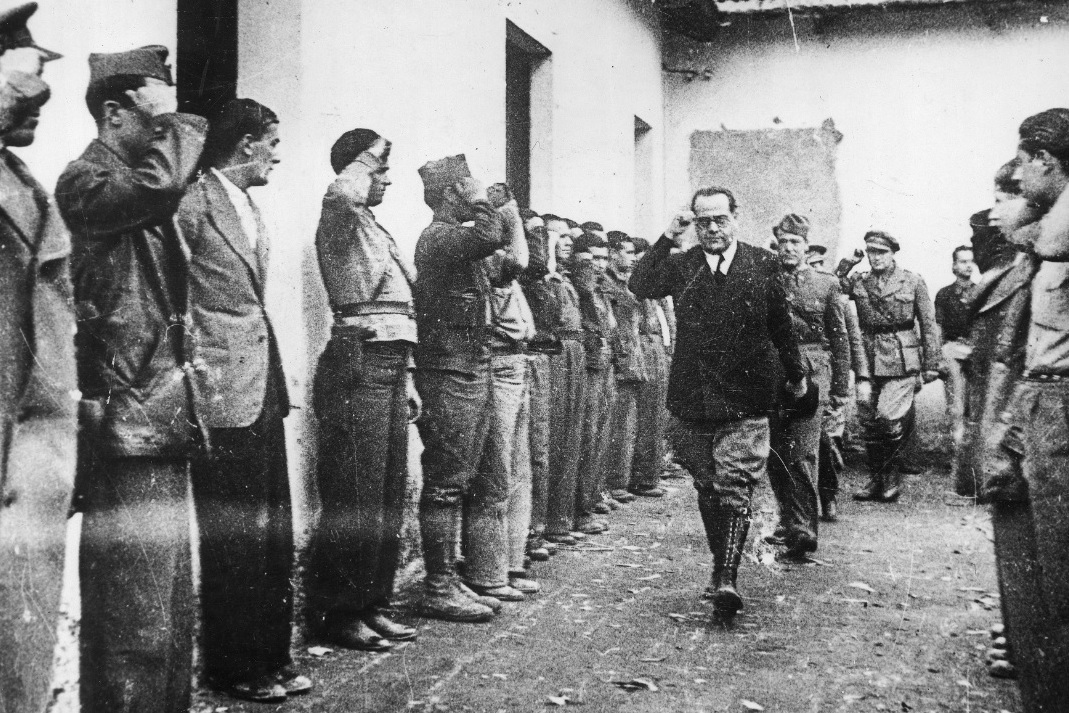
Negrin inspecting troops

In May 1938, Negrín issued the "Thirteen Points" (Trece Puntos), a program for peace negotiations, including absolute independence of Spain, liberty of conscience, protection of the regional liberties, universal suffrage, an amnesty for all Spaniards and agrarian reform, but Franco rejected any peace deal. Before the fall of Catalonia and the capture of Barcelona by the Nationalists on 26 January 1939, Negrín proposed, in the meeting of the Cortes in Figueres, capitulation with the sole condition of respecting the lives of the vanquished and the holding of a plebiscite so the Spanish people could decide the form of government, but Franco again rejected the new peace deal. On 9 February 1939, Negrín moved to the Central Zone (30% of the Spanish territory) with the intention of defending the remaining territory of the republic until the start of the general European conflict, and organize the evacuation of those most at risk. Negrín thought that there was no other course but resistance, because the Nationalists refused to negotiate any peace deal:

To fight on because there was no other choice, even if winning was not possible, then to salvage what we could – and at the very end our self respect... Why go on resisting? Quite simply because we knew what capitulation would mean.

The critical year of 1938 saw a rupture in the PSOE and the political and personal friendship between Negrín and Prieto. Prieto was removed from the Defence ministry for his defeatism and joined with Largo Caballero and Julián Besteiro (the leader of the PSOE right-wing faction) in denouncing the government's policy as favourable to the communists and opposed to the idea of international mediation. Negrín explained his position to his friend and confidant Juan Simeón Vidarte:

Do you think this odious servitude does not weigh as heavily on me as on anyone else? But there is no other way. When I speak to our friends in France, it is all promises and good words. Then inconveniences begin to arise, and of what was promised there is nothing left. Nothing remains of what was promised. The only reality, however much it pains us, is to accept the help of the Soviet Union, or to surrender unconditionally. (...) What else can I do? Negotiated peace always; unconditional surrender so that half a million Spaniards will be shot, never.

==== Casado's coup ====
After the fall of Barcelona, and the exodus to France of nearly 500,000 Republican soldiers and civilians, President Manuel Azaña fled to France, where he resigned as President of the Republic on 3 March 1939. Colonel Segismundo Casado, joined by Besteiro, general José Miaja, Cipriano Mera and disillusioned anarchist leaders – tired of fighting, which they regarded then as hopeless – planned a coup d'état. Seeking better surrender terms, they seized power in Madrid on 5 March 1939, created the National Defence Council (Consejo Nacional de Defensa), and deposed Negrín. On 6 March, Negrín fled to France by plane. Although the troops led by the PCE rejected the coup on Madrid they were defeated by Cipriano Mera's troops. The uprising against the Negrín government succeeded, at the cost of nearly 2,000 lives. The Junta tried to negotiate a peace deal with the nationalists, but Franco only accepted an unconditional surrender of the Republic. Finally all the members of the Junta (except Besteiro) fled, and by 31 March 1939 the Nationalists seized all the Spanish territory.

== Exile and death ==
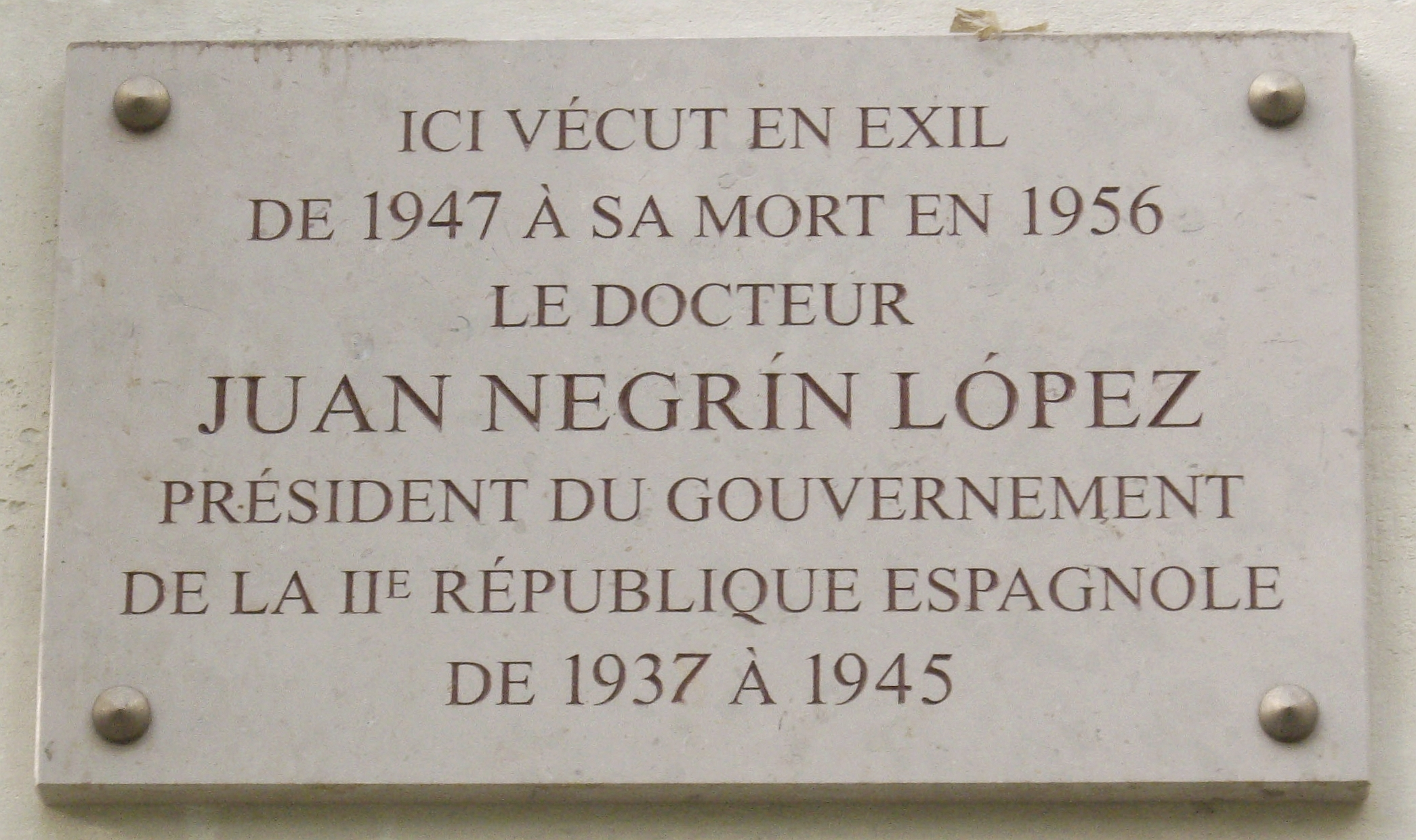
Commemorative plaque, 78 bis, avenue Henri-Martin, 16th arr., Paris

Unlike President Azaña, Negrín remained in Spain until the final collapse of the Republican front and his fall from office in March 1939. Negrín decided to openly support the Franco-British war effort against Germany and Italy, remaining in Paris until the fall of France (June 1940) and then going to London. He resided there throughout the Second World War, repeatedly refusing to leave Europe and seek safe haven in Mexico, as did a large number of the Republican leadership. He organized the S.E.R.E. (Servicio de Evacuación de Refugiados Españoles) to help Republican exiles. He remained prime minister of the Spanish Republican government in Exile between 1939 and 1945 (although ignored by most of the exiled political forces).

The Francoist dictatorship stripped Negrín of his academic position and confiscated his estate. In July 1941 he was sentenced to the exorbitant fine of 100 million pesetas by the Special Court of the Law of Political Responsibilities, while in September 1941, the Special Court for the Repression of Freemasonry and Communism sentenced him to 30 years in prison (the maximum penalty, even though Negrin was neither a Mason nor a Communist). His father was imprisoned in Las Palmas for the mere fact of being his father, leaving prison in 1941 to die shortly thereafter in poverty after having been illegally expropriated of all his property.

=== Disagreements with exile community ===
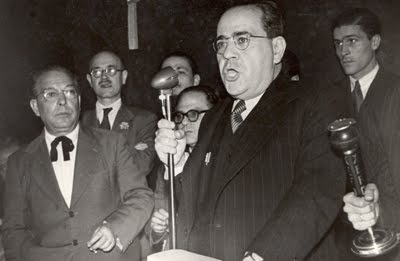
Negrín's resignation speech in Mexico, 3 September 1945.

In August 1945, at the end of the war with the defeat of the Axis powers, Negrin tried to gather the unanimous support of all the political forces in exile in order to offer a unitary republican front that could gather the support of the allied governments against Franco's dictatorship, taking advantage of his international discredit and the strong rejection that his recent behaviour of sympathy and support for the Italian-German war effort had provoked. In Negrin's opinion, only such a united front would serve as a guarantee before Washington and London of the presence of a replacement alternative to the Franco regime that did not run the risk of resuming the horrors of civil war. However, in view of the impossibility of gaining the support of all the political forces in exile, Negrín resigned from his position as head of the government of the Republic in exile before the plenary session of the Cortes in exile meeting in Mexico in August 1945. He was succeeded by the government-in-exile of José Giral. The PSOE expelled Negrín and a number of additional party members through a note published in El Socialista on 23 April 1946, (Note: The membership of Negrín had been suspended already since the Casado coup in 1939.) before the celebration of a party congress in Toulouse.

To no avail, in 1948 Negrín spoke out in favour of Franco's Spain's participation in the post-war Marshall Plan, which was opposed by the Spanish Republican government in exile. In his opinion, the economic assistance to Spain was indispensable to the economic recovery of Europe, while its exclusion could have no other result than to increase further the sufferings of the Spanish people. According to Negrín, dreaming of the re-establishment of the Republic through hunger and the impoverishment of Spain was a mistake and mere flawed wishful thinking.

=== Death and aftermath ===
Negrín died from a heart attack in Paris on 12 November 1956 at the age of 64, and is buried at the Père Lachaise Cemetery. After the death of Negrín, his son Rómulo Negrín, following the instructions of his father, handed over the so-called "Negrín dossier" – an incomplete series of documents related to the administration of the gold deposited in the Soviet Union – to the government of Francoist Spain in order to prove that it had been spent entirely for the Republican war effort. Negrín had refused to hand over documentation to the exiled Republican government for over 15 years. Willingly handing the documentation over to the Francoist authorities caused profound distress in the exile community. The Francoist authorities accepted the documentation, but publicly hushed up its content so as not to have to negate the propaganda myth of the Spanish gold stolen and squandered by the Republicans in Moscow.

== Legacy ==
According to the historian Stanley G. Payne, after the end of the civil war there was no person more hated. Franco's side considered him a "red traitor", while within the Republican camp, some of his former allies reproached him for the "useless" prolongation of the war and for having "served" the plans of the Soviet Union. Payne's assessment of Negrín is that he was not an extreme revolutionary, but neither was he a democrat:

He believed that the salvation of Spain lay in a strong authoritarian leftist regime, with a statist economic policy based on extensive nationalization of industry but not on extreme revolutionary collectivization, and this approach happened to coincide up to a point with Comintern policy. He did not, however, seek a Communist regime in Spain, and probably hoped to avoid such a thing, but he recognized that for the time being the Republic was dependent on Soviet support.

On the other hand, a New York Times editorial at the time of his death said:

It will be long before the figure of Don Juan Negrín stands before history in clear outline. He aroused great passions in his life and made many bitter enemies, as he did devoted friends. The Franco regime labeled Dr. Negrín falsely as a "Red." He never was remotely that. As Premier under desperate circumstances, Dr. Negrín accepted the support of Russia, the only country aiding Republican Spain or backing her in the League of Nations. His own government was never dominated by the Communists. It was a Popular Front, dominated by Juan Negrín. For many in and out of Spain Dr. Negrín represented much that was finest about Republican Spain and the Spaniards who fought so bravely and forlornly against fascism. He never had anything to fear from history.

While recognizing his talent and abilities, historian Antony Beevor has a rather negative assessment of Negrín:

Negrin tends to be portrayed either as a puppet of Moscow or else as a man who, recognizing necessity, tried to ride the communist tiger for the benefit of the Spanish Republic. Both interpretations are misleading. […] Like many men who are conscious of their ability, he showed himself to be a firm believer in hierarchy, an authoritarian with few scruples who knew what was best for others. Not surprisingly he soon acquired a strong taste for power, once it was offered to him. In his case it appeared to run parallel to gross tastes for food and sex rather than act as a substitute.

Gabriel Jackson's biography depicts Negrín as "a fundamentally honest and decent human being who sacrificed his health, reputation, and academic career in a failed attempt to save his country from disaster," and as "an accomplished scientist and cosmopolitan intellectual who in normal circumstances would have never had to become a politician, let alone take his country's reins during the most difficult years of its long history." Jackson was a staunch defender of Negrín. "Negrín was one of those rare prepared politicians, with character; very valuable for his time," he said. According to Jackson:

Negrín’s policy of resistance and constant diplomatic effort was the right one – he visited Paris secretly a number of times during the war, to get the French to realize that they themselves were going to be the next victims. I am also convinced that if England and France had supported the Republic and stood up to Hitler, history would have taken a different course.

Negrín was one of the most controversial characters of the Spanish Civil War. "Demonized or praised, Negrin has been considered both a faithful servant of the permanent communist conspiracy in the pay of Moscow, and the most loyal politician to the Republican cause because of his faith in the final triumph, or he has been defined as a kind of seer who knew how to predict the inexorability of the Second World War, so that his policy of resistance at all costs "Resistir es vencer" (transl. "To resist is to win") would have led to the victory of the Republic, if the Spanish war had lasted five more months," say Spanish historians Ángel Bahamonde Magro and Javier Cervera Gil.

According to Enrique Moradiellos, Negrín was probably the most enigmatic or forgotten great political figure of the civil war that came to personify the spirit of resistance on the Republican side with as much fervour as General Francisco Franco embodied the victorious Nationalist side in the war. In the opinion of Ricardo Miralles (es), Negrín was "the man for the job" at a crucial moment, just as Churchill was in Britain and De Gaulle in France, to fight fascist aggression by Nazi Germany and Fascist Italy. Negrín was post-humously rehabilitated by the PSOE in 2008 following the outcomes of more impartial historical research by Hugh Thomas, Moradiellos, Helen Graham, Gabriel Jackson, Miralles, Paul Preston and Ángel Viñas, that cleared Negrín of most of the unjustified allegations against him.

In 2010, a Spanish documentary film, Ciudadano Negrín (Citizen Negrín), directed by Sigfrid Monleón, Imanol Uribe and Carlos Álvarez Pérez was released. The documentary reconstructs the life of Juan Negrín from a variety of sources, including his grandchildren Carmen and Juan. With the help of historians such as Gabriel Jackson and Ángel Viñas, the film aims to give the protagonist a voice, using his writings, speeches and letters to construct the story. The production also benefits from the discovery of home movies filmed by Negrín himself in exile. In 2013, Negrín's granddaughter Carmen Negrín handed over 150,000 original documents that he had transferred to France in several shipments to save them from destruction. The use and custody of the legacy rests with the Juan Negrín Foundation (Note: Fundación Juan Negrín), a non-profit organization founded in Las Palmas, on his home island of Gran Canaria, in 1992.

== Cabinets ==
First Negrín cabinet: 17 May 1937 – 5 April 1938		
Ministry	Officeholder	Party
Prime Minister. Finance & Economy	Juan Negrín López	Spanish Socialist Workers' Party (PSOE)
State	José Giral	Republican Left (IR)
Justice	Manuel de Irujo Ollo	Basque Nationalist Party (PNV)
Justice	Mariano Ansó Zunzarren (from 10 December 1937)	Republican Left (IR)
National Defense	Indalecio Prieto	Spanish Socialist Workers' Party (PSOE)
Interior	Julián Zugazagoitia	Spanish Socialist Workers' Party (PSOE)
Public Education and Health	Jesús Hernández Tomás	Communist Party of Spain (PCE)
Public Works and Communications	Bernardo Giner de los Ríos	Republican Union (UR)
Agriculture	Vicente Uribe	Communist Party of Spain (PCE)
Labor and Social Assistance	Jaume Aiguader	Republican Left of Catalonia (ERC)

Second Negrín Cabinet: 5 April 1938 – 6 March 1939
Ministry	Officeholder	Party
Prime Minister & National Defense	Juan Negrín López	Spanish Socialist Workers' Party (PSOE)
State'	Julio Álvarez del Vayo	Spanish Socialist Workers' Party (PSOE)
Interior	Paulino Gómez Sáenz	Spanish Socialist Workers' Party (PSOE)
Justice	Ramón González Peña	Spanish Socialist Workers' Party (PSOE)
Agriculture	Vicente Uribe	Communist Party of Spain (PCE)
Public Education and Health	Segundo Blanco	Confederación Nacional del Trabajo (CNT)
Finance and Economy	Francisco Méndez Aspe	Republican Left (IR)
Public Works	Antonio Velao Oñate	Republican Left (IR)
Communications and Transport	Bernardo Giner de los Ríos	Republican Union (UR)
Labor and Social Assistance	Jaume Aiguader	Republican Left of Catalonia (ERC)
Labor and Social Assistance	José Moix Regás (from 18 August 1938)	Unified Socialist Party of Catalonia (PSUC)
Without portfolio	José Giral	Republican Left (IR)
Without portfolio	Manuel de Irujo Ollo	Basque Nationalist Party (PNV)

== Sources ==
- Abad de Santillán, Diego (1940). Why We Lost the War. Buenos Aires.
- (in Spanish) Bahamonde Magro, Ángel; Cervera Gil, Javier (1999). Así terminó la Guerra de España. Madrid: Marcial Pons. ISBN 84-95379-00-7.
- Beevor, Antony (2006). 'The battle for Spain. The Spanish civil war. London: Penguin Books. ISBN 0-14-303765-X.
- (in Spanish) "Biografía de Juan Negrín López". Diccionario Biográfico electrónico de la Real Academia de la Historia.
- Faber, Sebastiaan (2011). "Review of: Gabriel Jackson, 'Juan Negrín: Spanish Republican War Leader'" (PDF). Bulletin for Spanish and Portuguese Historical Studies. 35 (1). Association for Spanish and Portuguese Historical Studies: 183–185. doi:10.26431/0739-182X.1033 (inactive 12 July 2025).
- Fraser, Ronald (2011). "How the Republic was Lost". New Left Review. 67 (January/February).
- Graham, Helen (2002). The Spanish Republic at War, 1936–1939. Cambridge; New York: Cambridge University Press. ISBN 978-0-52-1459327.
- Graham, Helen (2005). The Spanish Civil War. A very short introduction. New York: Oxford University Press. ISBN 978-0-19-280377-1.
- Jackson, Gabriel (1965). The Spanish Republic and the Civil War, 1931–1939. Princeton: Princeton University Press. ISBN 0-691-00757-8.
- Jackson, Gabriel (2010). Juan Negrín: physiologist, socialist and Spanish Republican war leader. Brighton: Sussex Academic Press. ISBN 978-1-84519-376-8. Archived from the original on 3 February 2020.
- (in Spanish) Moradiellos, Enrique (2000). "El enigma del doctor Juan Negrín: Perfil político de un gobernante socialista". Revista de Estudios Políticos (109). Madrid: Centro de Estudios Políticos y Constitucionales: 245–264. ISSN 0048-7694.
- (in Spanish) Moradiellos, Enrique (2004). 1936: Los mitos de la Guerra Civil. Barcelona: Ediciones Península. ISBN 84-8307-624-1.
- (in Spanish) Moradiellos, Enrique (2007). "El doctor Negrín y las cuentas financieras del exilio republicano. Una ponderación rectificadora" (PDF). Historia del presente (10): 115–142. ISSN 1579-8135.
- Ochoa, S. (1980). "A Pursuit of a Hobby". Annual Review of Biochemistry. 49: 1–30. doi:10.1146/annurev.bi.49.070180.000245. PMID 6773467.
- (in Spanish) Otero Carvajal, Luis Enrique (2006). La destrucción de la ciencia en España: depuración universitaria en el franquismo. Madrid: Editorial Complutense. ISBN 84-7491-808-1.
- Payne, Stanley G. (2007). 40 preguntas fundamentales sobre la guerra civil, cap. 24: Juan Negrín: ¿patriota español u hombre de Moscú?. Madrid: La Esfera de los Libros. pp. 275–293. ISBN 978-84-9734-573-6.
- Payne, Stanley G. (1 July 2009). "El problema Negrín". Revista de Libros (in Spanish).
- Payne, Stanley G. (2012). The Spanish Civil War. Cambridge; New York: Cambridge University Press. ISBN 978-1-107-00226-5.
- Preston, Paul (2006). The Spanish Civil War. Reaction, Revolution & Revenge. London: Harper Perennial. ISBN 978-0-00-723207-9.
- Preston, Paul (2012). The Spanish Holocaust: Inquisition and Extermination in Twentieth-Century Spain. New York; London: W.W. Norton. ISBN 978-0-393-06476-6.
- (in Spanish) Ruiz, Julius (2012). La justicia de Franco. Barcelona: RBA Libros. ISBN 978-84-9006-243-2.
- Thomas, Hugh (2003). The Spanish Civil War. London: Penguin Books. ISBN 978-0-14-101161-5.
- (in Spanish) Vidarte, Juan Simeón (1973). Todos fuimos culpables: Testimonio de un socialista español. México DF: Fondo de Cultura Económica.
- (in Spanish) Viñas, Ángel (8 July 2008). "Negrín y 35 viejos militantes socialistas". El País.

Political offices
Preceded by Enrique Ramos Ramos	Minister of the Treasury; 1936–1938	Succeeded by Francisco Méndez Aspe
Preceded by Francisco Largo Caballero	Prime Minister of Spain; 1937–1939	Succeeded by José Miaja
Preceded by Indalecio Prieto	Minister of National Defence; 1938–1939	Succeeded by Segismundo Casado
Preceded by Diego Martínez Barrio	President of the Spanish Republic in exile 1939–1945	Succeeded by Diego Martínez Barrio
Party political offices
Preceded by Enrique de Francisco	Deputy leader of the Socialist Group in the Congress of Deputies; 1933–1936	Succeeded by Enrique de Francisco
