= Julián Zugazagoitia =

Spanish journalist and politician

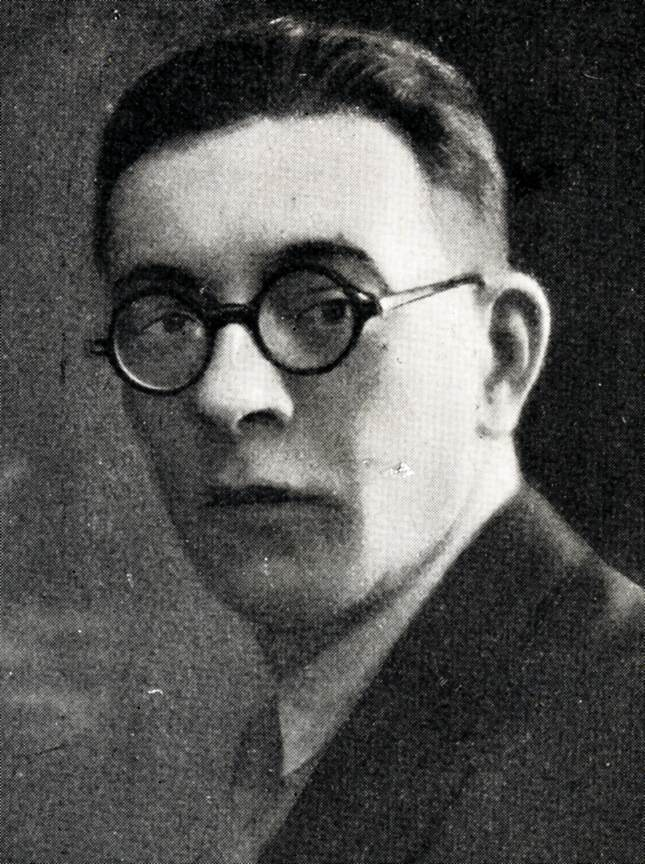
Zugazagoitia in 1925

Julián Zugazagoitia Mendieta (5 February 1899, Bilbao – 9 November 1940, Madrid) was a Spanish journalist and politician.

A member of the Spanish Socialist Workers' Party, he was close to Indalecio Prieto and the editor of the El Socialista in mid-1930s. In the first weeks of the Spanish Civil War he wrote against the paseos and denounced the anarchist and communist secret prisons (checas). In October 1936 he wrote in El Socialista: "The life of an adversary who surrenders is unassailable; no combatant can dispose of that life. That is not how the rebels behave. It matters not. It is how we should behave." In May 1937 he was appointed by the prime minister, Juan Negrín, as minister of Interior of the Second Spanish Republic. Because of the abduction and killing of Andreu Nin, he dismissed the Director General of Security, Antonio Ortega, and threatened to resign as minister.

In 1938, he supported the dissolution by force of the anarchist-controlled Consejo de Aragon. He was replaced in May 1938, but in April 1938, he was appointed secretary of the ministry of defence. After the war, he fled to France, but in 1940 was arrested by the Gestapo, handed over to Spain and executed. In France he wrote a history about the Spanish Civil War: Historia de la guerra en España, published in 1940.

== Bibliography ==
- Beevor, Antony. (2006). The battle for Spain. The Spanish civil war, 1936-1939. Penguin Books. London. ISBN 978-0-14-303765-1.
- Jackson, Gabriel. (1967). The Spanish Republic and the Civil War, 1931-1939. Princeton University Press. Princeton. ISBN 978-0-691-00757-1
- Preston, Paul. (2006). The Spanish Civil War. Reaction, revolution & revenge. Harper Perennial. London. ISBN 978-0-00-723207-9 ISBN 0-00-723207-1
- Thomas, Hugh. (2001). The Spanish Civil War. Penguin Books. London. ISBN 978-0-14-101161-5
