= Luis Araquistáin =

Spanish politician and writer

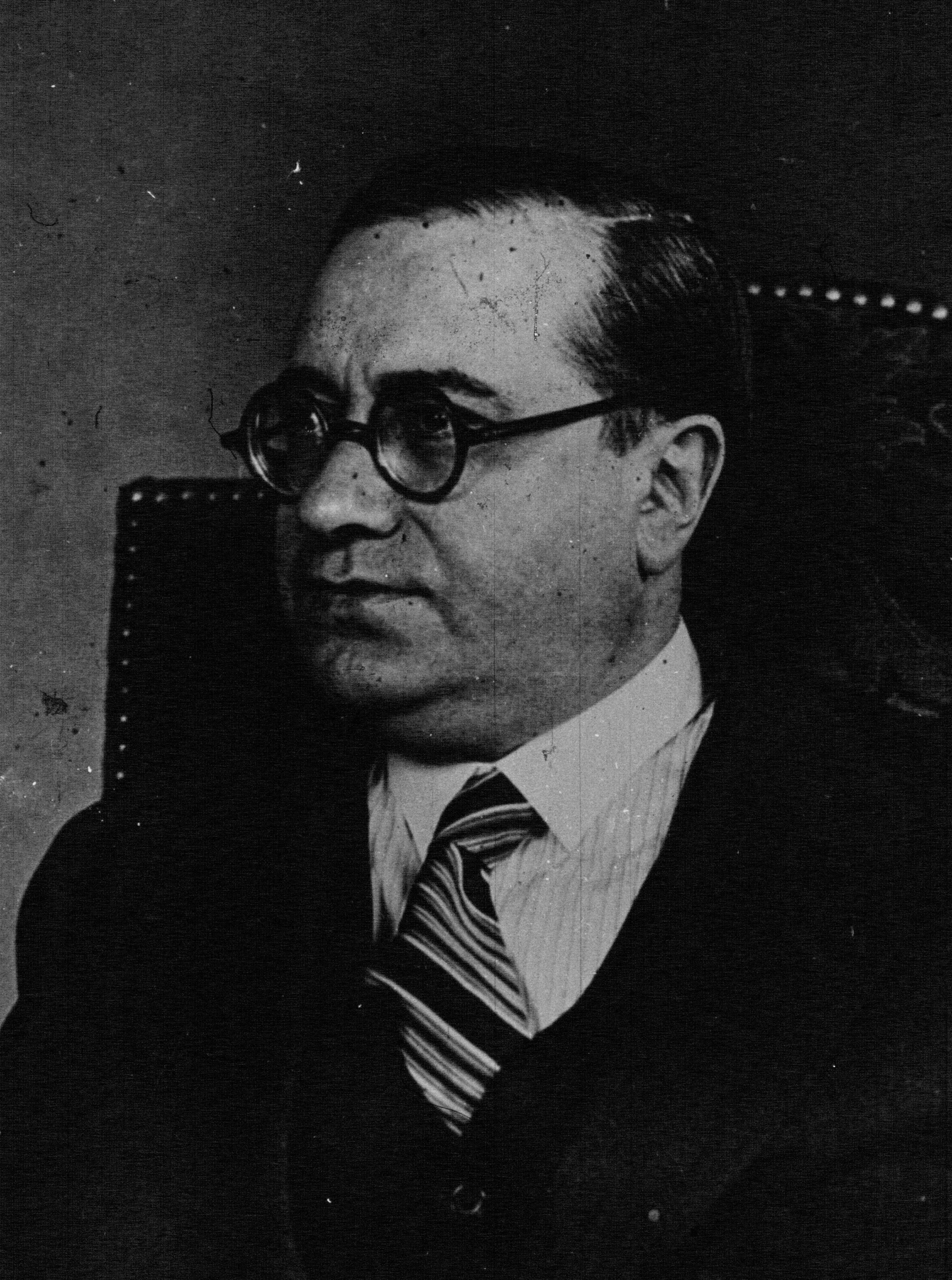
Luis Araquistáin in 1932

Luis Araquistáin Quevedo (Bárcena de Pie de Concha, Cantabria, Spain, 1886 – Geneva, Switzerland, 1959) was a Spanish politician and writer. Member of the Spanish Socialist Workers' Party (PSOE) from a young age, he belonged to the circle of Largo Caballero and Tomás Meabe, of whom he was a close friend.

In 1932 he was named ambassador to Germany and in September 1936 ambassador to France, where until May 1937 he took charge of buying arms for the Republican army in the Spanish Civil War.

He founded the journals España, Claridad and Leviatán.

Although his leanings before and during the war were decidedly revolutionary, later he became drawn to a socialism more 'European' in character, and was moved to insist on the necessity of unity between monarchists and republicans in order that a peaceful transition from Francoism to democracy might be effected. This position made him some enemies, but he developed a great understanding with other moderate members of the PSOE.

After the war he went into exile in Great Britain and later Switzerland, where he died in 1959. Just before his death Araquistáin edited the Spanish language magazine of the Congress for Cultural Freedom, Cuadernos.
