= Gabriel Jackson (Hispanist) =

American Hispanist (1921–2019)

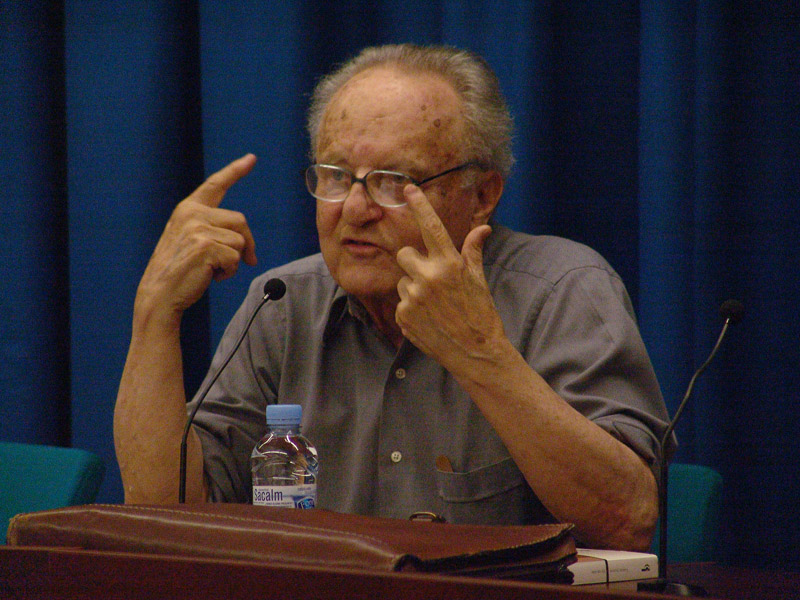
- Gabriel Jackson
- Born: March 10, 1921; Mount Vernon, New York, U.S.
- Died: November 3, 2019 (aged 98); Ashland, Oregon, U.S.

Academic background
- Education: Harvard University (AB); Stanford University (MA); University of Toulouse (PhD)
- Thesis: Joaquin Costa et les problèmes de l'Espagne moderne (1952)
- Doctoral advisor: Jacques Godechot

Academic work
- Discipline: modern history
- Sub-discipline: Spanish history
- Institutions: The Putney School (1946–1949); Goddard College (1952–1955); Wellesley College (1955–1960); Knox College (1962–1965); University of California, San Diego (1965–1983)
- Main interests: Spanish Civil War
- Notable works: The Spanish Republic and the Civil War 1931–39 (1965)

Gabriel Jackson (March 10, 1921 – November 3, 2019) was an American Hispanist, historian and journalist.

== Biography ==
Jackson was born into an educated Jewish family in Mount Vernon, New York, in 1921. He developed early a passion for playing the flute and followed the developments of Spanish Civil War in the newspapers as a teenager.

He studied history and literature under Americanists Perry Miller and F. O. Matthiessen at Harvard University. After obtaining his AB degree in 1942, he spent two months on a Harvard travelling fellowship in Mexico City, where he lived among Spanish Republican exiles, including the widow of former Spanish President Manuel Azaña. He served his country for four years in the Pacific War as an aircraft mechanic, photo interpreter, and cartographer. During the 1940s, he developed friendships with veterans of the Abraham Lincoln Brigade. He taught English, Spanish, and flute at The Putney School in Vermont from 1946 to 1949, before earning a master's degree at Stanford University in 1950 with a thesis on the educational program of the first Azaña government (1931–33). He then spent two years among Spanish Republican exiles in southern France as a Fulbright fellow along with his wife, and completed a PhD on the Regenerationist leader Joaquín Costa at the University of Toulouse under the supervision of Jacques Godechot in 1952.

After his return to the United States, he refused to testify to Roy Cohn about his classmates and his career was hampered by McCarthyism. He worked at Goddard College from 1952 to 1955, at Wellesley College (where he befriended the Spanish poet Jorge Guillén) from 1955 to 1960, and as an associate professor at Knox College in Illinois from 1962 to 1965. He conducted research in Spain for his first book as a Fulbright postdoctoral scholar in 1960–1961, and as a G.I. Bill recipient. He advised the Hispanic Foundation of the Library of Congress on Spanish history acquisitions. In 1965, he obtained a tenure-track job at the University of California, San Diego, where he stayed into his late years as a professor emeritus.

A disciple of Jaume Vicens i Vives and the prominent French historian Pierre Vilar, Jackson was a regular collaborator of the Spanish daily El País for many years. In 1966, he was awarded the American Historical Association's Herbert Baxter Adams Prize for his 1965 book The Spanish Republic and the Civil War, and in 2002, Spain's prestigious Nebrija Prize from the University of Salamanca.

After his retirement in 1983 he lived in Barcelona, Spain. He returned to the United States in the last decade of his life.

He had joined the American Historical Association, Phi Beta Kappa, and the American Association of University Professors before 1965.

== Works ==
- The Spanish Republic and the Civil War 1931–39. Princeton (N.J.): Princeton University Press, 1965
  - La República Española y la Guerra Civil: 1931–1939. Barcelona: Crítica, 1999
  - --do.--[Esplugues de Llobregat]: Orbis, 1985
  - --do.--Barcelona: Mundo Actual de Ediciones, 1978
- The Spanish Civil War: Domestic Crisis or international Conspiracy. Boston: D. C. Heath, 1967
  - --do.--Chicago: Quadrangle Books, 1972
  - Histoire de la Guerre civile de l'Espagne. Paris: Ruedo Ibérico, 1974
- Historian's Quest. New York: Knopf, 1969
  - Historia de un historiador. Madrid: Anaya & Mario Muchnik, cop. 1993
- A Concise History of the Spanish Civil War. London: Thames and Hudson, 1974
- Breve historia de la Guerra Civil Española. Barcelona : Grijalbo, 1986
  - --do.--[Paris]: Ruedo Ibérico, 1974
- Civilization & Barbarity in 20th Century Europe, 1999
- Civilización y barbarie en Europa del siglo XX. Barcelona: Planeta, 1997
- Fighting for Franco: International Volunteers in Nationalist Spain During the Spanish Civil War, 1936–39 by Judith Keene and Gabriel Jackson. Leicester University Press, 2001
  - Luchando por Franco: voluntarios europeos al servicio del España fascista. [Barcelona]: Salvat, 2002
- Making of Mediaeval Spain (Library of European Civilization)
- Juan Negrín: physiologist, socialist and Spanish Republican war leader. Cañada Blanch Centre for Contemporary Spanish Studies; Brighton: Sussex Academic Press, 2010
- Costa, Azaña, el Frente Popular y otros ensayos. Barcelona: Crítica, 2008—do.--Madrid: Turner, 1976
- Memoria de un historiador. Madrid: Temas de Hoy, 2001
- Ciudadano Jackson: visiones de la mundo contemporáneo. Barcelona: Martínez Roca, 2001
- Origines de la Guerra fría. Madrid: Información e Historia, 1993
- El Kapellmeister Mozart. Barcelona: Empúries, 1991
  - Mozart. Barcelona: Empúries, 1991
  - El difunto Kapellmeister Mozart. Barcelona: Muchnik, 1991
- Catalunya republicana i revolucionària: 1931–1939. Barcelona: Grijalbo, 1982
- La Guerra civil española: antologia de los principales cronistas de guerra americanos en España (editor) Barcelona: Icaria, 1978
- The Making of Medieval Spain. London: Thames and Hudson, 1972
  - --do.--[New York]: Harcourt Brace Jovanovich, 1972
  - Introducción a la España medieval; ed. 3a. Madrid: Alianza, 1979
