= Ángel Viñas =

Spanish economist, diplomat (born 1941)

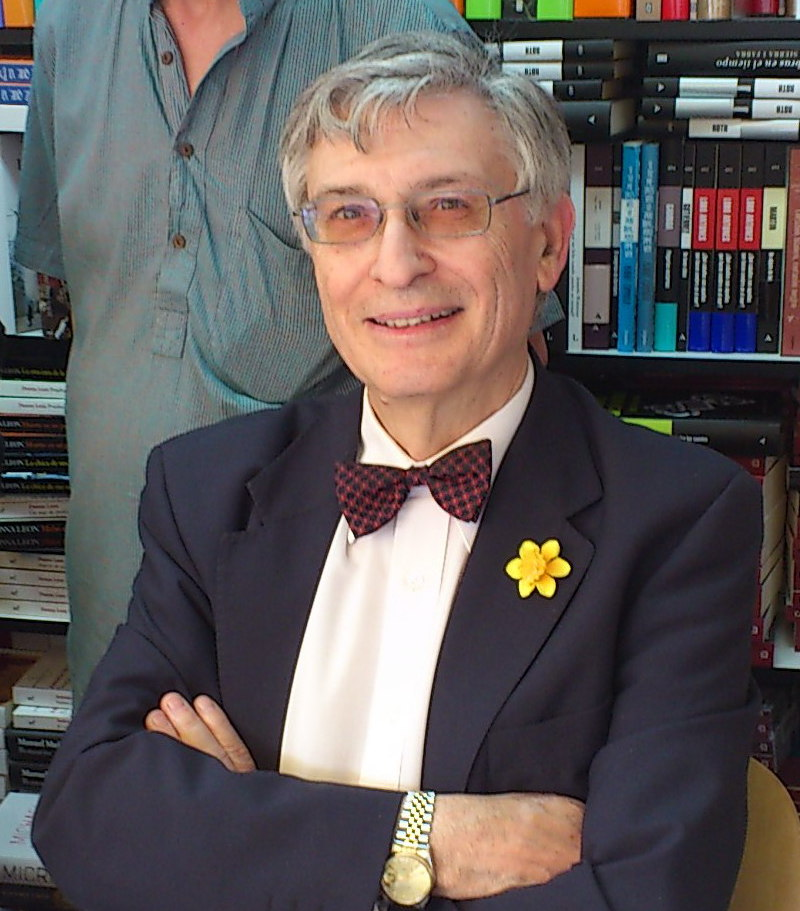
- Born: 1941 (age 84–85); Madrid, Spain
- Awards: Grand Cross of the Order of Civil Merit

Academic work
- Discipline: economics history
- Institutions: University of Valencia; University of Alcalá; National University of Distance Education; Complutense University of Madrid
- Main interests: Spanish Civil War

Ángel Viñas Martín (born 1941) is a Spanish economist and historian. He has published many works dealing with the Spanish Civil War focusing on the war finance as well as the international relations aspects of the conflict.

PhD. in Economics, he studied in Madrid, at the University of Hamburg, the University of Glasgow and the Free University of Berlin. He has been professor of Applied Economics and History at various universities (Valencia, Alcalá de Henares, UNED and Complutense), as well as professor at the Diplomatic School and member of its board of governors. He was awarded an extraordinary prize for his degree and doctorate in Economics at the University of Madrid and was runner-up for the National End of Career Award.

== Biography ==
Born in Madrid in 1941, he joined the Corps of Spanish State Economists and Trade Experts in 1968. He worked as adviser of the Foreign Minister Fernando Morán.

He has been professor of Applied Economics at the University of Valencia, the University of Alcalá, the National University of Distance Education and the Complutense University of Madrid.

== Decorations ==
- Grand Cross of the Order of Civil Merit (2010)

== Works ==
Author

- La Alemania nazi y el 18 de julio: antecedentes de la intervención alemana en la guerra civil española. Madrid: Alianza Editorial. 1974.
- El oro español en la Guerra Civil. Instituto de Estudios Fiscales. 1976.
- El Oro de Moscú: Alfa y omega de un mito franquista. Barcelona: Ediciones Grijalbo. 1979.
- Los pactos secretos de Franco con Estados Unidos: Bases, ayuda ecónomica, recortes de soberanía. Barcelona: Grijalbo. 1981.
- Guerra, dinero, dictadura. Ayuda fascista y autarquía en la España de Franco. Barcelona: Editorial Crítica. 1984.
- Armas y economía. Barcelona: Editorial Fontamara. 1984.
- Franco, Hitler y el estallido de la guerra civil: antecedentes y consecuencias. Madrid: Alianza Editorial. 2001.
- En las garras del águila. Los pactos con Estados Unidos de Francisco Franco a Felipe González, 1945–1995. Barcelona: Crítica. 2003.
- Al servicio de Europa. Innovación y crisis en la Comisión Europea. Madrid: Ediciones Complutense. 2005.
- La soledad de la República. El abandono de las democracias y el viraje hacia la Unión Soviética. Barcelona: Crítica. 2006.
- El escudo de la República. El oro de España, la apuesta soviética y los hechos de mayo de 1937. Barcelona: Crítica. 2007.
- El honor de la República. Entre el acoso fascista, la hostilidad británica y la política de Stalin. Barcelona: Crítica. 2009.
- La conspiración del general Franco y otras revelaciones acerca de una guerra civil desfigurada. Barcelona: Crítica. 2011.
- La República en Guerra. Contra Franco, Hitler, Mussolini y la hostilidad británica. Barcelona: Crítica. 2012.
- Las armas y el oro. Palancas de la guerra, mitos del franquismo. Pasado & Presente. 2013.
- La otra cara del caudillo. Mitos y realidades en la biografía de Franco. Barcelona: Crítica. 2015.
- Sobornos. De cómo Churchill y March compraron a los generales de Franco. Barcelona: Crítica. 2016.
- ¿Quién quiso la Guerra Civil? Historia de una conspiración. Barcelona: Crítica. 2019.

Co-author

- Solé Mariño, José María; Viñas, Ángel; Carandell, Josep Maria; Tusell, Javier (1998). Franco acorralado. La reconstrucción de Europa. Madrid: Historia 16.
- Viñas, Ángel; Hernández Sánchez, Fernando (2009). El desplome de la República. Barcelona: Crítica.
- Viñas, Ángel; Ull Laita, Miguel; Yusta Viñas, Cecilio (2018). El primer asesinato de Franco. La muerte del general Balmes y el inicio de la sublevación. Barcelona: Crítica.
