= Enrique Moradiellos =

Spanish historian (born 1961)

- Born: 1961 (age 64–65); Oviedo, Spain
- Awards: National Prize for History

Academic background
- Education: University of Oviedo
- Thesis: Neutralidad benévola. El gobierno británico y la insurrección militar española de 1936
- Doctoral advisor: José María Moro Barreñada; Paul Preston

Academic work
- Discipline: history
- Institutions: University of Extremadura
- Main interests: 20th-century Spain
- Notable works: Historia Minima de la Guerra Civila Española

Enrique Moradiellos García (born 1961) is a Spanish historian whose main field of research is 20th-century history of Spain.

== Biography ==
Moradiellos was born in 1961 in Oviedo. After obtaining a licentiate degree in history from the University of Oviedo, he earned a scholarship at London's Queen Mary College.

In 1989, he earned a PhD in history from the University of Oviedo, with his dissertation Neutralidad benévola. El gobierno británico y la insurrección militar española de 1936 ("Benevolent neutrality. The British government and the Spanish military insurrection of 1936"), officially supervised by José María Moro Barreñada yet de facto supervised by Paul Preston. He became a senior lecturer for the University of Extremadura in 1999 and professor of Contemporary History in 2006. In 2017, he was awarded the National Prize for History on account of his book Historia Minima de la Guerra Civila Española ("Small History of the Spanish Civil War").

In November 2020, Moradiellos was elected member of the Royal Academy of History, covering the seat left vacant after the death of Faustino Menéndez Pidal de Navascués.

== Selected works ==
- — (1996). La perfidia de Albión: El gobierno británico y la guerra civil española. Madrid: Siglo Veintiuno de España.
- — (2001). El reñidero de Europa. Las dimensiones de la guerra civil española. Barcelona: Península.
- — (2002). Francisco Franco. Crónica de un caudillo casi olvidado. Madrid: Biblioteca Nueva.
- — (2004). 1936. Los mitos de la guerra civil. Barcelona: Península.
- — (2005). Franco frente a Churchill. España y Gran Bretaña en la Segunda Guerra Mundial (1939–1945). Barcelona: Península.
- — (2006). Don Juan Negrín. Barcelona: Península.
- — (2016). Historia mínima de la Guerra Civil española. Madrid & Mexico: Turner-El Colegio de México.
- — (2018). Franco: Anatomy of a Dictator. London: I.B. Tauris.
