= Revisionism (Spain) =

Flag of the Second Spanish Republic

Revisionism is a term which emerged in the late 1990s and is applied to a group of historiographic theories related to the recent history of Spain.

According to users of the term, revisionists oppose what is presented as a generally accepted, orthodox view on the history of the Second Republic and the Civil War. Those who oppose the term view it as deprecatory and abusive.

Both advocates and opponents of the term accuse each other of pursuing a hidden political agenda; those dubbed revisionists are branded conservatives or post-Francoists, their opponents are branded progressists and left-wingers.

== History ==
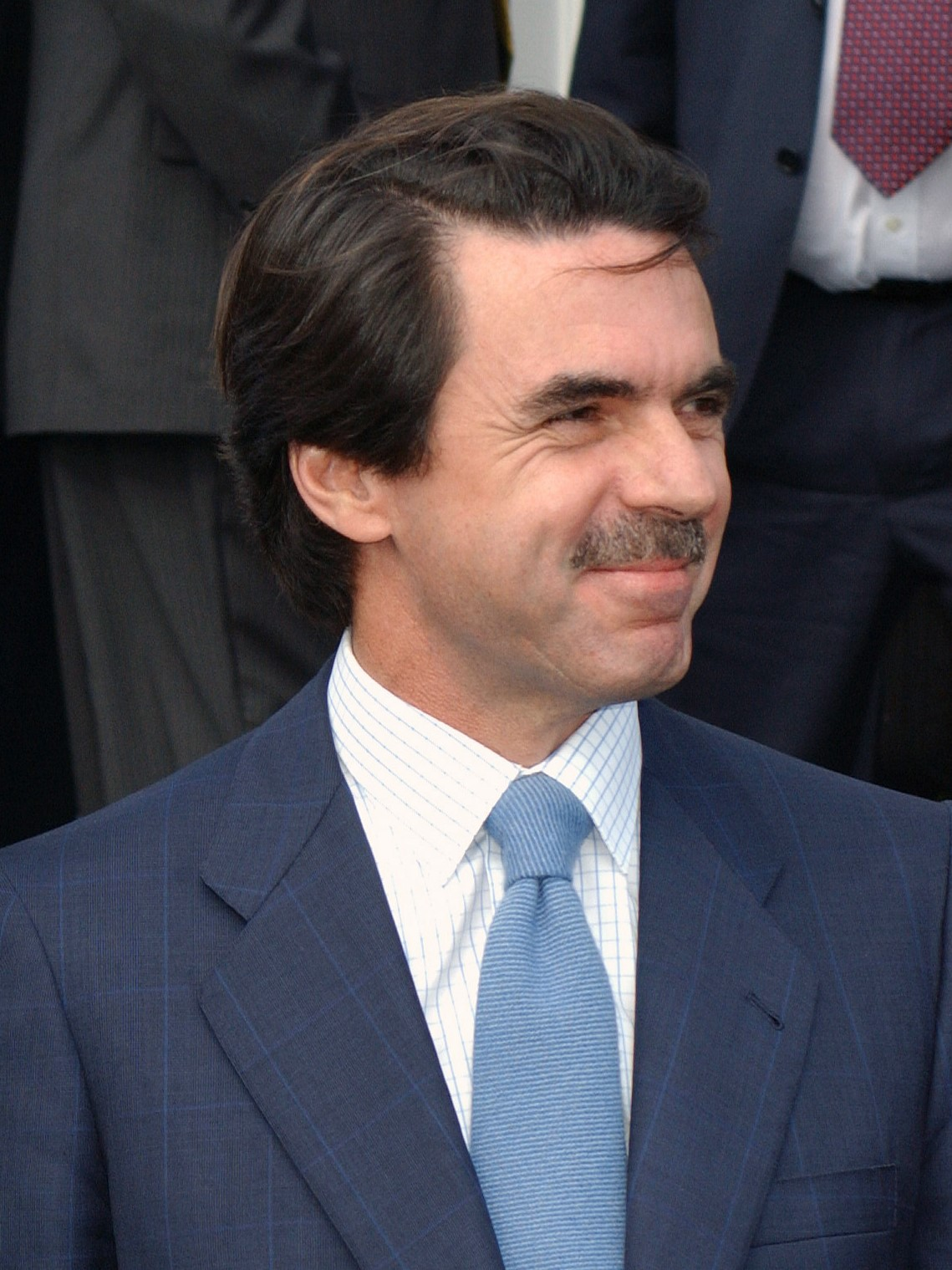
José María Aznar

Until the late 1990s in Spain the term revisionismo histórico was applied to various historiographic debates abroad, often though not always related to Nazism. It was seldom used against the local background and its denotation could have varied, e.g. in 1988 the expression was employed to stand for scientific historiography. According to scholars who later confronted revisionism, this general setting changed in the mid-1990s; the new government of José María Aznar launched a bid to revise the dominant historiographic view of the recent past. In administrative terms the scheme was embodied e.g. in Plan de Mejora de la Enseñanza, a scheme aimed at re-design of the school curriculum, in 1997 proposed to the Cortes and eventually rejected. In parallel the Right-wing administration mounted a public-discourse counter-offensive, which climaxed in "Operación Moa". Its supposed result was commercial success of 3 books which appeared on the market between 1999 and 2003; written by an amateur historian and journalist Pio Moa, they focused on the Second Republic and the Civil War.

Moa's books triggered adverse response. It was first embodied in a 1999 manifesto titled Combate por la historia; signed by historians, writers and public figures, it was the first to apply the term "revisionistas" to a group of unnamed Spanish historians, charged with distortions and falsifications. In the early 21st century the name filtered into newspapers and the phenomenon became a widely discussed topic, especially that also other books charged with revisionism were selling very well. According to some scholars, the second term of the Aznar government reinforced the revisionist efforts, expressed e.g. as another education plan advanced by Real Academia de Historia. The anti-revisionist backlash climaxed in 2005–2006 as 3 books produced by professional historians and edited by Alberto Reig Tapia and Francisco Espinosa Maestre; the volumes supposedly definitely dismantled the revisionist Moa narrative and at the time they were thought to have terminated the debate.

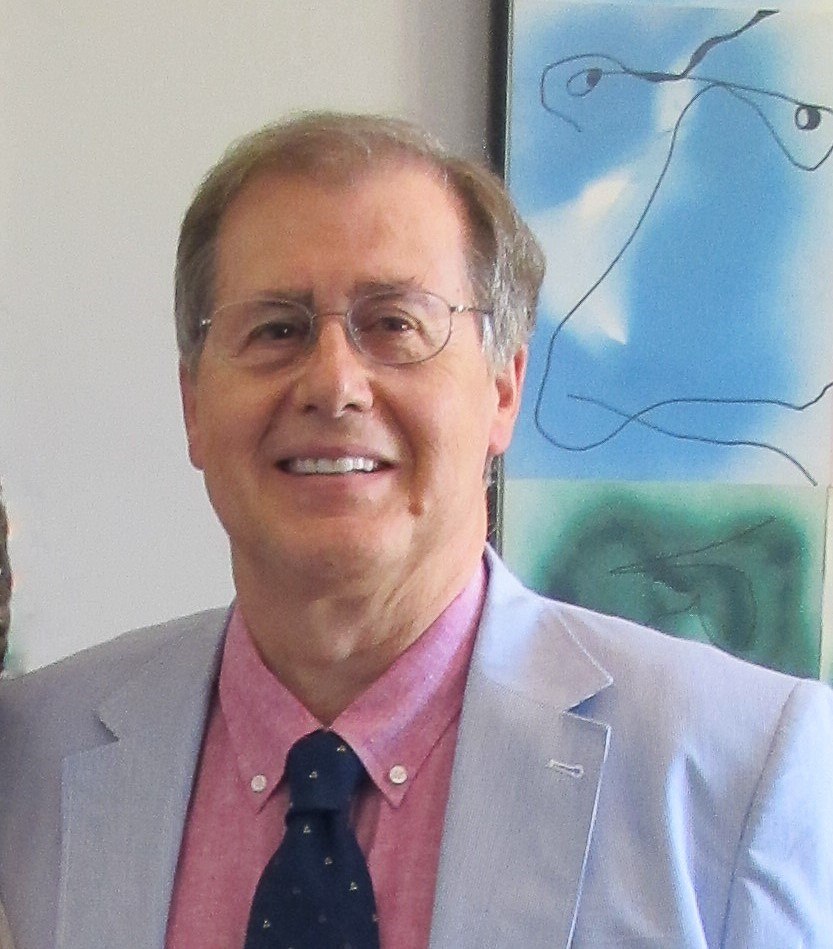
Alberto Reig Tapia

Instead of dying out, after 2005 the debate on revisionism flamed on and was brought to another level. To some extent sustained by adoption of Ley de la Memoria Historica in 2007, the discussion transformed when a group of professional historians challenged the anti-revisionists; from that moment onwards the conflict was no longer between amateurs and scholars, but between the scholars themselves. It reached another milestone in 2010–2011, the years when Manuel Álvarez Tardío and Roberto Villa García published a general work on the Second Republic and when RAH-edited Diccionario Biográfico Español published a biography of Francisco Franco. The latter caused heated controversy mostly in popular discourse; according to many, the biography was revisionist and scandalous. The former had a low-profile but more lasting effect, and became a negative point of reference for many works confronting revisionist historiography. The discussion on revisionism kept escalating and assumed increasingly militant tone. The next milestone was reached when in 2014 Stanley G. Payne published his biography of Franco (co-authored by Jesús Palacios Tapias); at that point some concluded that revisionism was embraced by the world's most distinguished Hispanists. Since then the debate has reached an unprecedented level and spilled over to global historiography. It is also reflected in 2018 debates related to proposal of a new Ley de Memoria Histórica.

== Name and beyond ==
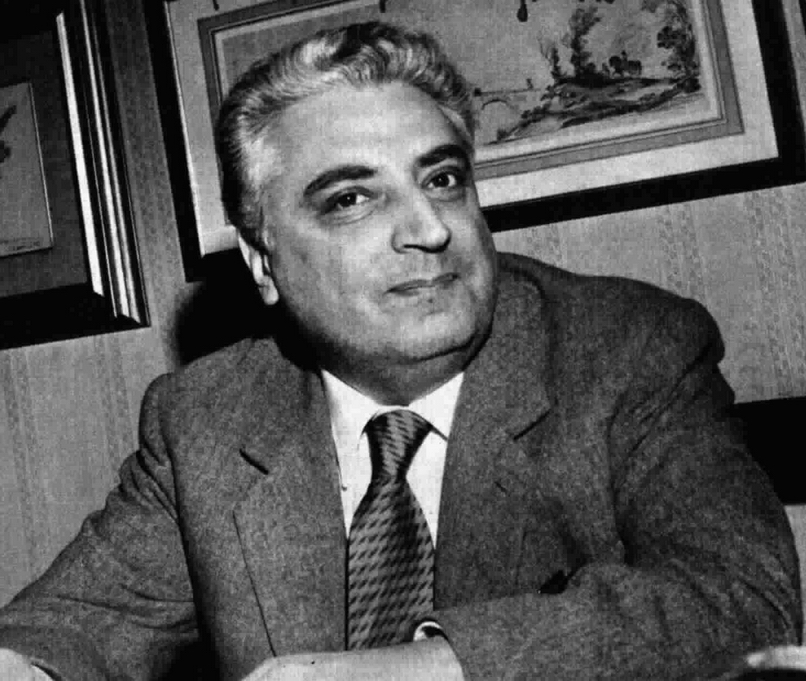
Renzo de Felice

Some scholars who confront the revisionist tide claim that the term "revisionism" as such is not by default deprecatory and some authors considered champions of anti-revisionism declare themselves revisionists, naming skepticism a recommended historiographic approach. They note that authors who strive to re-write history of Spain of the 20th century do not actually deserve the name of "revisionist" and should rather be called manipulators and liars; they are dubbed "self-proclaimed revisionists". Others reserve the term for intellectuals like de Felice, Nolte, Lachmann or Furet and underline that the likes of Moa or Vidal are nowhere near their stature. There are authors who agree that the name has been abused and label their opponents rather as "pseudo-revisionists". Finally, some scholars distinguish between "revisionism", the term reserved for amateurish writings of Moa or others, and "neo-revisionism", the term applied to scientifically grounded works pursuing similar yet not identical views. Finally, few authors note that historiographic revision is generally welcome and needed, but "revisionism" by default stands for revision based on manipulation and has no place in the academic realm.

Most authors who rebuke attempts to distort and falsify history do not go into such detail and refer to "revisionismo histórico" and "revisionistas". The name denotes an attempt to revise a generally accepted, proven scientific version of recent Spanish history and is applied to both "historiadores coyunturales" and "historiadores profesionales"; recently the term is applied not only to professionals in historiographic science but also to scholars who until their "enigmatic evolution" had been global icons of scientific Hispanism. Sometimes in such cases the term is qualified as perfectly respectable scientific "revisionismo amable", yet usually no such distinction is made. At times revisionism is divided into purist and comparative branches. Sometimes two labels associated are "denialism" and "negationism", as the authors in question deny or negate generally accepted and supposedly proven historiographic concepts.

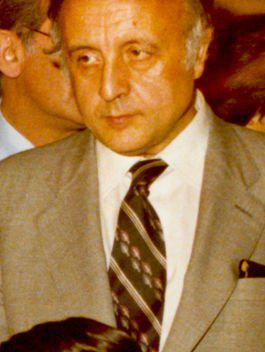
Ricardo de la Cierva

Though authors classified as revisionists are typically charged with nurturing post-Francoist, pro-Francoist, neo-Francoist, quasi-Francoist or plainly Francoist sentiments, some effort is made to distinguish between "Francoist historiography" and "revisionist historiography". The former is deemed actually orthodox in its Francoist set of old-style schemes and traits, immune to discourse, straight continuation of pre-1975 narrative and represented by authors of older generation like Ricardo de la Cierva, Vicente Palacio Atard and Fernando Vizcaíno Casas. The latter is deemed to be a confrontational response to historiographic vision generally agreed after 1975. It is at times pictured as a school represented by a new generation of authors often armed with modern scientific tools, some of these authors skilled if not excelling – this is, until they embraced revisionism - in historiographic craft. It is only recently that in course of increasingly heated debate less and less attention is paid to tell Francoist historians from revisionist historians. Both groups might be bundled together, many threads and motives are supposed to prove continuity of their historiographic vision, and revisionism is painted as "almost 'Blue'". Some critics of revisionism go even further and claim that it is actually an orthodox Francoist reading of history.

== Works questioned ==
There are some 10-15 books which come up repeatedly as negative points of reference of the anti-revisionist discourse, though further volumes might be referred less frequently or even occasionally. They roughly fall into two different categories.One is composed of loose essays, formatted for non-specialized reader and deprived of back matter, which usually forms part of scientific apparatus; this is the case of volumes published by Moa, Vidal, Martín Rubio or others. Another one is composed of fully fledged historiographic studies aimed for more experienced if not professional audience; this is the case of books published by Álvarez Tardío, Villa García, del Rey Reguillo or others. Works from both categories most frequently charged with revisionism are listed below, precedence given to volumes which stand most prominently as key vehicles of revisionist narrative.

30 works most often referred to as revisionist
Pio Moa, Los mitos de la Guerra Civil, Madrid 2003, ISBN 9788497340939
Manuel Álvarez Tardío, Roberto Villa García, El precio de la exclusión. La política durante la Segunda República, Madrid 2010, ISBN 9788499200309
Stanley G. Payne, Jesús Palacios, Franco. A Personal and Political Biography, London 2014, ISBN 9780299302108
Fernando del Rey Reguillo (ed.), Palabras como puños: la intransigencia política en la Segunda República Española, Madrid 2011, ISBN 9788430952175
Alfonso Bullón de Mendoza, Luis Eugenio Togores (eds.), Revisión de la Guerra Civil Española, Madrid 2002, ISBN 9788497390002
Manuel Álvarez Tardío, Fernando del Rey Reguillo (eds.), El laberinto republicano: la democracia española y sus enemigos (1931-1936), Madrid 2012, ISBN 9788490063576
Gabriele Ranzato, La grande paura del 1936. Come la Spagna precipitó nella guerra civile, Bari 2011, ISBN 9788842096474
César Vidal, Paracuellos Katyn. Un ensayo sobre el genocidio de la izquierda, Madrid 2005, ISBN 9788496088320
Angel David Martín Rubio, Los mitos de la represión en la Guerra Civil, Baracaldo 2005, ISBN 9788496899636
José Manuel Macarro Vera, Socialismo, república y revolución en Andalucia (1931-1936), Sevilla 2000, ISBN 9788447205998
Roberto Villa García, Manuel Álvarez Tardío, 1936. Fraude y violencia en las elecciones del Frente Popular, Madrid 2017, ISBN 9788467049466
Stanley G. Payne. El colapso de la República. Los orígenes de la guerra civil (1933-1936), Madrid 2005, ISBN 9788497343275
Manuel Álvarez Tardío, El camino a la democracia en España. 1931 y 1978, Madrid 2005, ISBN 9788493465834
Fernando del Rey Reguillo, Paisanos en lucha. Exclusión política y violencia en la Segunda República española, Madrid 2008, ISBN 9788497429047
Pio Moa, Los origines de la Guerra Civil Española, Madrid 1999, ISBN 9788474905267
Julius Ruiz, The ‘Red Terror’ and the Spanish Civil War. Revolutionary Violence in Madrid, Cambridge 2014, ISBN 9781107682931
César Vidal, Francisco Jiménez Losantos, Historia de España, vol. III: De la Restauración bórbonica hasta el primer franquismo, Barcelona 2010, ISBN 9788408094593
Angel David Martín Rubio, Paz, Perdón... y Verdad: La represión en la guerra civil. Una sintesis definitiva, Toledo 1999, ISBN 8488787162
Gabriele Ranzato, El eclipse de la democracia. La Guerra Civil española (1936-1942), Madrid 2006, ISBN 9788432312489
José María Marco, Una historia patriótica de España, Barcelona 2013, ISBN 9788408112150
José Javier Esparza, El terror rojo en España, Madrid 2007, ISBN 9788496840041
Mercedes Gutiérrez Sánchez, Diego Palacios Cerezales (eds.), Conflicto político, democracia y dictadura, Madrid 2007, ISBN 9788425913761
Pio Moa, El derrumbe de la segunda república y la guerra civil, Madrid 2001, ISBN 9788474906257
César Vidal, Checas de Madrid, Barcelona 2007, ISBN 9788467445640
Bartolomé Bennassar, El infierno fuimos nosotros. La guerra civil española (1936-1942...), Madrid 2005, ISBN 9788430605873
Alfonso Bullón de Mendoza, José Calvo Sotelo, Barcelona 2004, ISBN 9788434467187
José María Zavala, Los gángsters de la Guerra Civil, Barcelona 2007, ISBN 9788483462881
Juan Blazquez Miguel, España turbulenta: alteraciones, violencia y sangre durante la II República, Madrid 2007, ISBN 9788493299477
Alfonso Bullón de Mendoza, Luis Eugenio Togores Sánchez (eds.), La República y la Guerra Civil setenta años después, Madrid 2008, ISBN 9788497390705
Enrique Sacanell, El general Sanjurjo, héroe y victima. El militar que pudo evitar la dictadura franquista, Madrid 2004, ISBN 9788497342056

== Charge: re-fried Francoist fables ==
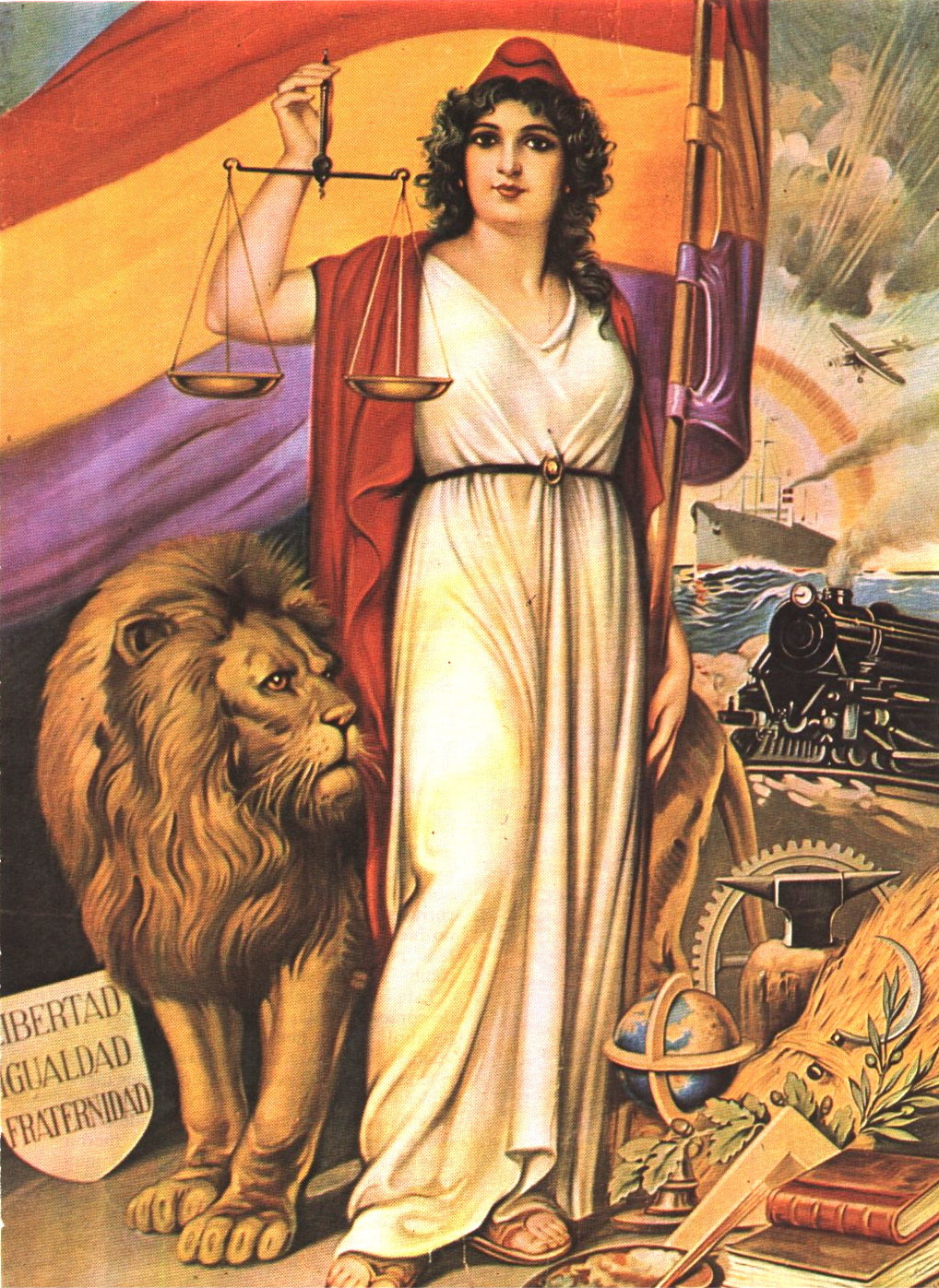
allegory of the Republic

The debate is centred on the Second Republic and to some extent on the Civil War, though occasionally also Restoration period or Francoism might come under scrutiny. A thesis initially advanced by anti-revisionist scholars was that after 1975 "mayoritario sector" of Spanish historiography agreed a propaganda-free opinion on the Republic and that in post-Francoist Spain there was no ideologically motivated "war of historians"; revisionists were marked as these who tried to open such a war. Recently this position has changed and some anti-revisionists admit that indeed there might be some "areas of contention" and controversies, embodied in a debate between these who denounce "false orthodox canon" and these who denounce "revisionism". However, many authors keep flagging revisionism as a social rather than historiographic phenomenon.

Revisionists are considered to be motivated by a desire to defame the Republic; their key thesis is that the Civil War was caused by the Left. This underlying bottom message is reportedly sustained by a number of more detailed concepts. One critic listed them in an ironic "decalogue of the revisionist": 1) pretend scientific neutrality; 2) disregard "structural history"; 3) try to demythologize the Republic; 4) present the Republic as exclusion; 5) blame the Left for radical revolutionism; 6) deny CEDA’s role of a Fascist Trojan horse; 7) claim that Bienio negro was not so black; 8) underline that violence was equal on both sides; 9) criticize memoria historica as having nothing to do with history; 10) glorify the transition, made possible by Francoism.

Historians called revisionists are typically refused scientific credentials, denied both to relatively young scholars and to academic Hispanists who established their position during decades. Some are presented as interested in selling books rather than in historical rigor. The charge raised most frequently is that instead of establishing the truth their aim is to dismantle "liberal-left myths". Since they are not honest they do not qualify as scientists, even though they very much pretend so and constantly raise claims to a myth of scientific "objectivity" and "impartiality", qualities which they are also denied. The revisionists reportedly lack "modus operandi propiamente historiográfico", fail "to provide a balanced assessment", demonstrate bias, distort history, resort to "pseudo-scientific" methods, manipulation and deliberate falsification, create new myths, tend to be hysterical and cultivate their own "pedagogics of hate". An index of manipulative techniques used by the revisionists contains 5 key methods: 1) use of logical fallacies; 2) relativisation, reductionism and negationism; 3) mystification; 4) psychologization and 5) mythologization.

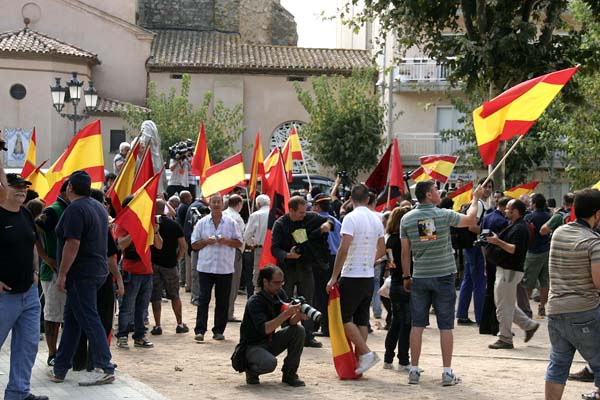
Rally of Falange in contemporary Spain

The revisionist authors are "in the service of the political aims of the present", their goal identified as to "whitewash the history of the Spanish right" and to cover up Nationalist crimes. They are linked to a range of political options and might be dubbed "historiographic Right", "conservatives", "neo-Conservatives", "theo-conservatives", "ultraconservatives", "conservative/neo-Francoist", "pro-Francoists", "filofranquistas", "regime's panegyrists and ideologized 'historians'", "Francoist apologists" and "authoritarians". They are charged with exalting "pure Francoism", sustaining "canon neofranquista", "peddling discredited historical narrative", "repackaging the legends of Francoist ‘historiography’", serving "re-fried Francoist fables", "almost 'Blue'" myths and even nurturing "filonazismo". The charges are supposed proven by political membership of some historians, their publications in right-wing periodicals or publishing houses, links to right-wing institutions, their set of "ideological bedmates" or who they dined with. At times their presence in public discourse is cast against the background of Holocaust denial and revisionism being punishable by law in countries like Germany.

== Key conflicting theories ==
Thesis presented as:
"Orthodox"	"Revisionist"
Second Republic was a standard parliamentary democratic regime of the time	Second Republic was tilted towards the Left, exclusive, and its democratic character was seriously flawed
Republic was from the onset threatened principally by Right-wing conspiracy	During its lifetime, the Republic was assaulted by the Right and by the Left
PSOE was one of major constitutional forces of the Republic	PSOE viewed the Republic as a transitory regime, to be followed by some sort of popular democracy
CEDA was an authoritarian party bent on toppling the Republic	CEDA in principle remained loyal to the Republican regime
republican politicians like Azaña by their moderate attitude contributed to stability of the regime	republican politicians like Azaña by their sectarian attitude contributed to deterioration of the regime
radicalisation of politics during the Republic was caused principally by the Right-wing refusal to recognize the regime	radicalisation of politics during the Republic was caused principally by the Left-wing claim to ownership of the regime
1934 rising in Asturias was directed against the Right and remained an uncontrolled outbreak of Left-wing violence	1934 rising in Asturias was directed against the Republic and formed a revolutionary prelude to the Civil War
1936 elections were clearly won by the Popular Front and minor irregularities had no tangible impact on the outcome	1936 elections were subject to serious fraud and manipulation, which might have given Popular Front the Cortes majority
Popular Front government was like any other constitutional government	Popular Front government was a proto-revolutionary one
until the July coup state structures operated as usual	following the 1936 elections state structures imploded
there was no imminent threat of Left-wing revolution in the early summer of 1936	in the early summer of 1936 the Republic was about to be converted into a revolutionary dictatorship
Republic collapsed because it was assaulted by the Right	Republic collapsed because it was unable to provide political solution to Spanish structural problems
July coup resulted from fundamental Right-wing refusal to recognize the Republic	July coup was provoked by the Left
in July 1936 the military intended to topple the Republic and set up an authoritarian or totalitarian regime	in July 1936 the military intended to topple the Popular Front government and re-define the Republican regime
Republic continued to exist after the July coup	the regime which emerged after the July coup was no longer the Second Republic
Spanish democracy endured until March 1939	Spanish democracy collapsed in the spring of 1936
Left-wing violence during the Civil War was reactive, spontaneous, bottom-up and opposed by the state	Left-wing violence during the Civil War was heavily related to new format adopted by the state, it was largely organized and instigated by official structures
Left-wing violence and Right-wing violence during the Civil War are uncomparable as they were distinct in structure and scale	Left-wing violence and Right-wing violence during the Civil War are comparable
violence in the Republican zone was a measure of self-defense	violence in the Republican zone was a measure of revolutionary terror
Nationalist regime emerging during the Civil War was a fascist one	unqualified identification of the emerging Nationalist regime with fascism is an unacceptable oversimplification
in essence, the Spanish Civil War was a struggle between democracy and dictatorship	in essence, the Spanish Civil War was a struggle between revolution and counter-revolution

== Counter-charge: República no fue Caperucita Roja ==
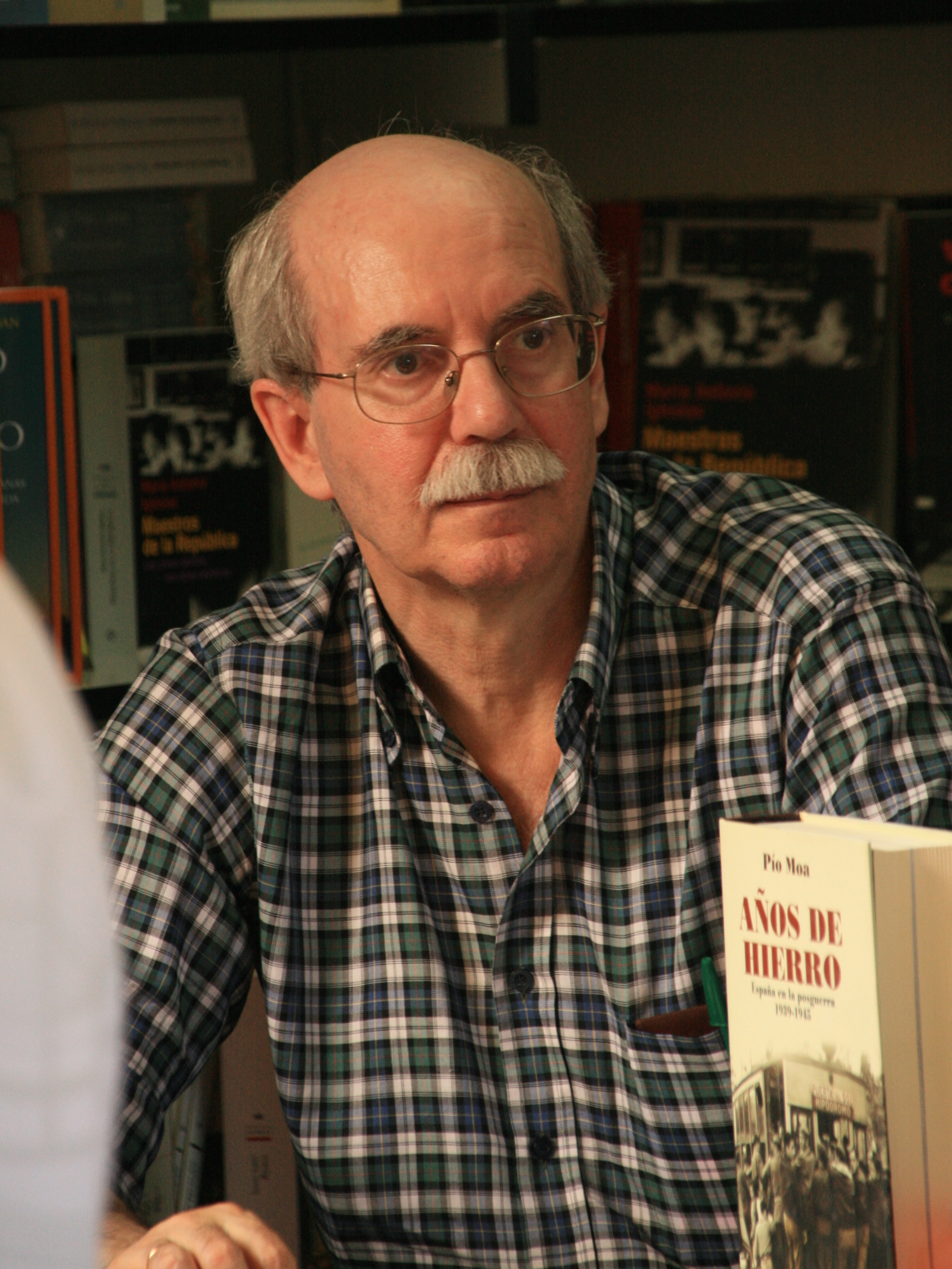
Pio Moa

Authors referred to as revisionists do not adopt a uniform stand. Some implicitly accept the label since they openly format their works as challenge to alleged "myths", reportedly prevailing in historiography. Some joined the anti-revisionist campaign and turned from iconic revisionists to iconic anti-revisionists. Some ignore the term and do not take part in direct polemics. Some assumed a combative position and in numerous articles, press statements and books they confront their opponents. There are authors dubbed revisionists who deny having anything in common with other "revisionists" and treat them in a derogatory manner, there are authors who admit sharing similar views. In general, they question existence of an orthodox, generally accepted historiographic vision of the Republic and claim that historiography is about debate and plurality of opinions. On this basis they maintain that no such thing as revisionism exists, that the term is artificial construction which bundles together various scholars and opinions, and that by means of similar arbitrary judgments even icons of anti-revisionism like Preston might be counted in. A somewhat sympathetic term alternative to "revisionism" is "Moaist revolution".

There is no name commonly applied to scholars who criticize supposed revisionism, though some coined the term "contrarrevisionismo". They are at times referred to as "pequeño grupo de historiadores" who intend to monopolize the discourse by means of social, political and infrastructural network they had built. To this end, they allegedly attempt to stigmatize all these who do not comply as pseudo-scientists, busy with dirty political agenda and not deserving a place in academic discourse. The anti-revisionist authors are presented as driven by their own prejudice, ideologically motivated, "politically committed" and named "small group of historians determined to defend at all costs the vision of a sacred and ‘heroic’ republican democracy". Their supposed political sympathies are clearly described as Left-wing, with references to "historiografía ‘progresista’", "nueva [progressist] religión civil", "anti-Fascist historiography", "political correctness", "post-Marxist ideology", "militant history" and "anti-Francoist, progressive historians". Their principal objective is described as further mythologization of the Republic; this stand is ironically referred by remarks that "Republic was not a Little Red Riding Hood".

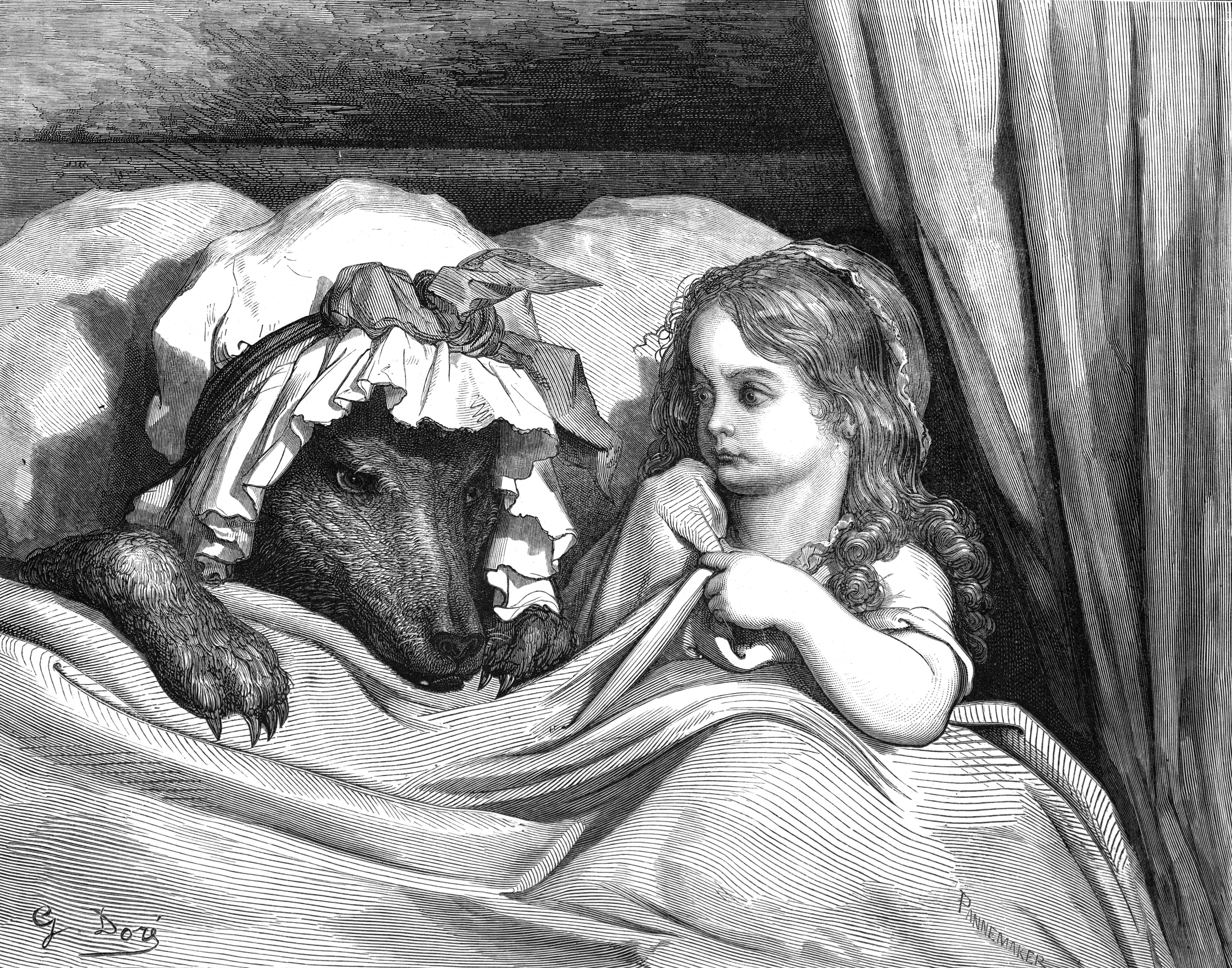
ridiculing counter-revisionists: the Right and the Spanish Republic?

Some revisionist authors take charges of their supposed Francoist sympathies very seriously. They demand from periodicals which published such opinions the right to reply and require individuals advancing such claims to retract them; these demands usually produce no result except claims that by "threatening quasi-legal language" they intend to administratively limit free speech. They also claim to have never endorsed the regime and diagnose that though there might have been a modest post-Francoist revival in some sectors of the Spanish media, all professional historians remained immune. They reverse the charges and maintain that it is rather the "contrarrevisionistas" who demonstrate a Francoist heritage: unable of detaching science from politics, they reportedly view history in Manichean terms, refuse to acknowledge their analysis, and got locked in a schematic bi-polar logic. These revisionists attempt to reverse also other charges directed at them and similarly denounce their opponents in terms who they dine with and where they publish, e.g. by noting that one of the most militant anti-revisionists is related to a Trotskyite periodical. They use anti-intellectualism to attempt to ridicule the pose of moral superiority, reportedly assumed by those lambasting revisionism, and agonize about their alleged "personal smears".

== Notable proponents ==
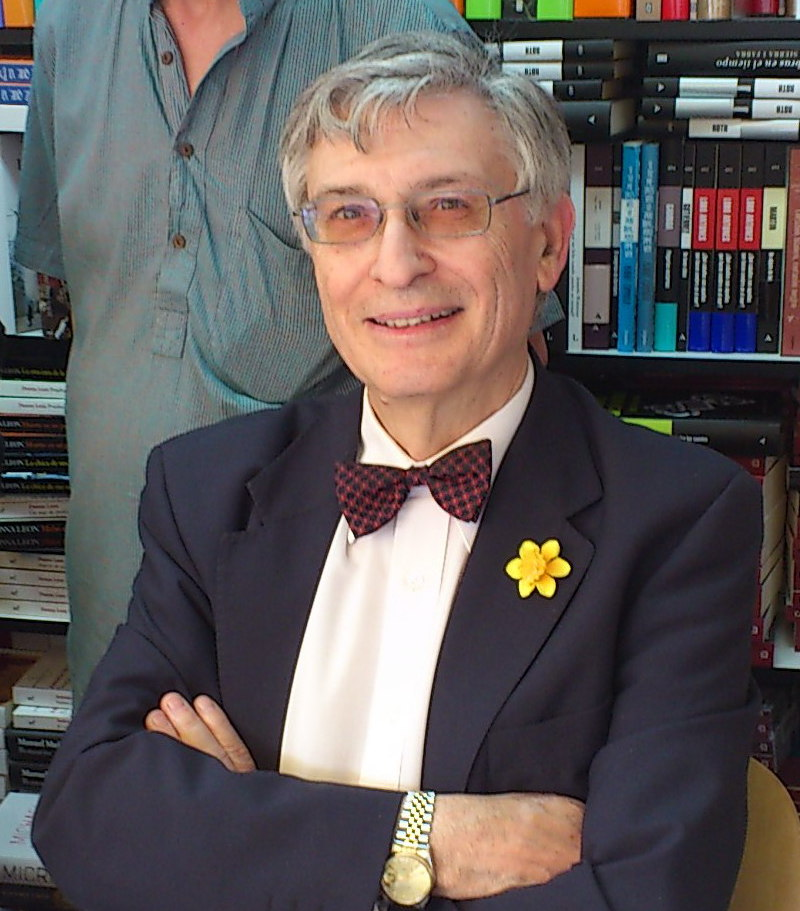
Ángel Viñas

currently active historians presented as:
	"orthodox"	"revisionist"
icon	Paul Preston	Stanley G. Payne
most combative, most often referred to	Alberto Reig Tapia Ángel Viñas Martín Francisco Espinosa Maestre Ricardo Robledo Hernández Chris Ealham Julián Casanova Ruiz Antonio Bernat Montesinos	Pio Moa Rodríguez Cesar Vidal Manzanares Fernando del Rey Reguillo Manuel Álvarez Tardío Roberto Villa García Julius Ruiz José María Marco
also counted in	Ignacio Peiró Martín Eduardo González Calleja Carlos Forcadell Álvarez Jorge Marco Carretero Alejandro Quiroga Fernández de Soto Francisco J. Rodríguez Jiménez Enrique Moradiellos García Michael Richards (es) Helen Graham Juan Carlos Losada Peter Anderson Joan Maria Thomàs José Luis Ledesma Vera Francisco Moreno Gómez José Luis Martín Ramos Julio Gil Pecharromán Francisco Sevillano Calero Diego Caro Cancela Xosé Manoel Núñez Seixas Ismael Saz Samuel Pierce Borja de Riquer i Permanyer Gutmaro Gómez Bravo Sebastian Balfour Glicerio Sánchez Recio Francisco Sánchez Pérez Sergio Riesco Roche	Luis Arranz Notario Gabriele Ranzato Ángel María Martín Rubio Gerald Blaney Jr Nigel Townson José Manuel Macarro Vera Carlos Seco Serrano Cesar Alcala Giménez Michael Seidman Pedro Carlos González Cuevas Luis Eugenio Togores Robert Stradling José Antonio Parejo Fernández Richard A. Robinson Federico Jiménez Losantos César Alonso de los Ríos Bartolomé Bennassar José Javier Esparza Torres Enrique Sacanell Ruiz Luis Suárez Fernández José María Zavala Juan Avilés Farré Juan Blázquez Miguel Gabriel Tortella Casares Jan Kieniewicz Gustavo Morales Delgado Marek Jan Chodakiewicz,
institutional outposts	University of Zaragoza Hispania Nova El País Journal of Contemporary History	FAES La Ilustración liberal RAH Revista Hispano-Cubana Catoblepas Editorial Encuentro

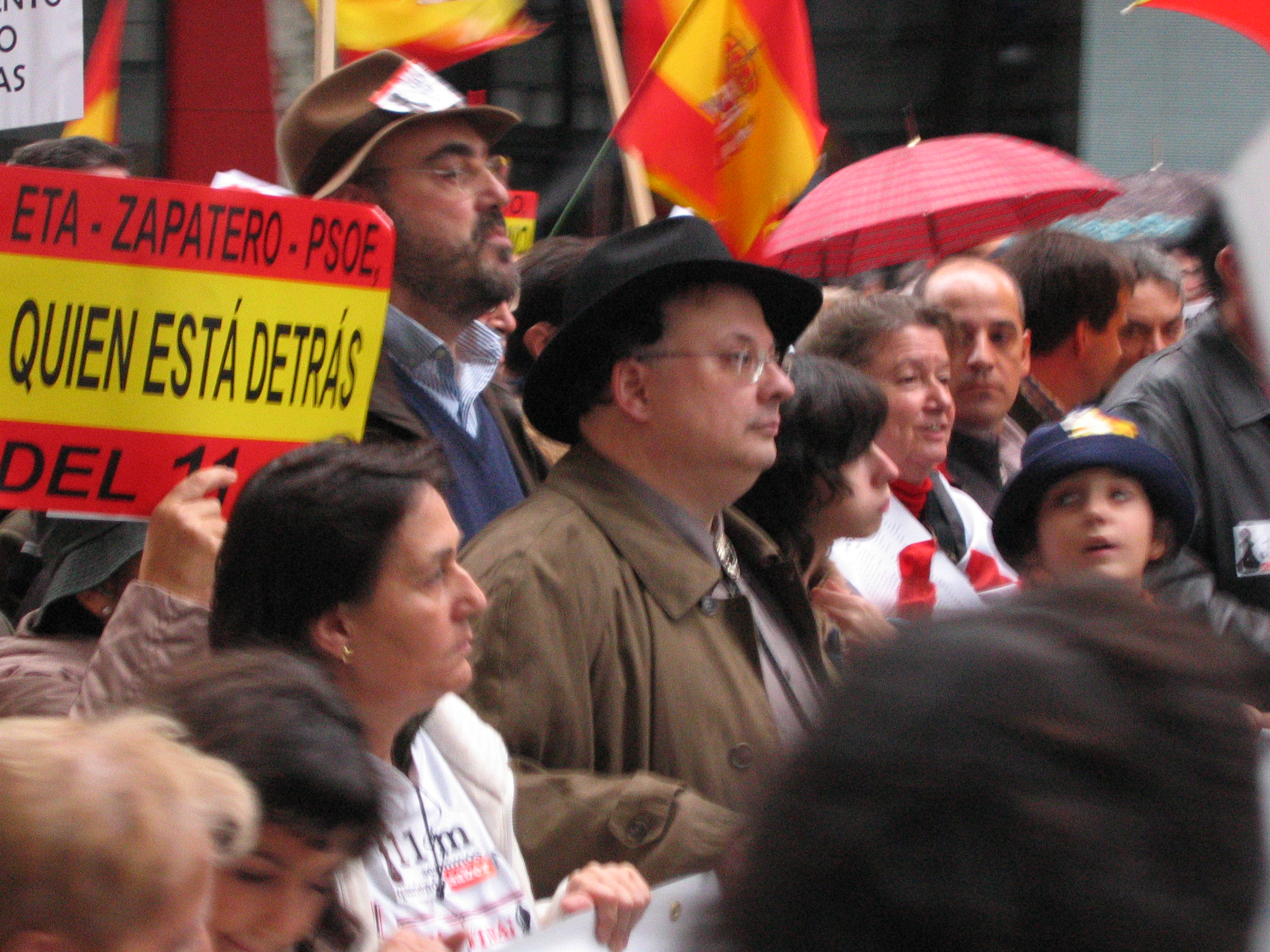
Cesar Vidal (in black hat)

== See also ==
- Historiography on Spanish Civil War repressions (numbers)
- Spanish transition to democracy
- Historical revisionism
  - Historical revision of the Inquisition
- Historiography
