= Historiography on Spanish Civil War repressions (numbers) =

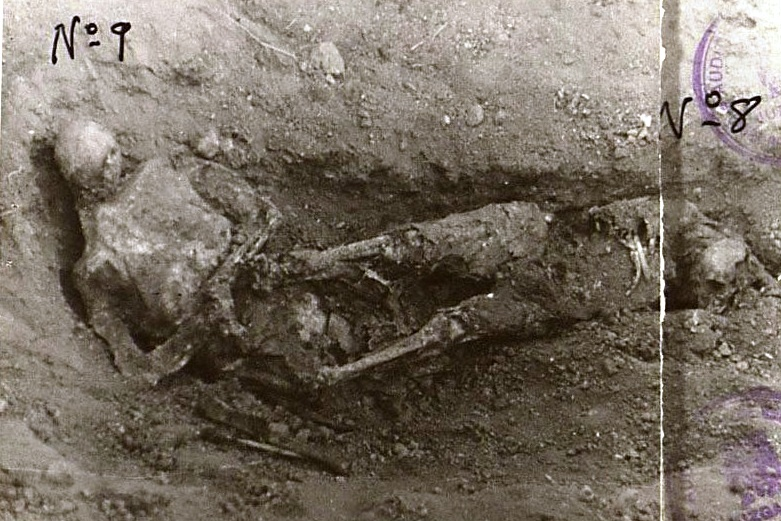
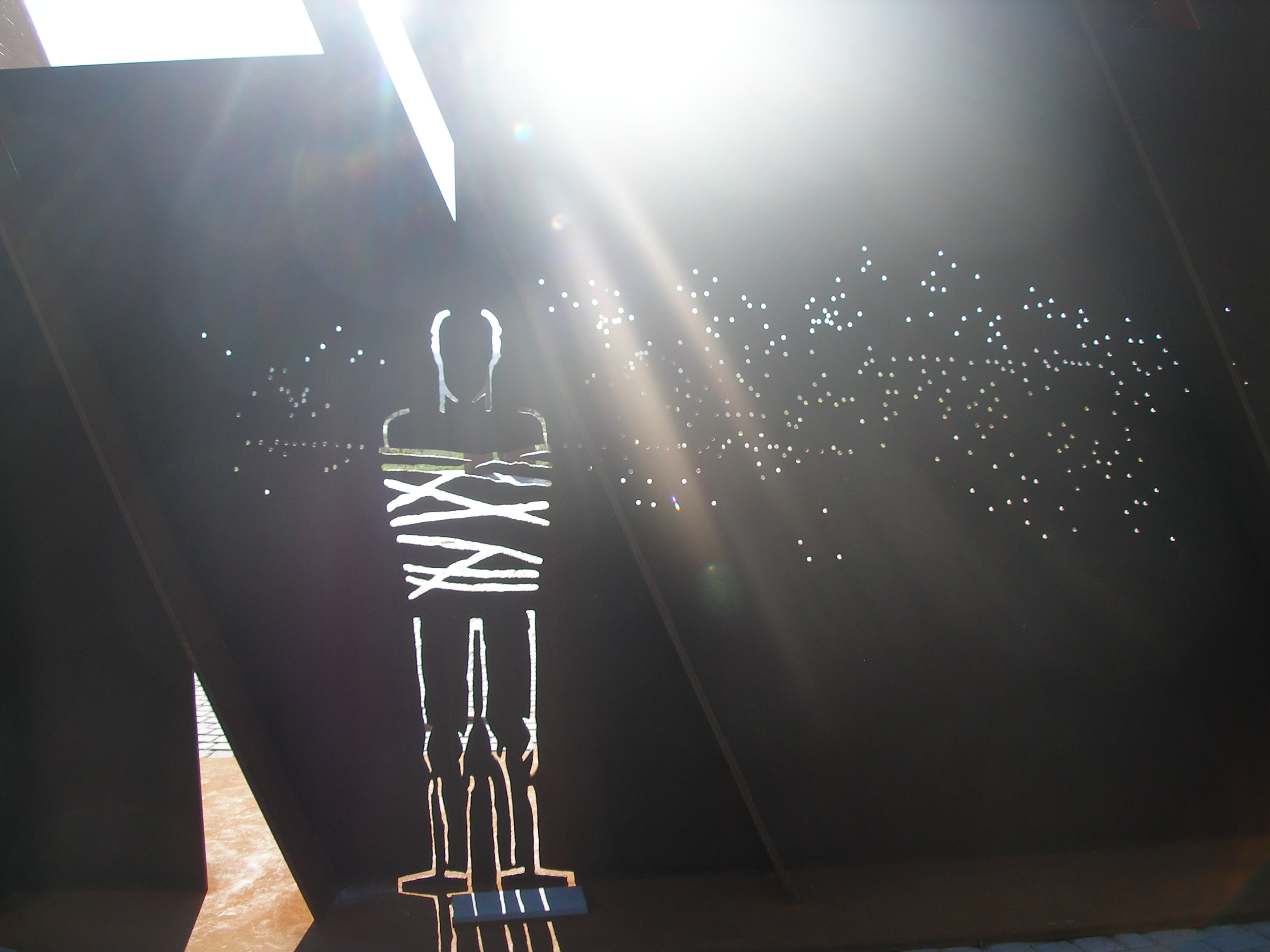
victims of Republican terror and monument to victims of Nationalist terror

Historiography on number of victims of the Spanish Civil War repressions is a scientific debate, which has been taking place among historians, and which concerns the question how many people were killed in wartime terror of both sides, the Nationalists and the Republicans, during the Spanish Civil War.

Apart from clearly propagandistic claims, from the onset there was no agreement in the academia, with discrepancies ranging (first Nationalist killings, then Republican ones, in thousands) from 40:60 to 200:20. In the mid-1970s the figures of 35:72 became particularly popular, either endorsed or contested. Since the late 1990s the ratio of 150:50 emerged as dominant, though it compared Francoist repression of 1936-1975 and Republican terror of 1936–1939. In the 21st century university scholars tend to approach wartime-only estimates as 100:50, yet beyond academia there might be widely different figures in circulation.

Apart from numbers, general historiographic debate on Spanish Civil War repression focuses also on many other threads, especially related to mechanisms of terror, its origins, its role and objectives, its nature, perpetrators, victims, institutional arrangements and other. Most of these threads are inter-related.

== 1940s and 1950s: Causa General and around ==
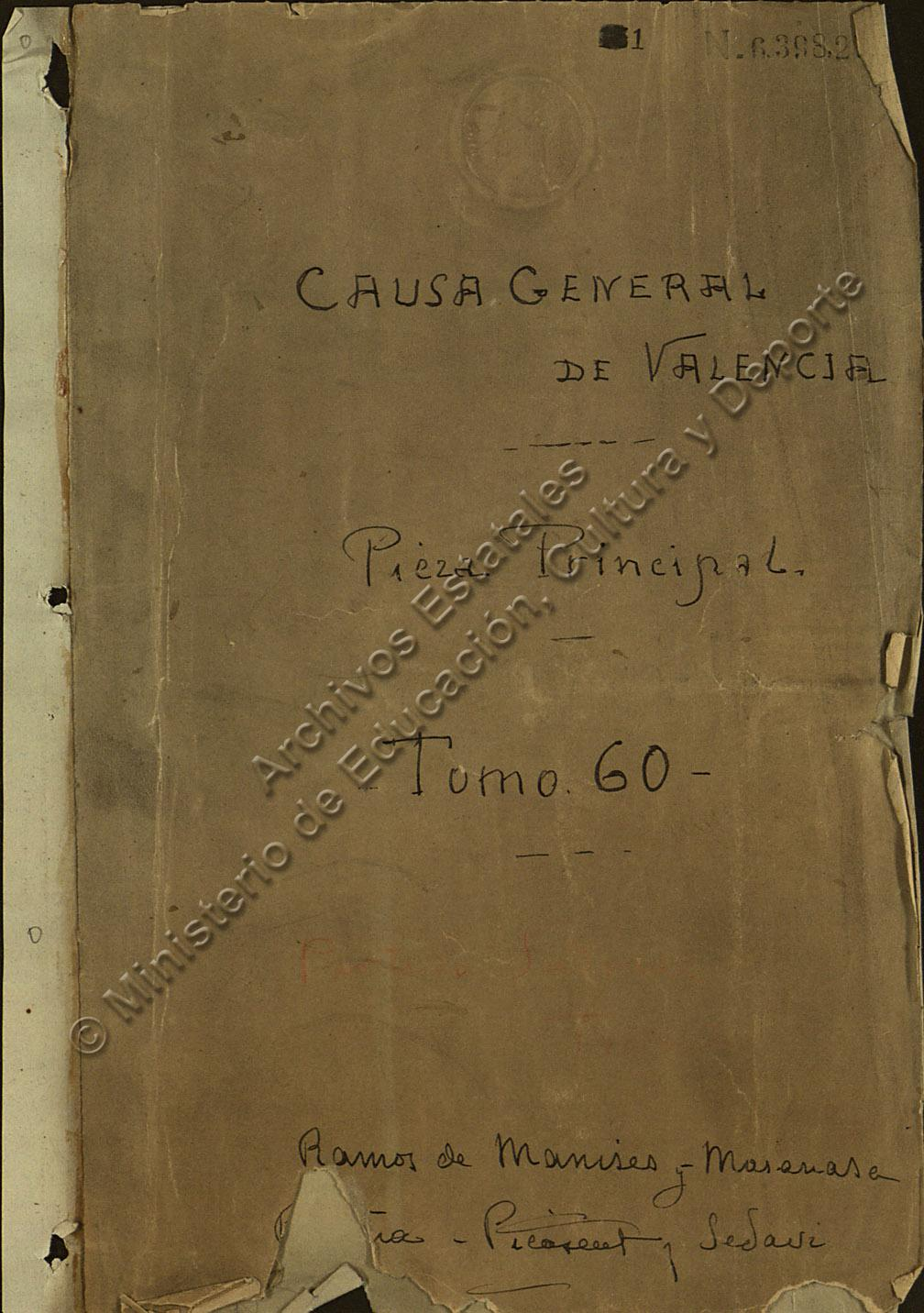
Causa General

Already during the war there were various numbers quantifying terror of both sides in circulation. However, they had little to do with historiography and fall rather into the propaganda rubric, as most were coined either by the warring parties or their supporters. Some inflated the figures beyond reason, e.g. on April 19, 1937, Francisco Franco declared that 470,000 people had already been murdered in the Republican zone. On the other hand, in 1940 the periodical issued by the Communist Party of the USA claimed that already 800,000 people had perished in the Francoist repression. Some of these figures, e.g. the claim of Ramón Sender that 750,000 left-wingers had been executed by mid-1938, were repeated even in the 1970s. Following the final Nationalist triumph the Madrid government set up a massive investigation program, which came to be known as Causa General; its purpose was to document Republican atrocities. The work grew to enormous scale. Eventually when in 1942 presenting their findings to the Minister of Justice, formally responsible for the investigation, the authors of this collective work arrived at the figure of 85,940 wartime Republican rearguard killings. However, in huge résumé publications based on Causa General, issued every some time in Spain since 1943, this figure has been omitted; present-day historians speculate that Franco was disappointed and considered the figure to be too low. One scholar maintains that it remained so "for over a quarter of a century", yet the first identified publication of the 85,940 figure - though referred as a well-documented minimum, perhaps subject to revisions upwards following further research - appeared in another version of the Causa General résumé, published in 1961. At times there were even lower figures advanced, not necessarily official yet at least allowed to be floated in public space, e.g. 54,594 as stated in the newly refurbished national sanctuary in Valladolid. However, in the press the figure was rather revised upwards, e.g. to 415,000 (1946); also historians declared higher figures, e.g. José Díaz de Villegas claimed 140,000 victims of terror rojo.

== 1960s: between Thomas and Jackson ==
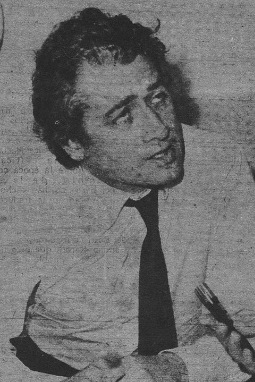
Hugh Thomas

Until the 1960s no independent scholarly estimates as to the Nationalist repression have been offered; in Francoist Spain it was a somewhat inconvenient topic, while émigré or foreign scholars did not have access to sources. Things changed following publication of first academic synthetic accounts of the Spanish Civil War, published by Hugh Thomas (1961) and Gabriel Jackson (1965). Both advanced their estimates and none of them provided any references as to basis of their calculation; Thomas noted merely "my considered belief" while Jackson trusted "my first four fingers" and embarked on some historiographic comparisons. Both scholars offered vastly different numbers. Thomas at one point explicitly declared 40,000 as a maximum for Nationalist repression and at another one estimated the total number of rearguard atrocities as 100,000, which implicitly left 60,000 for Republican killings. Jackson explicitly stated the number for "wartime Nationalist paseos and political reprisals" as 200,000, and this for "Republican zone paseos and political reprisals" as 20,000. Another major synthesis of the war, by Pierre Broué and Émile Témime (1961), did not offer any estimates; neither Herbert Southworth, in his well-known book intended to counter the Francoist propaganda (1963), advanced any figures, except a reference to 192,684 fatal victims of post-war repression. Hence, until the mid-1970s scholars had to find their own way between figures advanced by Causa General, Thomas and Jackson; e.g. Stanley G. Payne initially (1967) pointed to Jackson and assumed that "number of Nationalist executions exceeded those carried out by the left"; 5 years later he was more specific and estimated that "the White terror may have slain 50,000, perhaps fewer, during the war", and that the number of victims of the Nationalist repression was "undoubtedly greater" than the number of those killed by the Republicans (not specified, with the Madrid-advanced figure of 61,000 "not subject to objective verification"). Raymond Carr in his synthesis (1973) merely referred (incorrectly) vastly different estimates of Thomas and Jackson, without opting for any.

== 1970s and 1980s: Salas Larrazábal, pro and contra ==
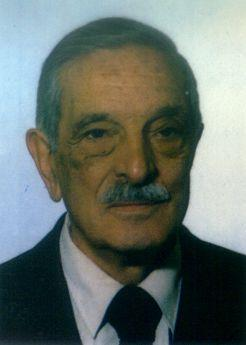
Ramón Salas

Another historiographic milestone was reached in 1977, already during the Spanish transition to democracy, when Ramón Salas Larrazábal published in Barcelona a 500-page book, titled Perdidas de la guerra. It was the first-ever monograph, intended to gauge the human cost of the Spanish Civil War. Published by a professional military historian, who spent all his career in Francoist armed forces, it was heavily based on Causa General, though also on other sources. The author offered a structured and systematic quantitative summary, which broke down war fatalities into various categories. The total for wartime "executions and murders" was reported as 108,000, with Nationalist terror responsible for 35,500 deaths and the Republican one for 72,500. Because of its systematic nature and the level of detail the work enjoyed considerable impact for almost 2 decades. The figures were also at times quoted abroad as the best that historiography could offer; in his monograph on the Franco regime (1987) Payne reversed his earlier suggestions and referred Salas' figures with few reservations, though he tended to prefer estimates of his brother Jesús Salas Larrazábal, once coined in a newspaper article and featuring 40,000 Nationalist killings and 60,000 Republican ones. However, other scholars did not agree; in the now democratic Spain some historians - most notably Alberto Reig Tapia - heavily criticised Salas' work as fundamentally flawed in terms of methodology. Ramón Tamames claimed (1977) 208,000 victims of Francoist terror (no estimates for the Republican one). Following another revision of his book, since the late 1970s Thomas - again with neither references nor rationale provided - also reversed his earlier estimates and started advancing a new set of figures, namely 75,000 victims of Nationalist terror and 55,000 victims of the Republican one; in the international historiography it became very popular if not prevailing, at least until the late 1990s.

== 1990s: early post-Francoist research ==
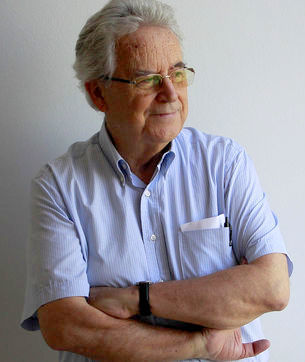
Santos Juliá

In the 1980s and 1990s numerous works of Spanish historians focused on repression in specific provinces or even specific comarcas; some of them achieved the status of "obra modélica" and almost all offered figures lower (in case of Republican) or higher (in case of Nationalist) than these advanced by Salas. A very important step as to approximation of the scale of terror was taken in 1996, in 2 joint works by Josep Maria Solé i Sabaté and Joan Villarroya i Font. In the volume which formed part of a monumental academic series on the history of Spain (1998), Javier Tusell cautiously endorsed their figures of 90,000 killed by the Nationalists and 55–60,000 killed by the Republicans. However, a professional yet non-academic historian Angel David Martín Rubio in what he claimed to be a "síntesis definitiva" (1997) came out with 53–58,000 killed by the Nationalists and 60,000 by the Republicans; the work became massively popular. The breakthrough volume was a collective publication edited by Santos Julia Díaz (1999), which summarised earlier local research. With 24 provinces (out of 50) scrutinized for Nationalist terror the total number of executions was 72,527; with 22 provinces scrutinized for Republican terror, the total was 37,843. On this basis the editors offered their overall estimates: they claimed that the total number of those killed by the Nationalists should be doubled, implicitly suggesting around 145,000, and that the number of those killed by the Republicans was probably around 50,000 (stated explicitly). The work edited by Julia proved extremely influential; one if its characteristic features, to persist during quarter of a century to come, was quantifying "Francoist repression" instead of "Nationalist repression". The result is that the Republican terror of 1936-1939 was getting compared to combined wartime and post-war terror of the Franco regime, at times up to 1975.

== 2000s: after Santos Juliá ==
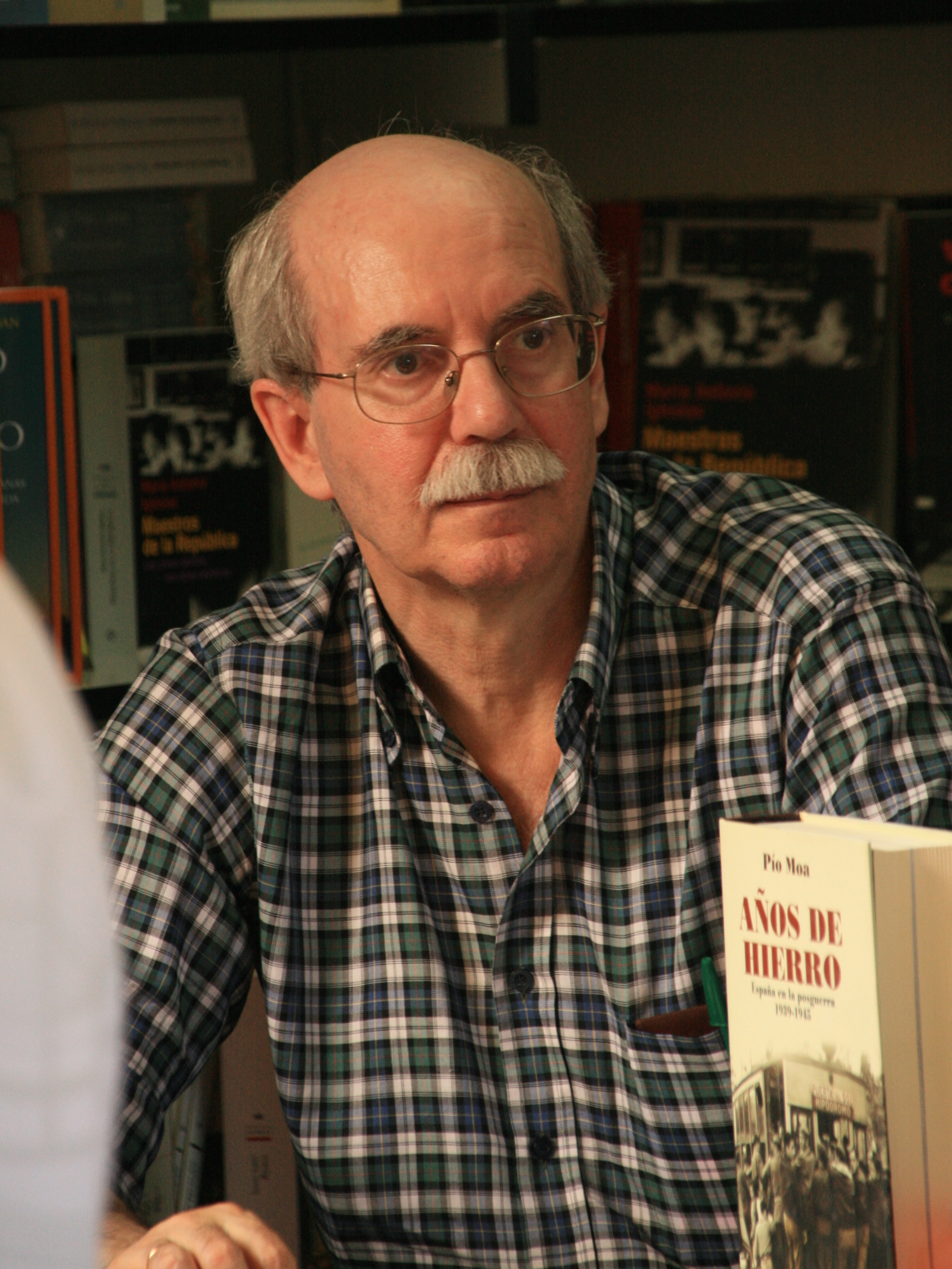
Pío Moa

In the 2000s numerous scientific works in Spain referred the Julia-edited volume as basically a statement which perhaps was not definitive, but eventually set the figures straight and introduced the ratio between two terrors which was unlikely to change; the 150 vs. 50 proportion started to dominate in historiography. However, some scholars advanced even wider discrepancy. In 2006 in his major work a British academic historian Paul Preston came out - not offering any specific references as to sources - with 180,000 Nationalist killings and 55,000 Republican ones. The same year Antony Beevor, another historian from Britain though catering to popular rather than scientific audience, sort of reverted to the ratio advanced by Jackson 40 years earlier. His take was 200,000 for the Nationalist terror and 35,000 for the Republican one; like Preston, he offered no specific references. Both works became massively popular, and the one by Beevor got translated into numerous foreign languages. Jean-François Berdah (2003) very cautiously advanced the proportion of 200:70. However, there were other vastly popular books which either claimed that the Nationalist vs. Republican gap was much more narrow, or that it did not exist at all. In terms of commercial success in Spain no book on the civil war is comparable to the one published by an amateur historian Pio Moa (2003). He did not advance his own figures, yet endorsed these by Martín Rubio (55,000 Nationalist killings, 60,000 Republican ones) as "más cercanos a la realidad", though he noted that they "parecen también excesivos". Calculations of Martín Rubio were endorsed also by distinguished hispanists, though when noting that "those ratios are probably as accurate as they can be made" Payne (2007) quoted 70,000 Nationalist and 60,000 Republican executions. Lesser-known academic historians like José Luis Orella (2005) advanced figures like 52,000 killings by the Nationalists and 57,000 by the Republicans. Some scholars in their synthetic summaries of the war preferred not to provide any figures at all.

== 2010s: around 150:50 ==
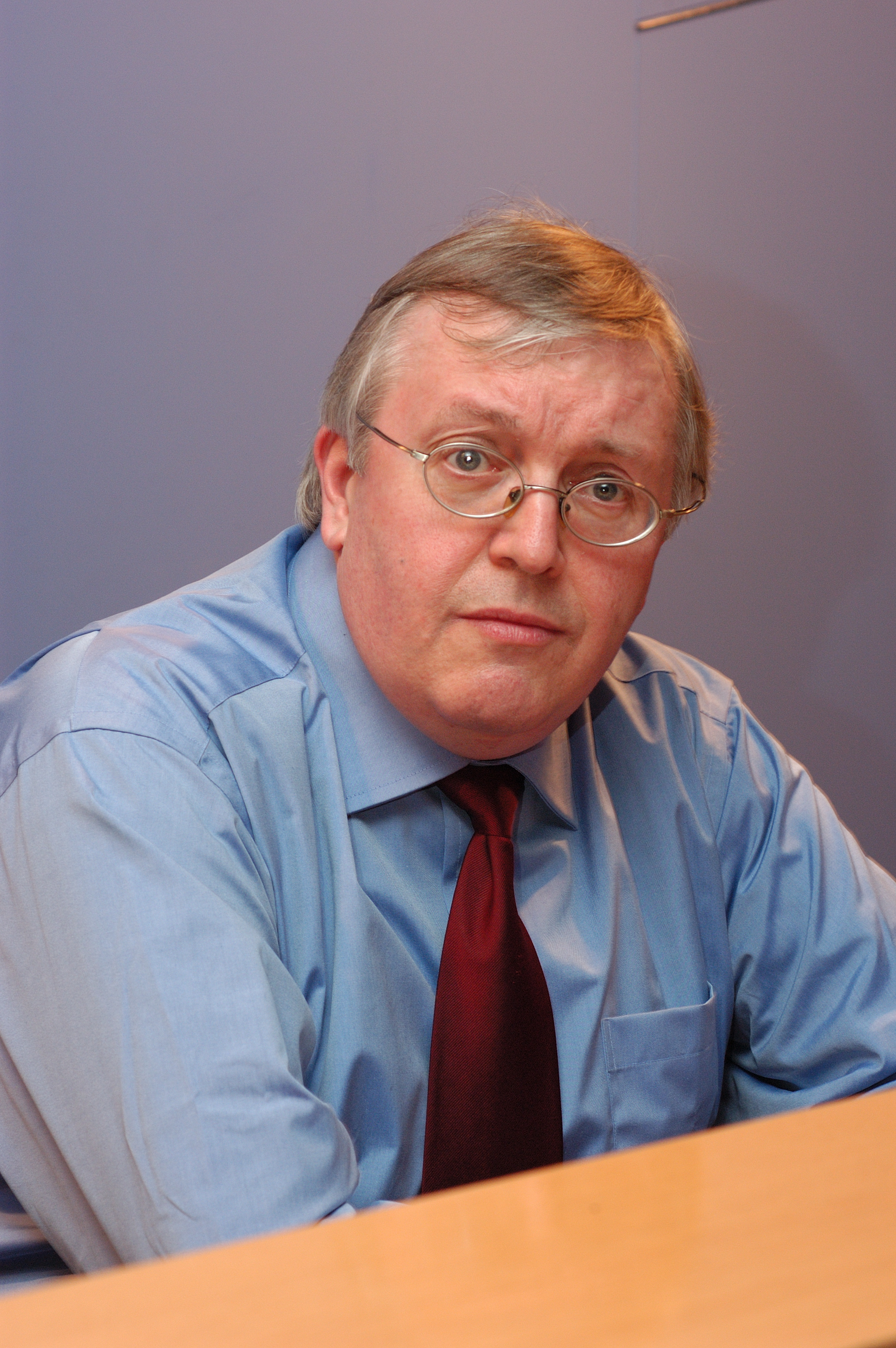
Paul Preston

The first decade of the 21st century is at times described as "el gran avance" in terms of researching the scale of wartime terror, with a spate of new detailed works focused on specific geographical areas. In the 2010s some scholars accepted the 150:50 extrapolations advanced in the Julia-edited volume of 1999, though at time without the reservation that they included also the post-war terror; this was the case e.g. of Francisco Romero Salvado, who in his dictionary (2013) claimed "at least" 150,000 Nationalist executions and 49,000 Republican ones. In a subsequent work (2011) Preston relinquished his earlier 180:50 proportion and also settled for the now-dominant 150:50. However, more and more works started to abandon this ratio and to scale down the gap between the two warring sides. The work of Francisco Espinosa Maestre (2010) re-stated the numbers as 130,199 for Nationalist repression (including post-war terror) and 49,272 for the Republican one. One of contributors to the Julia-edited work, an established academic Julian Casanova, in an English-language compendium by a prestigious British publisher (2013) suggested 100,000 killed by the Nationalists and 55,000 by the Republicans (war only). A young historian with his PhD dedicated to Republican violence, José Luis Ledesma, first (2009) endorsed 76,000 vs. 50,000 totals, and then (2014) re-stated them as 90,000 vs. 50,000. Payne, who over time kept re-working his numbers and has never accepted the 150:50 ratio, in another compendium by another prestigious British publisher (2012) with somewhat confusing maths settled for 70,000 Nationalist executions and 56,000 Republican ones. In 2012 a British-Spanish scholar Julius Ruiz when attempting a summary of historiographic output on repression (2012) opted for 100,000 killed by the Nationalists and 50–60,000 by the Republicans, though he did not conceal his kind of irritation as to futility of the ongoing debate. A new civil war synthesis by Esdaile (2019) claimed 75,000 victims of Nationalist terror and 55,000 of the Republican repression.

== 2020s: Neo-Republicans vs. Revisionists and 100:50 ==
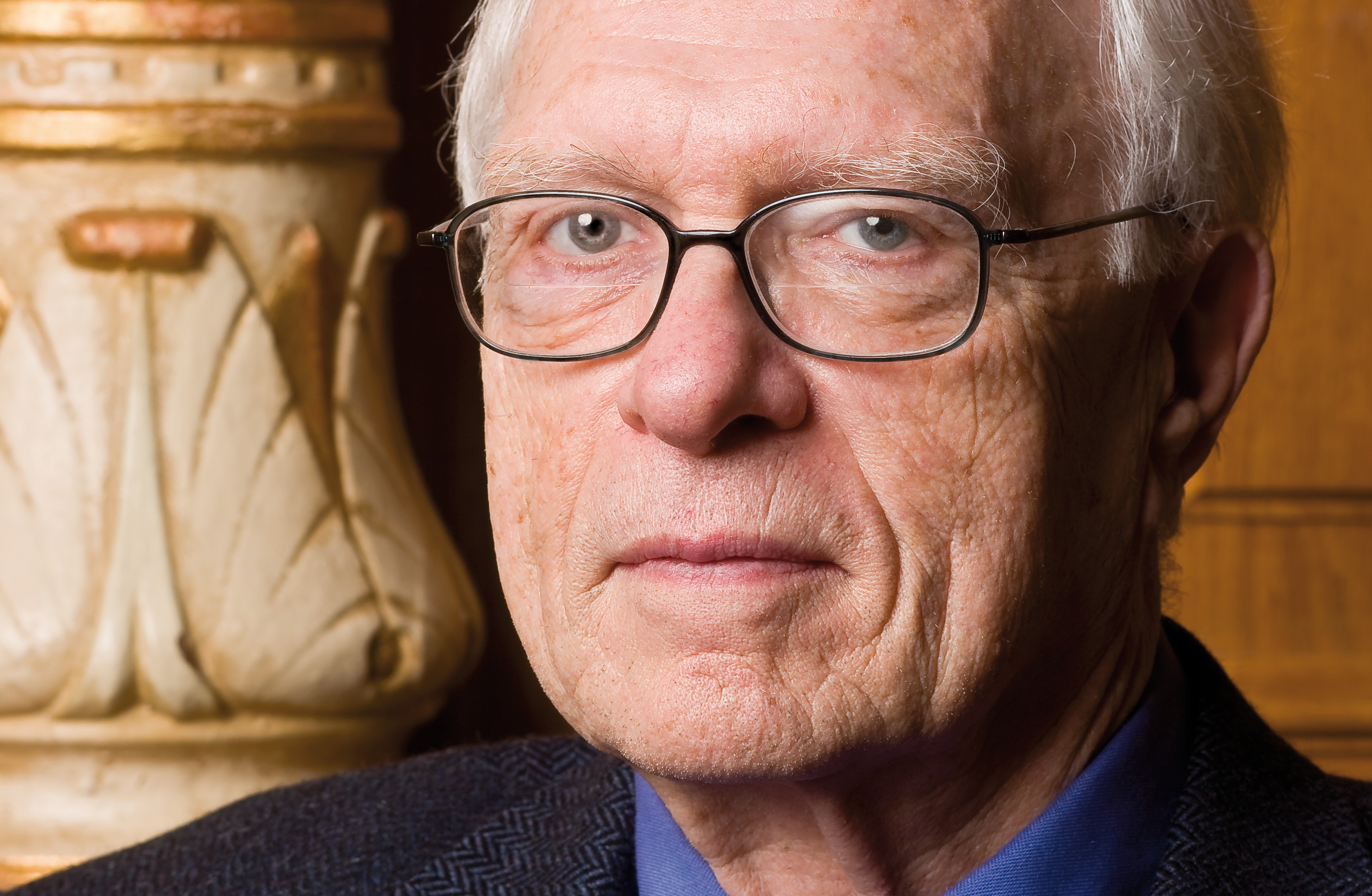
Stanley G. Payne

In the 2020s many scholars claim that there is a scientifically approved consensus about the 150:50 ratio, though some use its scaled-down variants, like 143:45 (Tizón 2022), 140:49 (Espinosa Maestre 2022), 135:50 (Alia Miranda 2020) or 130:50 (Reig Tapia 2025). However, these estimates include post-war Francoist terror and at times it is close to impossible to comprehend what is counted in and what is counted out. Attempts to understand the scale of war-only Nationalist terror by deducting the number of post-war fatalities from the total are inconclusive, as the number of killed by the regime after April 1939 might be given as 35,000, 40,000, or 50,000; in broad public discourse the figures in circulation might be around 100,000 or even 1 million. Scholarly statements which explicitly provide war-time repression figures are rare. An attempt at a historiographic summary claims that science has sort of agreed to 120–150,000 for Nationalist terror and 50,000 for the Republican one (Pérez Baquero 2022), but Casanova (2022) sticks to 100,000 vs. 55,000 (respectively Nationalist and Republican repression). There are attempts - usually not by academics - to challenge head-on the historiography-dominant figure of 50,000 victims of Republican repression, with new numbers reaching 60,000 (Esparza) or even 200,000 (Piñeiro Maceiras). This includes also local studies, e.g. in case of Catalonia. In the academia these studies are usually greeted with silence, though they receive some attention in the media, usually of right-wing leaning. Payne, in re-work of his earlier history of the war (2020), dropped the paragraph with numbers of Nationalist and Republican killings altogether. The debate, framed within the general controversy between (as they are dubbed by their opponents) neo-Republican and revisionist historians, is at times very bitter. Also foreign scholars do not agree even on the very basics.

== See also ==
- Revisionism (Spain)
- White Terror (Spain)
- Red Terror (Spain)
- Victims of the White Terror (Spain)
