= Victims of the White Terror (Spain) =

Spanish Civil War assassinations, 1936–1939

In the history of Spain, the White Terror was the series of assassinations realized by the Nationalist faction during the Spanish Civil War (1936–1939), and during the first nine years of the régime of General Francisco Franco. Thousands of victims are buried in hundreds of unmarked common graves (over 2,000), more than 600 in Andalusia alone. The largest of these is the common grave at San Rafael cemetery on the outskirts of Málaga (with perhaps more than 4,000 bodies). The Association for the Recovery of Historical Memory (Asociación para la Recuperación de la Memoria Historica or ARMH) says that the number of disappeared is over 35,000.

Concrete figures do not exist, as many supporters and sympathizers of the Republic fled Spain after losing the Civil War. Furthermore, the Francoist government destroyed thousands of documents relating to the White Terror and tried to hide the executions of the Republicans. Gabriel Jackson states that:

Prisons records and the death registers are misleading, since it is known that certificates of release were regularly signed by or for men who were then taken out and shot, and that certificates alleging heart attacks or apoplexy were made out for corpses left on the open road. Execution techniques deliberately disfigured the corpses so as to make them unrecognizable. Officials of the time have testified that families were afraid to report missing male members, and did not come to identify the bodies of the dead.

== Scholarly estimates of the White Terror's death toll ==
There is no concrete number, but there is a variety estimates of those murdered during the Francoist Repression.

Estimate	Sources
~58,000 - <60,000	Ramón Salas Larrazábal Warren H. Carroll Marek Jan Chodakiewicz
~65,000	Paweł Machcewicz
83,000	Pio Moa Martín Rubio
150,000	Julían Casanova "Victimas de la guerra civil" (1999)
175,000	Josep Fontana Hugh Thomas
180,000	Paul Preston
200,000	Antony Beevor
400,000	Gabriel Jackson Michael Richards

== Deaths from the White Terror in individual regions and provinces ==
There are, however, concrete regional and partial figures as compared to the figures to the amount killed in Spain overall. For example, in the province of Córdoba the victims of the White Terror number 9,579 (the historian Francisco Moreno Gómez has increased the number to 11,581). On the other hand, the victims of the Red Terror in the same province come to 2,060. According to the historian Francisco Espinosa, the victims of the Nationalists in only five Spanish provinces (Seville, Cádiz, Huelva, a part of Badajoz and a part of Cordoba) out of fifty were 25,000. The historian Paul Preston says that the number of victims judicially executed in 36 out 50 Spanish provinces were 92,462 (many other victims were executed without a trial). They died either as a result of the Nationalist repression during the war or as a result of the Francoist State's repression after the war. Other provincial number breakdowns are as follows:

Autonomous community	Province	White Terror	Red Terror
Andalusia	Almería	373; 375; 398	465; 466; 471
Andalusia	Cádiz	2,507 (Note: Incomplete data.); 3,000; 3,071; 3,303	95; 96
Andalusia	Córdoba	9,579; 9,589; 11,275; 11,581	2,060
Andalusia	Granada	5,048; 8,500; 12,504	994; 1,024
Andalusia	Huelva	6,019	101
Andalusia	Jaén	1,392 (Note: Incomplete data.); 2,641; 2,919; 3,040; 3,317	1,882; 1,924
Andalusia	Málaga	7,000; 7,471	2,607
Andalusia	Seville	8,000; 11,500; 12,509; 12,854; 13,520	479; 480
Andalusia	Total	39,920 (Note: Minimum figure based on provincial data.); 47,339; 50,093; 58,113 (Note: Maximum figure based on provincial data.)	8,367; 8,683 (Note: Minimum figure based on provincial data.); 8,763 (Note: Maximum figure based on provincial data.)
Aragón	Huesca	1,519	1,160
Aragón	Teruel	1,340	1,702
Aragón	Zaragoza	6,029; 6,029-6,546	192; 742
Aragón	Total	8,523; 8,888-9,405 (Note: Also minimum and maximum figures based on provincial data.)	3,054 (Note: Minimum figure based on provincial data.); 3,604 (Note: Maximum figure based on provincial data.); 3,901
Asturias	Asturias	5,952; 7,160	2,000
Balearic Islands	Balearic Islands	1,300; 1,777; 2,300 (Note: Just in Mallorca); 3,000 (Note: Just in Mallorca)	323
Basque Autonomous Community	Álaba-Araba	150; 157	0
Basque Autonomous Community	Gipuzkoa	500-600 (Note: Incomplete data.)	
Basque Autonomous Community	Bizkaia	900; 916 (Note: Incomplete data.)	
Basque Autonomous Community	Total	1,550 (Note: Minimum figure based on provincial data.); 1,673 (Note: Maximum figure based on provincial data.); 1,900	945
Canary Islands	Santa Cruz de Tenerife	1,600	0
Canary Islands	Las Palmas	1,000	0
Canary Islands	Total	2,600	0
Cantabria	Cantabria	923 (Note: Incomplete data.); 2,535	1,114
Castilla y León	Ávila province	1,000	0
Castilla y León	Burgos	1,038 (Note: Incomplete data.); 1,660-2,500; 2,500	0
Castilla y León	León	3,000; 5,800	0
Castilla y León	Palencia	1,500	0
Castilla y León	Salamanca	336 (Note: Incomplete data.); 1,000; 1,124	0
Castilla y León	Segovia	356; 358; 360	0
Castilla y León	Soria	300; 586	0
Castilla y León	Valladolid	1,207 (Note: Incomplete data.); 3,000; 3,430	0
Castilla y León	Zamora	2,000; 3,000; 5,000-6,000	0
Castilla y León	Total	10,381 (Note: Minimum figure based on provincial data.); 10,500; 14,660; 16,189; 22,176 (Note: Maximum figure based on provincial data.)	ND
Castilla-La Mancha	Albacete	1,600 (Note: Incomplete data, only includes those executed in the capital municipalities of the judicial districts.)	920
Castilla-La Mancha	Ciudad Real	1,614 (Note: Incomplete data, only include those executed in 4 municipalities: Ciudad Real, Manzanares, Puertollano and Tomelloso.); 3,887	2,186
Castilla-La Mancha	Cuenca	617 (Note: Incomplete data, only include those executed in 2 municipalities: Cuenca and Uclés.)	516
Castilla-La Mancha	Guadalajara	1,391; 1,428	ND
Castilla-La Mancha	Toledo	3,755; 3,826	ND
Castilla-La Mancha	Total	8,997 (Note: Minimum figure based on provincial data.); 9,500; 11,358 (Note: Maximum figure based on provincial data.)	3,622 (Note: Figure based on provincial data.)
Catalonia	Barcelona	1,716; 1,717 (Note: Incomplete data. Only those executed in the city of Barcelona between 1939 and 1952 are counted.)	
Catalonia	Girona	519	
Catalonia	Lleida	450; 750; 781 (Note: 1939-1956.)	1,232
Catalonia	Tarragona	703	
Catalonia	Total	3,388 (Note: Minimum figure based on provincial data.); 3,688; 3,720 (Note: Maximum figure based on provincial data.)	8,352
Ceuta, Melilla and the Spanish protectorate in Morocco	Ceuta, Melilla and the Spanish protectorate in Morocco	768	0
Extremadura	Badajoz province	6,600 (Note: Incomplete data. Only 84 towns and Badajoz city are included in the study.); 7,603; 7,909 (Note: Incomplete data.); 8,914; 11,205 (Note: 1936-1950)	243; 1,416
Extremadura	Cáceres province	1,680; 1,830; 2,000 (Note: 1936-1950)	130
Extremadura	Total	8,280 (Note: Minimum figure based on provincial data.); 9,221; 10,594; 12,000; 13,205 (Note: Maximum figure based on provincial data.)	1,546; 1,567; 1,600
Galicia	A Coruña	1,053 (Note: Incomplete data. Only the cities of Ferrol, A Coruña and Santiago de Compostela were studied in depth, and even in those the number is probably higher. (p. 745)); 1,165 (Note: Only counting those killed in judicial or extra-judicial executions between 1936 and 1939. Deadly repression continued after the end of the war. Incomplete data.); 1,579 (Note: Only including those killed in the comarcas of A Coruña, O Eume, Ferrolterra and Ortegal.)	0
Galicia	Lugo (Note: 1936-1940 only.)	625 (Note: Incomplete data.)	0
Galicia	Pontevedra	1,200-2,000 (Note: Incomplete data, 1936-1940.); 2,500	0
Galicia	Ourense (Note: 1936-1939 only.)	626-742	0
Galicia	Total	3,504 (Note: Minimum figure based on provincial data.); 4,265; 4,619 (Note: Only counting those killed in judicial or extra-judicial executions between 1936 and 1939. Deadly repression continued after the end of the war. Incomplete data.); 5,446 (Note: Maximum figure based on provincial data.); 5.800 (Note: 800 deaths caused by legal repression and 5,000 by extrajudicial killings.); 4,500-7,000; 7,000-8,000	0
La Rioja	La Rioja	2,000; 2,241	0
Madrid	Madrid	2,663 (Note: Incomplete data.); 2,933 (Note: Incomplete data. Only those executed between 1939 and 1944 in the "Cementerio de la Almudena" (Madrid city) are counted.)	8,815
Murcia	Murcia	1,576	
Navarre	Navarre	2,789; 3,240; 3,260	0
Valencian Community	Alicante	721 (Note: Incomplete data.); 742; 979	840; 1,005
Valencian Community	Castellón	1,052; 1,282	1,031
Valencian Community	Valencia	3,128	2,844
Valencian Community	Total	4,901 (Note: Minimum figure based on provincial data.); 4,922; 5,389 (Note: Maximum figure based on provincial data.); 5,879 (Note: 4,714 executed and 1,165 died as a direct consequence of being mistreated in prison.)	4,715 (Note: Minimum figure based on provincial data.); 4,795; 4,880 (Note: Maximum figure based on provincial data.)

=== Deaths from the White Terror in individual cities and comarcas ===
There are also various studies with concrete figures of the deaths caused by the White Terror in specific municipalities, comarcas or metropolitan areas. Local/comarcal figures can be inconsistent with the provincial/regional ones because they tend to be more accurate and complete.

City or comarca	Autonomous community	Years	White Terror	Red Terror
Madrid (city)	Madrid	1939-1944	2,933	-
Barcelona (city)	Catalonia	1939-1952	1,717	-
Seville (city)	Andalusia	1936-April 1937	3,028	-
Zaragoza (city)	Aragón	1936-1946	3,543	-
Granada (city)	Andalusia	-	5,000	0
Gijón (city)	Asturias	1937-1950	1,934	-
A Coruña (metropolitan area)	Galicia	1936-1939	595	0
Oviedo (city)	Asturias	1937-1950	1,600 (Note: 1,316 identified)	-
Pamplona (city)	Navarre	-	303	0
Albacete (city)	Castilla-La Mancha	1939-1950	1,280	-
León (city)	Castilla y León	-	1,018	0
Jaén (city)	Andalusia	1939-1952	1,675	-
Santander	Cantabria	1936-1939	420	205
Ciudad Real (city)	Castilla-La Mancha	1936-1943	988	-
Ferrol (metropolitan area)	Galicia	1936-1976	984	0
Guadalajara (city)	Castilla-La Mancha	1939-1944	822	-
Antequera (comarca)	Andalusia	1936-1945	613	0
Pontevedra (city)	Galicia	1936-1939	200	0
Torrelavega (city)	Cantabria	1936-1939	171	54
La Loma (comarca)	Andalusia	1939-1949	394	-
Puertollano (city)	Castilla-La Mancha	1936-1943	300	-
Zamora (city) (Note: Incomplete data.)	Castilla y León		443	0
Alcázar de San Juan (city)	Castilla-La Mancha	1936-1943	365	95-126
Baixo Miño (comarca)	Galicia	1936-1941	552 (Note: 252 were local people and 300 prisoners in the two concentration camps that operated in the comarca.)	0
O Condado-A Paradanta (comarca)	Galicia	1936-1939	71	0

== See also ==
- Historiography on Spanish Civil War repressions (numbers)
