= Shepard B. Clough =

- Born: Shepard Bancroft Clough; December 9, 1901; Bloomington, Indiana
- Died: June 7, 1990 (aged 88); St. Johnsbury, Vermont
- Awards: Rome Prize (1922)

Academic background
- Education: Colgate University (BA); Columbia University (PhD)
- Thesis: A History of the Flemish Movement in Belgium: A Study in Nationalism (1930)
- Doctoral advisor: Carlton J. H. Hayes

Academic work
- Discipline: Economic history
- Institutions: Columbia University
- Doctoral students: Stanley G. Payne

Shepard Bancroft Clough (December 6, 1901 – June 7, 1990) was an American economic historian. He was a professor of European history at Columbia University.

== Biography ==
Clough was born on December 6, 1901, in Bloomington, Indiana, and moved to Lebanon, New Hampshire, in 1903. He graduated from Colby Academy in 1919 and received his bachelor's degree from Colgate University in 1923. He then did his postgraduate work at the Sorbonne and Heidelberg. He received his doctorate from Columbia University for a thesis on the Flemish nationalist movement prepared under the supervision of Carlton J. H. Hayes in 1930, and began teaching there in 1928.

During World War II, Clough was in the economic studies division of the United States Department of State, lectured at the U.S. Army School of Military Government at the University of Virginia, and worked for the Office of Foreign Relief and Rehabilitation Operations, a short-lived predecessor to the United Nations Relief and Rehabilitation Administration. He was among the five founding members of the Economic History Association, established with a grant from the Rockefeller Foundation in 1940. He became a Knight in the Order of Merit of the Italian Republic and a chevalier of the Legion of Honour after the war.

Clough was the author of a number of books on European economic history and civilizational cycles. He was also a visiting professor at Sciences Po and the University of Grenoble. The lectures he gave in Europe were published as The American Way in 1953.

According to historian Loren Graham, Clough was firmly opposed to Columbia's Department of History hiring women as professors, and it was only as he was nearing his retirement in 1969 that Nina Garsoïan became the first woman to receive tenure there.

Clough served as the president of the Economic History Association in 1969. He retired in 1970 from teaching. He died on June 7, 1990, in St. Johnsbury, Vermont.
