= The Spanish Civil War, the Soviet Union, and Communism =

2004 book by Stanley G. Payne

- Cover
- Author: Stanley G. Payne
- Language: English
- Subject: Spanish Civil War, Soviet foreign policy, and communism in Spain
- Genre: History
- Publisher: Yale University Press
- Publication date: 2004
- Publication place: New Haven, Connecticut
- Media type: Print and digital
- Pages: 416
- Awards: The Marshall Shulman Book Prize from the Association for Slavic, East European, and Eurasian Studies (2005)
- ISBN: 978-0-300-10068-6
- Dewey Decimal: 946.081/3/0947
- LC Class: HX343.P39 2004
- Preceded by: Spain's First Democracy (1993)
- Followed by: The Collapse of the Spanish Republic (2005)

The Spanish Civil War, the Soviet Union, and Communism is a 2004 book by the American historian Stanley G. Payne. Payne traces the policies of the Soviet Union, the Communist International, and the Communist Party of Spain toward the Spanish Republic from the early 1930s to the end of the Civil War in 1939.

The author rejects the common view that Communist policy in Spain was counterrevolutionary. The Communists, he argues, pursued a revolutionary strategy of their own, aimed at a "democratic republic of a new type" that anticipated the people's democracies of postwar Eastern Europe. Payne relies on Comintern, Soviet, and Spanish records, many opened to researchers only after the dissolution of the Soviet Union.

In 2005, the book won the Marshall Shulman Book Prize from the Association for Slavic, East European, and Eurasian Studies (2005).

== Background ==
After Spain's First Democracy (1993), his general history of the Second Spanish Republic, Payne returned to the period with two other books published by Yale University Press: The Spanish Civil War, the Soviet Union, and Communism (2004) and The Collapse of the Spanish Republic (2005).

In a 2006 interview for the University of Wisconsin–Madison, he recalled that the opening of the Soviet archives had supplied direct documentation of Soviet conduct in Spain "that we'd never had before", which pushed him to take another look at the revolution through communism and the Soviet connection. Payne had considered Russian history as a field early in his studies and read the language slowly with a dictionary, enough, in his account, to bring the two subjects together.

== Synopsis ==
Payne studies the policies of the Soviet Union, the Communist International (Comintern), and the Communist Party of Spain (PCE) from the founding of the Comintern to the end of the Spanish Civil War in 1939. He presents his work as the first broad synthesis of Soviet policy and its relation to the revolutionary process in Spain. He uses Comintern and Soviet military records opened after 1991, together with Spanish, German, and other sources.

The first four chapters cover the prewar years. Payne documents Soviet foreign policy from early revolutionary agitation through "peaceful coexistence" and the confrontational "Third Period" to the Popular Front turn announced in 1935. Spanish communism, meanwhile, remained a small movement, long overshadowed by the anarcho-syndicalist CNT and the Socialists. Even so, he insists that in the years before the war the PCE wielded considerably more influence than has usually been thought, a conclusion later emphatically confirmed by Gustavo Martín Asensio's carefully researched "The Comintern in Spain the Civil War: Red Tide Rising" (London: Bloomsbury 2024). He also finds the French Popular Front government elected in 1936 to have been far more democratic than its Spanish counterpart. He covers Joaquín Maurín and the dissident communist current that became the POUM, the Socialist Party's leftward radicalization, and the failed insurrection of October 1934. The Popular Front victory in the February 1936 elections he treats not as a vindication of the Republic's democracy but as the start of its revolutionary breakdown.

The remaining chapters concentrate on the war. Payne argues that the familiar account of Communist policy as "counterrevolutionary" or "moderate" is based on a misreading of the Popular Front, which the Comintern conceived as a tactic on the way to a "democratic republic of a new type": an all-leftist, semipluralist regime that would eliminate the right and nationalize major industry while keeping the outward forms of democracy as political camouflage. The Comintern neither sought nor welcomed the military rebellion of July 1936. But the rebellion, and the largely anarchist-led social revolution that followed, gave it the chance to test that strategy. Stalin's decision to intervene was incremental and ad hoc. The commitment stayed limited: slightly more than three thousand Soviet personnel, enough to postpone the Republic's defeat but not to offset the heavier German and Italian aid to Franco. Most of the Spanish gold reserve went to Moscow, and Payne contends that inflated prices and exchange rates let the Soviet Union profit from the arrangement. He charts the building of the People's Army and the course of the Red Terror, in which the PCE took part.

Payne then focuses on the struggle inside the Republican camp: The POUM was suppressed and its leader, Andreu Nin, killed by the NKVD. Juan Negrín rose to head the government. Segismundo Casado's anticommunist coup against it ended the war. From the conflict the Soviet military learned lessons of its own, including faulty conclusions about armored doctrine.

Measured against the people's democracies the Soviet Union later established in Eastern Europe, the wartime Republic emerges in the book's last chapter as what Payne calls "the nearest approximation to a people's republic in the history of Western Europe". Yet it was never a Soviet satellite, he insists. It differed from the postwar Soviet model in fundamental respects, retaining a residual framework of law and a semipluralism among the leftist parties.

== Reception ==
Dennis J. Dunn found the book "balanced, fair, yet provocative": it demonstrated, with solid documentation, that the Republic was no paradigm of democracy and that the PCE was not a counterrevolutionary force but "an agency to build the first experimental Soviet satellite outside of the Soviet Union". Dunn agreed that Communist policy aimed at revolution from above rather than below, and that the wartime Republic furnished lessons later applied in Eastern Europe. His one reservation was that a prototype for such a regime had existed in Soviet-dominated Mongolia from 1921. He recommended the study highly.

The work struck George Esenwein as "neither ideological nor polemical" but "a judicious and diligently researched study". Most provocative, to him, was the claim that the Communists had pursued revolutionary rather than counterrevolutionary goals under the Popular Front. Esenwein objected that Payne "does not fully account for the fact that, in context, communist policies and practices could legitimately be interpreted as counterrevolutionary", since "revolution" meant different things to different groups and the Communists turned violence and repression on the forces to their left. For all Payne's "well-known antipathies toward the Spanish left", he held, the book debunked old political myths rather than reviving them and "should not be ignored".

Gabriel Jackson credited Payne with "important data", clear writing, and "the best case that can be made for the conservative forces in Spain in the 1930s", but "he tells the truth but not the whole truth, in accord with a long nurtured hostility to everything associated with 'communism'". Jackson defended Juan Negrín, whose dependence on the Soviet Union he traced almost entirely to the Non-Intervention Committee, which had left the Republic no other source of arms. Treating every form of necessary wartime cooperation with the Communists as subservience to Stalin was a "terrible oversimplification": what, he asked, would the same approach make of Roosevelt and Churchill after 1941?

For Robert H. Whealey the book was "packed with new information and supported by ample notes", if "difficult for any general reader to follow". Payne, he judged, was at his best in the chapter on Soviet military operations, where the account remained balanced, "neither praising nor condemning Dimitrov or Stalin, but simply letting the facts speak for themselves"; the Stalin portrayed was a calculating politician, not a 1950s caricature. Franco, Hitler, and Mussolini, though, were "almost totally absent" from the book; it advanced "three contradictory themes" scattered through the text; and its recurring comparison of Spanish revolutionary sentiment with crises in Finland, Weimar Germany, Mongolia, China, and Afghanistan "strains the imagination". He called the result "a first-class job of research" whose reliance on the passive voice "will annoy the reader".

Working from sources in Spanish, Russian, English, and German, Payne produced what Victor Rosenberg called "the first broadly synthetic account of Soviet policy and its relation to the revolutionary process in Spain during the 1930s". Rosenberg stressed the finding that the Soviet commitment "was never heavy" and the argument that Soviet insistence on payment in gold "ensured that the Soviet Union profited financially".

== Awards ==
- Marshall Shulman Book Prize from the Association for Slavic, East European, and Eurasian Studies (2005)
