= Carlos Forcadell =

Spanish historian

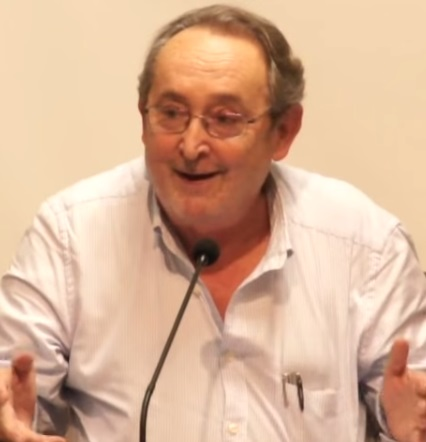
- Born: 26 March 1946 (age 80); Zaragoza, Spain

Academic background
- Education: University of Zaragoza; Heidelberg University
- Thesis: El movimiento obrero español durante la Gran Guerra

Academic work
- Discipline: history
- Institutions: University of the Basque Country; University of Zaragoza
- Main interests: labor movement in Spain history of Aragon public use of history political culture

Carlos Forcadell Álvarez (born 1946) is a Spanish historian, Professor Emeritus of Contemporary History of the University of Zaragoza (UNIZAR). The scope of his academic research includes the history of the labor movement in Spain, the public use of history, political cultures in Spain, historiography as well as the history of Aragon.

== Biography ==
Born on 26 March 1946 in Zaragoza, Forcadell earned a licentiate degree from the University of Zaragoza in 1969. He took post-graduate studies at Heidelberg University. Following his return to Spain in 1974, he obtained a PhD in 1977, reading a dissertation titled El movimiento obrero español durante la Gran Guerra. A senior lecturer at the University of the Basque Country (UPV) and UNIZAR, he was promoted to a Chair in Contemporary History at UNIZAR in 1990. Appointed Director of the Institución "Fernando el Católico" (IFC) in December 2006, he was granted the title of Chronicler of the city of Zaragoza on 5 February 2009. He retired in 2016.

== Works ==
- — (1978). Parlamentarismo y bolchevización. El movimiento obrero español, 1914-18. Barcelona: Crítica.
