= Stanley G. Payne =

American academic and historian (born 1934)

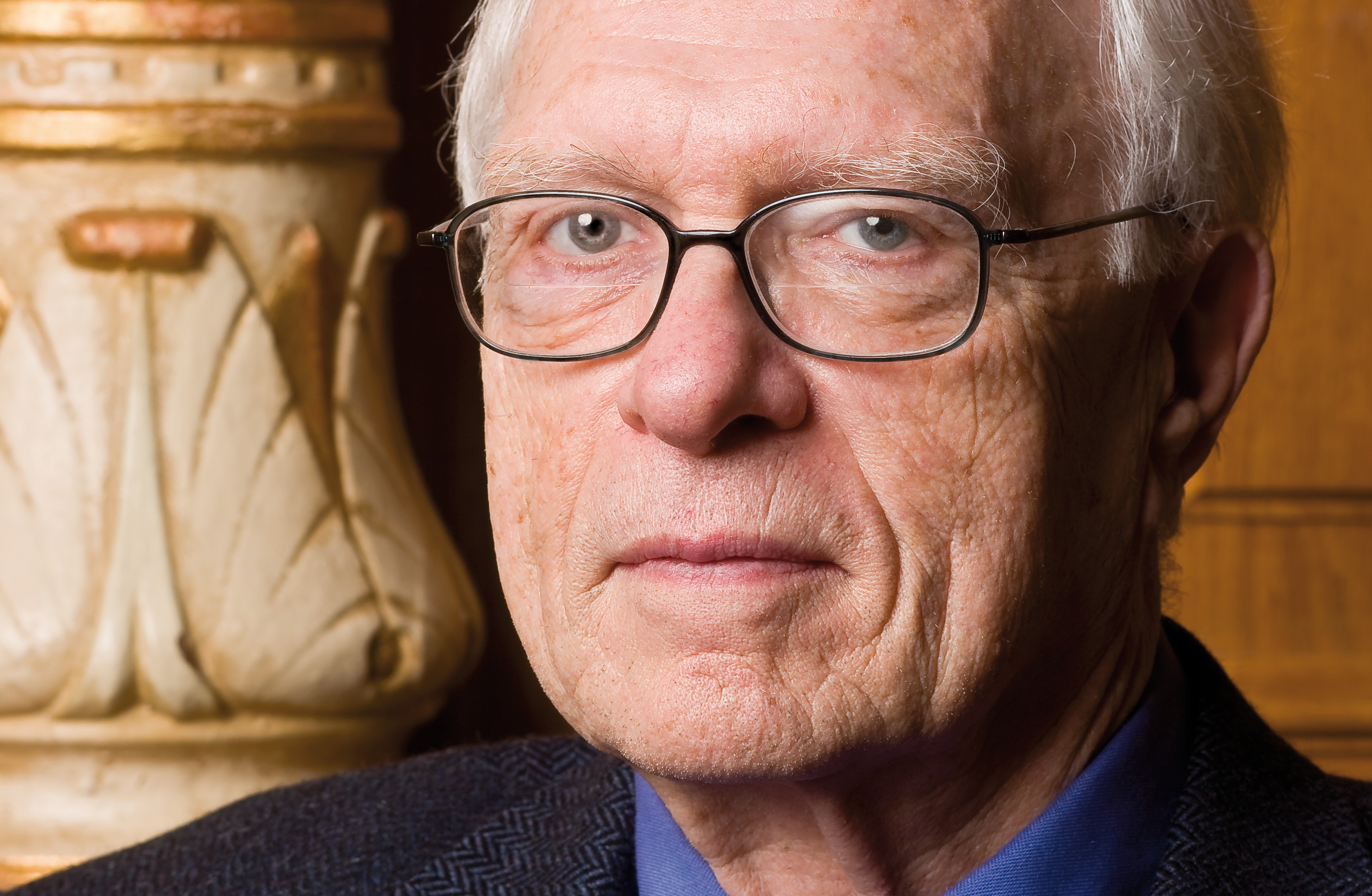
- Stanley G. Payne
- Born: Stanley George Payne; September 9, 1934 (age 92); Denton, Texas, U.S.
- Occupation: historian
- Title: Professor Emeritus

Academic background
- Education: Pacific Union College (B.A.); Claremont Graduate School and University Center (M.A.); Columbia University (Ph.D.)
- Thesis: Falange Española, 1931–1942: The Rise and Stagnation of a Fascist Movement (1960)
- Doctoral advisor: Shepard B. Clough

Academic work
- Discipline: modern history
- Sub-discipline: Spanish history
- Institutions: Hunter College (1960); University of Minnesota (1960–1962); University of California, Los Angeles (1962–1968); University of Wisconsin–Madison (1968–2005)
- Main interests: Spanish Civil War, history of fascism
- Website: https://history.wisc.edu/people/payne-stanley/

Stanley G. Payne (born September 9, 1934) is an American academic and historian, specialized in the history of modern Spain and European fascist movements. Having taught at the University of Wisconsin–Madison for 37 years, he became a professor emeritus at its Department of History in 2004.

His works on the Spanish Civil War and the Francoist period received various estimates: while by the 1980s he had earned the reputation of "America's most prolific historian of Spain", in the 21st century his later works became known for their "revisionist" approach, and received criticism from other historians as overly benevolent towards Falangism and for allegedly spreading Francoist narratives. However, other historians have praised Payne's work in the 21st century. In 2018, Julius Ruiz praised Payne's 2017 work Alcala Zamora and the Failure of the Spanish Republic.

== Early life ==
Stanley George Payne was born on September 9, 1934, in Denton, Texas. His parents were living in Colorado before moving to Denton. His father worked as a carpenter after losing his job due to the Great Depression in the United States, and eventually became the foreman of a planing mill. His mother completed two years of nurse training at a sanitarium in Chicago, Illinois but was forced to drop out due to lack of support from her family. She was a Seventh-Day Adventist. The family moved to Sacramento, California when Stanley was twelve and his parents eventually divorced soon after.(revise - conflicting)

== Education and career ==
Payne received his B.A. from Pacific Union College in Angwin, California in 1955. Subsequently, he earned a M.A. from Claremont Graduate School and University Center in Claremont, California (1957) and a Ph.D. from Columbia University in New York City (1960) under the supervision of Shepard B. Clough. He worked as a lecturer at Columbia University during his doctorate (1959–1960) and went on to hold the same position at the Hunter College in New York City (1960). Then, he became an instructor at the University of Minnesota in Minneapolis (1960–1962) and an assistant professor of history at the University of California, Los Angeles (1962–1968). At that time, he became vice-chairman of the History Department at the same institution (1966–1967). Payne was appointed professor of history at the University of Wisconsin in Madison, Wisconsin in 1968 and retired as Professor Emeritus of its History Department in 2005.

== Work ==
Known for his typological description of fascism, Payne specialized in the history of modern Spain, particularly on the Spanish fascist movement, and has worked on comparative analyses of European fascist movements in Western Europe.

His first book on the Falange drew on interviews with party members conducted as part of doctoral research in Spain during 1958–59, and acknowledged a "heavy debt" to the party's ex-propaganda chief Dionisio Ridruejo and its former head Manuel Hedilla, who also emerged as the main neo-Falangist leader at the time.

In the 1960s, Payne's books were published in Spanish by Éditions Ruedo ibérico (ERi), a publishing company set up by Spanish Republican exiles in Paris, France, to publish works forbidden in Spain by the Francoist regime ruling the country at the time. He has been referred to by some historians as a revisionist due to his views. One of his more famous books is Spanish Civil War, The Soviet Union and Communism, which analyzes Joseph Stalin and the Soviet government's intervention in Spain. He also wrote The Franco Regime, The Spanish Civil War and A History of Fascism 1914–1945.

=== Typological description of fascism ===
Payne presents his typology of generic fascism divided under three headings:

A. Ideology and Goals:

- Espousal of an idealist, vitalist, and voluntaristic philosophy, normally involving the attempt to realize a new modern, self-determined, and secular culture
- Creation of a new nationalist authoritarian state not based on traditional principles or models
- Organization of a new highly regulated, multiclass, integrated national economic structure, whether called national corporatist, national socialist, or national syndicalist
- Positive evaluation and use of, or willingness to use, violence and war
- The goal of empire, expansion, or a radical change in the nation's relationship with other powers

B. The Fascist Negations:

- anti-liberalism
- anti-communism
- anti-conservatism (though with the understanding that fascist groups were willing to undertake temporary alliances with groups from any other sector, most commonly with the right)

C. Style and Organization:

- Attempted mass mobilization with militarization of political relationships and style and with the goal of a mass party militia
- Emphasis on aesthetic structure of meetings, symbols, and political liturgy, stressing emotional and mystical aspects
- Extreme stress on the masculine principle and male dominance, while espousing a strongly organic view of society
- Exaltation of youth above other phases of life, emphasizing the conflict of generations, at least in effecting the initial political transformation
- Specific tendency toward an authoritarian, charismatic, personal style of command, whether or not the command is to some degree initially elective

To distinguish between fascist and non-fascist authoritarian nationalist groups, Payne divides these movements into fascist, radical right, and conservative authoritarian right. Payne notes that these groups shared some of the same goals as fascists and that there were instances of usually temporary or circumstantial tactical alliances between them which sometimes led to outright fusion, especially between fascists and the radical right.

Originally presented in his 1980 book Fascism: Comparison and Definition, Payne updated his typology in A History of Fascism, 1914–1945 in 1995 to place a greater emphasis on ideology. In the book, Payne also offers a one sentence definition:

"a form of revolutionary ultranationalism for national rebirth that is based on a primarily vitalist philosophy, is structured on extreme elitism, mass mobilization, and the Führerprinzip, positively values violence as end as well as means and tends to normatize war and/or the military virtues."

He also asserts that there were some specific ways in which Nazism paralleled Russian communism to a much greater degree than Fascism was capable of doing. Payne does not propound the theory of "red fascism" nor the notion that Communism and Nazism are essentially the same. He states that Nazism more nearly paralleled Russian communism than any other noncommunist system has.

==== Reception ====
Roger Griffin described Payne's work as a "methodological breakthrough" and praises his typology as being "a deliberately schematized and simplified model which identifies what fascisms have in common rather than highlighting their undeniable complexity and uniqueness". Griffin further describes Payne's typology as "[setting] up a superbly positioned and equipped base camp from which to carry out gruelling scholarly expeditions" and views it as "the most comprehensive and sophisticated expression" of the "new consensus" that sees fascism as a tangible political ideology centred around utopia rather than nihilism.

Roger Eatwell describes Payne's 1995 book by saying: "Overall, there is no doubt that Payne's latest book is the best general history of fascism in the inter-war period, offering a finely tuned account of how the national differences between the various fascist movements do not negate the attempt to create a generic model." However, Eatwell also criticises Payne's work for largely ignoring the intellectual basis of fascism and considers it a useful heuristic starting point that "ultimately does little more than underline a few key words". Eatwell criticises Payne's focus on fascism's negations and asserts that his typology places an undue focus on the context of the interwar period.

Dave Renton has criticised Payne's approach to definition of fascism, which he describes as an attempt to present fascism as a static set of certain beliefs without examining the relationship between these ideas within a dynamic and contradictory process. In particular, Renton notes that in Payne's description of fascism through "three negations", anti-communism, anti-liberalism and anti-conservatism, the latter label is troublesome, since Payne "cannot explain why the rise of the two fascist parties that actually seized power was helped, in both cases, by an alliance with the conservative ruling classes." It becomes clear that "fascist anti-conservatism is different from fascist anti-communism" and the conflict of anti-communism and anti-conservatism has always been solved in the favor of the first. According to Renton, because Payne founds his theory on description but not explanation, he and other historians "fail to generate a non-fascist understanding of fascism. Their readers are led to a conclusion that the fascist view of itself is the most important factor of the definition of the ideology. This is not a critical theory of fascism, and hardly any sort of theory, at all."

=== Controversy surrounding Francoist revisionism ===
Payne's work has been criticized as sympathetic to Francoism by some historians since the 1980s. In 1988, Charles Powell in a review of Payne's The Franco Regime, 1936-1975 described Payne as the "[having shown] the greatest benevolence toward the Franco regime" among "Anglo-American" scholars of the Spanish Civil War and wrote: "The attempt to summarize the origins of the civil war in a few pages leads the author to make value judgments that are not always justified... In general, his interpretation — and the use of expressions such as 'latent authoritarian situation' used to describe the political climate in the spring of 1936 — tends to justify the rebellion." A year before, Paul Preston wrote a positive review of The Franco Regime, praising Payne as "America's most prolific historian of Spain" and arguing that the book "must surely become the standard work on this subject": "I do not agree with some of his judgments, particularly on the social costs of the regime, but I regard The Franco Regime as the most solidly based and sanely balanced book yet to appear on this difficult subject. [...] It is to be hoped that its careful attempts at an objective narrative do not deprive it of the general readership it deserves." In 1989, Robert Whealey praised The Franco Regime as presenting the "freshest account yet" on the Spanish Civil War, and stated that Payne "will remain the leading U.S. authority on twentieth-century Spain for some time to come." Whealey noted that the book had a conservative tone, but claimed it was essential reading for any twentieth-century historian of Europe. F. J. R. Jiménez argues that Payne has become more conservative over time.

Payne has been supportive of "revisionist" authors on the Spanish Civil War and Francoism. In 2003, Payne published an article in defense of the writer Pío Moa, praising Moa's work as "critical, innovative" which, according to Payne, "introduced a breath of fresh air into a vital area of contemporary Spanish historiography"; Payne accused the Spanish universities and academics of undeservedly silencing and ostracizing Moa in the vein of "fascist Italy or the Soviet Union." Santos Juliá wrote in response: "Stanley Payne's paternalistic contempt is perplexing and disappointing [...] Today, researchers who, in Payne's opinion, publish nothing but "narrow and formulaic" studies have provided the necessary data to finally put an end to the purely propagandistic disputes surrounding the violence unleashed by the victors in the construction of [Francoist Spain], during and after the war." In 2022, Payne stated that Moa's work while "imperfect" and containing "several" "interpretations" that "could be questioned" in general "was a major contribution to discussion of the Civil War," "unique in adopting a thematic and problem-oriented approach and in aggressively confronting the dominant myths," and repeated that major scholars should have discussed Moa's book instead of ignoring it.

Ángel Viñas is highly critical of Payne's methods of research, including Payne's founding his interpretation almost entirely on secondary sources and not on primary evidence: "Payne's methodology and assumptions simply have no basis." In particular, he writes that Payne's work The Spanish Civil War, the Soviet Union, and Communism (2004) which supports Burnett Bolloten's theses that the Communists and Stalin sought a takeover of Spain with the help of Juan Negrin "has now become hopelessly obsolete" due to "archival material" proving the opposite to Bolloten's and Payne's theses which, according to him, have never relied on concrete evidence. Viñas stated that while he admired Payne in the past, now he sees his works as driven by political agenda instead of research and accused him of promoting "Francoists myths" and narratives. The Hispanist Henry Kamen praised Payne's work for using research in Russian which used materials from Soviet police archives.

In 2014 he published Franco. A Personal and Political Biography with Jesús Palacios, who during his youth had been a member of the now-banned neo-Nazi group CEDADE. Since then, he has been considered an iconic figure in Francoist revisionism. Felipe Fernández-Armesto described this work as "vindication" of Franco; Juan Carlos Losada writes that "Payne and Palacios drastically reduce the amount of violence lashed out by the rebels and add some alleged factors which militated in the same direction," "extoll Franco´s strategic capability and oppose the view that his military decisions kept the war going for too long," "take refuge in the customary topics about Juan Negrin being a Moscow agent and adhere to the conveniently modernized Francoist myths of the old historiography established during the Franco regime." Claudio Hernandez Burgos in his review wrote that the biography of Franco presents itself as objective and a "third path" between neo-Francoist publications and "leftist" "anti-Francoist" historiography, but in fact offers "soft revisionism" which partially disagrees with neo-Francoists, but still places Francoist myths "beyond critical enquiry", downplays Francoist violence and Franco's personal role in it, and presents an "excessively indulgent" account of Franco's life and rule.

== Honours ==
- Spain:
  - Knight Grand Cross of the Order of Isabella the Catholic (2009)

== Books ==
- Falange: A History of Spanish Fascism, 1961
- Politics and the Military in Modern Spain, 1967
- Franco's Spain, 1967
- The Spanish Revolution, 1970
- A History of Spain and Portugal (2 vol 1973) full text online free vol 1 before 1700; full text online free vol 2 after 1700; standard scholarly history
- Basque Nationalism, 1975
- La revolución y la guerra civil española, 1976
- Fascism: Comparison and Definition, 1980
- Spanish Catholicism: An Historical Overview, 1984
- The Franco Regime 1936–1975, 1988
- Franco: El perfil de la historia, 1992
- Spain's First Democracy: The Second Republic, 1931–1936, 1993
- A History of Fascism 1914–1945, 1996
- El primer franquismo, 1939–1959: Los años de la autarquía, 1998
- Fascism in Spain 1923–1977, 2000
- The Spanish Civil War, the Soviet Union, and Communism 1931–1939, 2004
- El colapso de la República: Los orígenes de la Guerra Civil 1933-1936, 2005
- The Collapse of the Spanish Republic, 1933–1936, 2006
- 40 preguntas fundamentales sobre la Guerra Civil, 2006
- Franco and Hitler: Spain, Germany, and World War II, 2008
- ¿Por qué la República perdió la guerra?, 2010
- Spain: A Unique History, 2011
- Civil War in Europe, 1905-1949, 2011
- La Europa revolucionaria: Las guerras civiles que marcaron el siglo XX, 2011
- The Spanish Civil War, 2012
- Franco: A Personal and Political Biography, 2014, with Jesús Palacios
- Franco: Una biografía personal y política, 2014, with Jesús Palacios
- El fascismo, 2014
- La Guerra Civil Española, 2014
- El camino al 18 de julio: La erosión de la democracia en España, diciembre de 1935 - julio de 1936, 2016
- 365 momentos clave de la historia de España, 2016
- En defensa de España : desmontando mitos y leyendas negras, 2017
- La revolución española, 1936-1939: Un estudio sobre la singularidad de la Guerra Civil, 2019

== Bibliography ==
- Arroyo Menéndez, Millán (2020). "Las causas del apoyo electoral a VOX en españa". Política y Sociedad. 57 (3). Madrid: 693–717. doi:10.5209/poso.69206. S2CID 241063503.
- Eatwell, Roger (1996). "On defining the 'Fascist Minimum': The centrality of ideology". Journal of Political Ideologies. 1 (3): 303–319. doi:10.1080/13569319608420743.
- Ferreira, Carles (2019). "Vox como representante de la derecha radical en España: un estudio sobre su ideología" [Vox as Representative of the Radical Right in Spain: A study of its Ideology]. Revista Española de Ciencia Política (in Spanish). 51 (51): 73–98. doi:10.21308/recp.51.03. ISSN 2173-9870.
- Griffin, Roger (1998). International Fascism: Theories, Causes and the New Consensus. London: Arnold. ISBN 978-0-340-70614-5.
- Payne, Stanley G. (1980). Fascism: Comparison and Definition. Madison, WI: University of Wisconsin Press.
- Payne, Stanley G. (1995). A History of Fascism, 1914–1945. Madison, WI: University of Wisconsin Press. ISBN 978-0-299-14873-7.
