= Pío Moa =

Spanish journalist

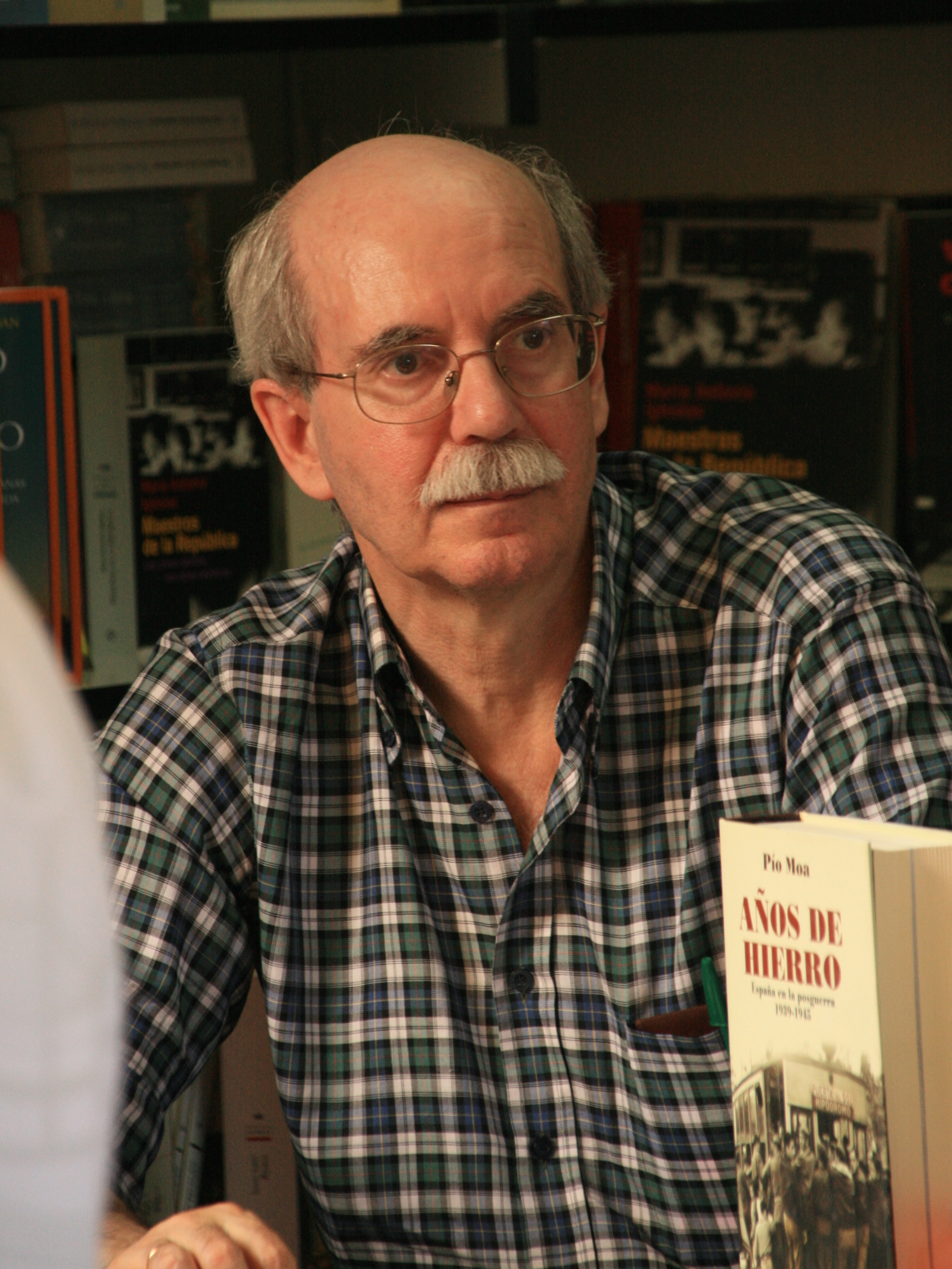
- Born: 1948 (age 77–78); Vigo, Galicia, Spain
- Education: Escuela Oficial de Periodismo
- Occupation: Journalist
- Writing career
- Subject: 20th century
- Notable work: Myths of the Civil War

Luis Pío Moa Rodríguez (Vigo, Galicia, 1948) better known as simply Pío Moa, is a Spanish historian and journalist. He has authored historical essays about the origins of the Spanish Civil War, the Second Republic in Spain, Francoism and the various political movements of that era.

Following the death of Franco and the reinstatement of a democratic regime in Spain, a slow process of opening of archives and publicizing of Civil War related documents began. In the face of this process Moa started reviving the Francoist theses that the parties that formed the Popular Front were ultimately responsible for the Spanish Civil War and the rise of autocracy in Spain. Moa maintains that they have left a legacy of "moral, political and intellectual devastation", accuses the left of hypocrisy in regards to democracy and totalitarianism and claims that the material aid provided by Stalin and the Soviet Union to the Spanish Republic in the Civil War not only prolonged the war and caused innumerable deaths but also was equivalent to the help provided by Nazi Germany and Fascist Italy to General Franco.

The polemical nature of Moa's writings have gained him much public attention in Spain and a measure of controversy as a result. His best-selling book, Myths of the Civil War, with 150,000 units sold, was a best-seller for six consecutive months.

== Biography ==
=== Education and militancy ===
Moa was born in 1948 in Vigo, Galicia, Spain. From 1967 to 1974, he studied at the Escuela Oficial de Periodismo in Madrid, an institution reserved for Falange members. During his time at the school, he read Maoist literature and became a radical anti-Francoist agitator. He served as a student council representative for his class and then for the school.

On completing his studies, Moa volunteered for the Spanish Marine Infantry as part of his military service; he later claimed he had wanted "to learn how to make bombs". In 1975, he became a founding member of the clandestine Maoist terrorist-designated organisation GRAPO (an alleged armed wing of the Communist Party of Spain (Reconstituted), also formed in 1975), which was involved in violent clashes with the government's Movimiento Nacional. Moa was present at the murder of a policeman on 1 October 1975 after the execution of two ETA and three FRAP members. Two other members of GRAPO, Enrique Cerdán Calixto and Abelardo Collazo Araújo, were also present. Cerdán shot the police officer. Moa was expelled from GRAPO in 1977 and later recalled this period of his life in About Time and a Country: The Violent Left. After the Spanish transition to democracy, Moa became a scholar of contemporary Spanish history and his views shifted over time towards a pro-Franco stance.

=== Intellectual evolution and writing ===
Moa has become an outspoken critic of the Spanish political left, which he accuses of being the main cause of the Spanish Civil War.

He has also written essays on Feminism, Marxism, current Spanish politics and an autobiographical book about his experiences in the terrorist group GRAPO. In his books, he strongly criticises Franco's communist, socialist and nationalist rivals.

Moa is rejected as a "pseudo-historian" by several historians. While disagreeing with some of Moa's theses, the historian Stanley G. Payne has praised his work.

He believed in a conspiracy theory on the authorship of the 11-M Madrid train bombings in 2004.

He has been accused of homophobia by civil rights groups and of being a defender of the Franco regime. In an interview in 2008 he openly refused to condemn Franco's regime. However, he declares in his books that he does not defend the dictatorship but merely criticises its rivals.

He was the editor of the historical journals Tanteos (1988–1990) and Ayeres (1991–1993) and a librarian at the Ateneo de Madrid, a prestigious cultural and literary institute in Madrid and was on its board of directors for three years.

He currently writes for online newspapers such as Libertad Digital .

== Publications ==
- Los orígenes de la guerra civil española (The origins of the Spanish Civil War)
- Los personajes de la República vistos por ellos mismos (The characters of the [Spanish second] republic as viewed by themselves)
- El derrumbe de la segunda república y la guerra civil (The collapse of the second republic and the civil war)
- Una historia chocante – Los nacionalismos vasco y catalán en la historia contemporánea de España (A shocking history – Basque and Catalan nationalism within the contemporary history of Spain)
- Los mitos de la Guerra Civil (Myths of the Civil War)
- La sociedad homosexual y otros ensayos (Homosexual society and other essays)
- Años de hierro. España en la posguerra. 1939–1945" (Iron years, Post-war Spain 1939–1945)
- De un tiempo y de un país, La izquierda violenta (1968–1978) (About a time and a country. The violent left 1968–1978)
- Franco – un balance histórico (Franco – a historical assessment)
- Franco para antifranquistas (Franco for antifrancoist)
- 1934: comienza la guerra civil (1934: civil war begins)
- 1936: el asalto final a la república (1936: final assault on the republic)
- Los crímenes de la guerra civil y otras polémicas (The crimes of the civil war and other controversies)
- Nueva Historia de España (New History of Spain)
