= Julián Casanova =

Spanish historian (born 1956)

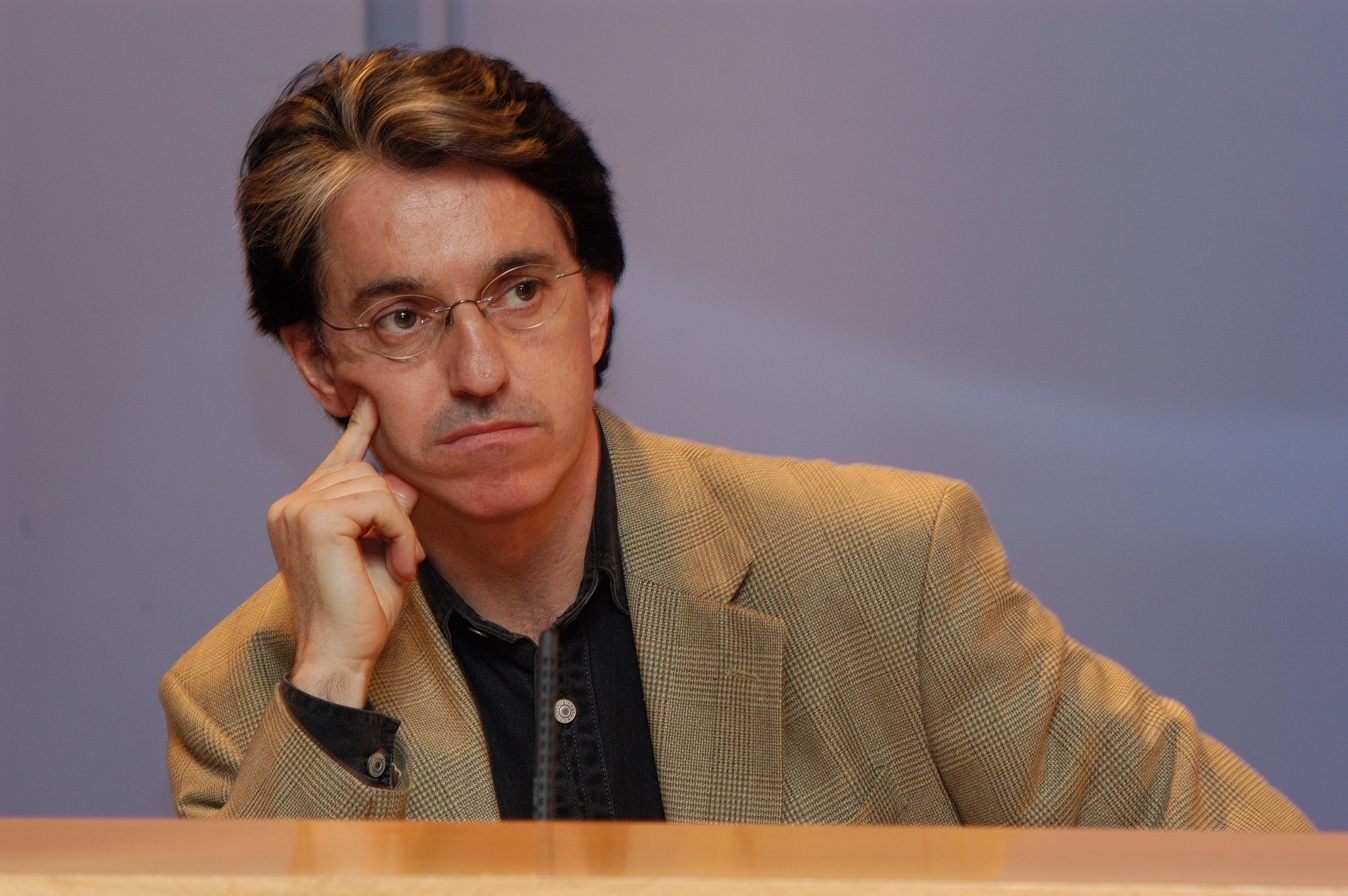
Casanova in 2004

Julián Casanova Ruiz (born 1956 in Valdealgorfa) is a Spanish historian. He teaches contemporary history at University of Zaragoza, and has been a visiting professor in US, UK and Latin America universities as well as a recurring visiting professor at Hungary's Central European University. He is currently a Distinguished Research Fellow at the Weiser Center for Europe and Eurasia, University of Michigan. He's a columnist for El País and frequent talk show guest at radio station Onda Cero.

In 2008 he was nominated to join the panel of experts in the first judicial investigation (conducted by judge Baltasar Garzón) of the Francoism crimes.

== Bibliography ==
- — (2010). The Spanish Republic and Civil War. Oxford University Press.
- —; Gil Andrés, Carlos (2014) [2009]. Twentieth-century Spain. A History. Originally published in Spanish as Historia de España en el siglo XX by Ariel, 2009. Translated by Douch, Martin. Cambridge University Press. ISBN 978-1-107-60267-0. OCLC 870438787.
- — (1997). De La Calle Al Frente (in Spanish). Critica.
  - Translated as Anarchism, the Republic and Civil War in Spain: 1931–1939 by Andrew Dowling and Graham Pollok in 2005.
- — (2011). Europa contra Europa. 1914-1945. Barcelona: Crítica.
- — (2013). España partida en dos. Barcelona: Crítica.
- A Short History of the Spanish Civil War. I.B. Tauris. 2013.
- — (2017). La venganza de los siervos. Rusia 1917. Barcelona: Crítica.
- — (2020). Una violencia indómita. El siglo XX europeo. Barcelona: Crítica.
- _ (2021) A Short History of the Spanish Civil War, revised edition, Bloomsbury, 2021; España partida en dos. Breve Historia de la guerra civil española, Crítica, 2022.
