= La Veu de Catalunya =

Catalan newspaper (1899–1937)

La veu de Catalunya
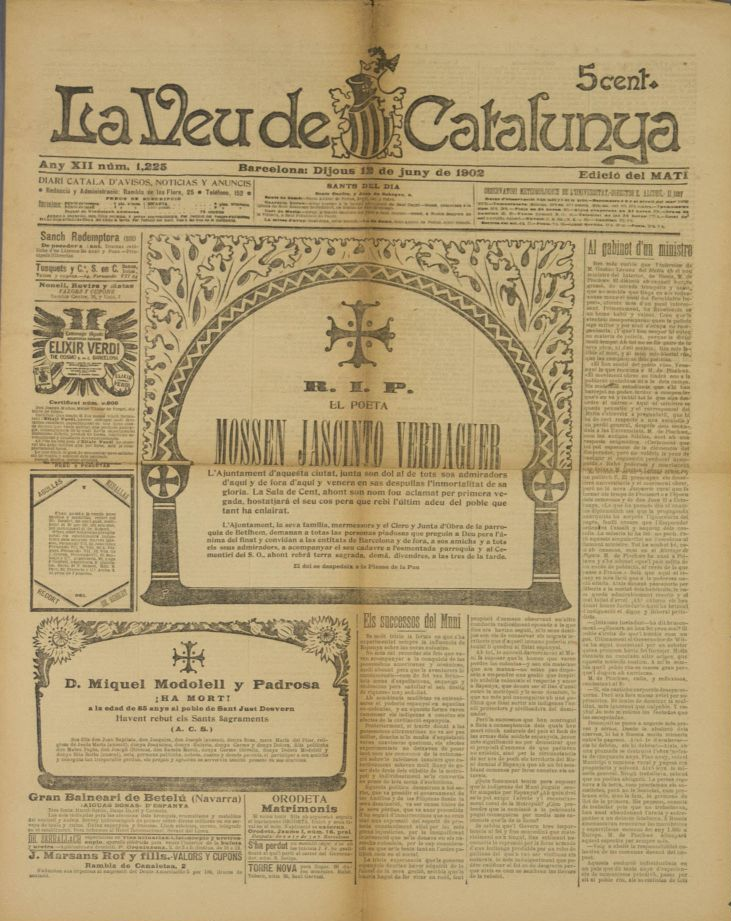
- Founded: 1 January 1899
- Ceased publication: 8 January 1937
- Language: Catalan
- Headquarters: Barcelona
- ISSN: 1577-2764

La Veu de Catalunya (English: "The Voice of Catalonia") was a Catalan newspaper founded by Enric Prat de la Riba that was published in Barcelona from 1 January 1899 to 8 January 1937, with two editions daily.

It was the press organ for the ideological and political program of the Lliga Regionalista, and the conservative editorial line promoted the so-called Autonomia, the normality of the public use of the Catalan language and the Catalan school. From a journalistic point of view, it was a modern newspaper, organized by sections, with correspondents and collaborators in the territory, and a team that combined young people and the best journalists of the time. It was the longest running newspaper in Catalan of the 20th century, with 38 years of daily publication. The header, designed by Domènec i Montaner, showed a quadribarred eagle. Josep Pla and Eugeni Xammar, in their day, and journalism historian Josep Maria Figueres, nowadays, have considered La Veu the best Catalan newspaper ever.

Also under that name, Valentí Almirall's Diari Català had previously been published during one of the periods in which it was suspended, between 30 July and 28 August 1880.

== History ==
The newspaper "La Veu", as it is popularly known, was a continuation of the literary and political weekly of the same name, founded in 1891 by Narcís Verdaguer, Joaquim Cabot and Jaume Collell and published in December 1898, when it became a daily newspaper. The main political and journalistic figures of the future Veu de Catalunya newspaper, such as Francesc Cambó, Lluís Duran i Ventosa, Josep Puig i Cadafalch, Joaquim Rubió i Ors, Joan Sardà i Lloret, were among the writers and contributors. The daily edition was started by Enric Prat de la Riba with a political orientation and in defense of the program of the Regionalist League.

It was suspended in different periods, for articles published in 1900, 1901, 1902 and 1905. In 1902, its director was arrested during the day for reproducing an article in L' independent de Perpinyà on Roussillonese wine makers. The newspaper was also suspended in 1917, when the Assemblea de Parlamentaris (Parliamentary Assembly) was convened, to prevent it from having a written public forum. In all cases, it appeared with other names (La Creu de Catalunya, Diari de Catalunya, La Veu de Barcelona, El Poble Català, Baluard de Sitges or Costa de Ponent) to avoid the ban.

On 25 November 1905, the editorial staff was attacked by a group of soldiers who were upset by a caricature of Junceda, in which he is known as the "Fets del Cu-Cut!" and that this was the beginning of a process of repression of Catalan society through the Llei de Jurisdiccions (Law of Jurisdictions). That event stimulated the creation of Catalan Solidarity, an alliance of Catalan parties that triumphed in the elections to parliament in 1907.

In July 1936, the newspaper installations were intervened, although they continued to be published, but with subtitles that defined the changes in political orientation: Diari de l'autonomia i de la República (Republic and Autonomous Newspaper), Diari antifeixista controlat pel Comitè Obrer (Anti-fascist newspaper controlled by workers' committee) and CNT-Diari antifeixista-AIT (CNT Anti-fascist newspaper AIT).

== Influence ==
La Veu had a remarkably great social and political influence in the journalism of the first third of the 20th century. It was a modern newspaper, divided into sections, which promoted the professionalization of journalism. It had a wide network of collaborators and correspondents around the world. Its journalists created the first ethical manuals and established precise internal instructions for the writing of articles, the contrast of sources and the design of pages.

Its writers include politicians, writers and journalists such as Enric Prat de la Riba, Francesc Cambó, Raimon Casellas, Josep Maria de Sagarra, Joan Maragall, Joaquim Folch i Torres, Ildefons Sunyol i Casanovas, Prudenci Bertrana, Josep Maria Junoy, Eugenio d'Ors (with the pseudonym "Xènius"), Josep Pla, Josep Lleonart i Maragall, Jaume Bofill i Mates ("Puck", "Guerau de Liost", "One"), Josep Carner ("Bellafila", "Caliban", "Two"), Manuel Brunet, Carles Sentís, Irene Polo, Ignasi Agustí, Ferran Agulló ("Pol") and Manuel de Montoliu.

It is worth highlighting the importance of its literary and thought pages, such as the daily collaboration of Xènius with his "Glosari", between 1906 and 1921, the verses of Josep Carner "Rimes de l'hora", the narrative of Narcís Oller, the translations of Sagarra, the articles of Josep Pla, Gaziel, Maragall, etc.

In 1909, Raimon Casellas and Joaquim Folch i Torres created the Pàgina Artística (Artistic Page) for their art reviews. When Casellas committed suicide in 1910, Folch moved to the head of the art section of La Veu and used to sign with the pseudonym "Flama". From this platform, he was one of the first to use the term "Noucentisme", coined by Eugenio d'Ors, a participant in the very definition of the cultural movement of renewal that still did not respond to a specific definition.

Between 1929 and 1930, Llucieta Canyà was the head of the daily section Món feminí (Feminine World), essential to understand the Spanish conservative feminist movement before the Civil War.

Manuel Brunet was in charge of the cultural section. In this section appeared the first 28 chants of Dante's Divine Comedy, translated into Catalanby Josep Maria de Sagarra, with 27 corresponding comments, but the Civil War truncated this enterprise.

In addition to Prat de la Riba, Josep Morató i Grau, Joaquim Pellicena i Camacho and Ramon d'Abadal i de Vinyals were also directors of the newspaper.

== Other contributors ==
- Roser Matheu i Sadó
- Jaume Carrera i Pujal
- Domènec Carles i Rosich
- Dionís Puig i Soler
- Esteve Suñol i Gasòliba
- Salvador Genís i Bech
- Ramon Rucabado i Comerma

== Bibliography ==
- Figueres, Josep M. (2014). La Veu de Catalunya (1899-1937) (in Catalan). Barcelona: Base edicions.
- Guillamet, Jaume (12 July 2014). "Algunes notes sobre La Veu de Catalunya". El pòsit dels dies (in Catalan).
- Vidal i Jansà, Merçe (1991). Teoria i crítica en el Noucentisme: Joaquim Folch i Torres (in Catalan). Institut d'Estudis Catalans i Publicacions de l'Abadia de Montserrat, SA. ISBN 84-7283-174-4.
- Vidal i Jansà, Mercè (2014). "Ressenya biogràfica". IEC.
- Calpena, Enric (14 June 2015). "En guàrdiaǃː 582-"La Veu de Catalunya"". Corporació Catalana de Mitjans Audiovisuals. TV3 a la carta (in Catalan).
