= 1907 Spanish general election =

- 21 April 1907 (Congress); 5 May 1907 (Senate) (Note: The election in the province of Lugo was postponed to 4 August 1907.)

All 404 seats in the Congress of Deputies and 180 (of 360) seats in the Senate 203 seats needed for a majority in the Congress of Deputies
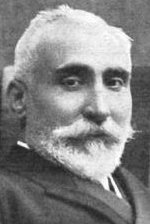

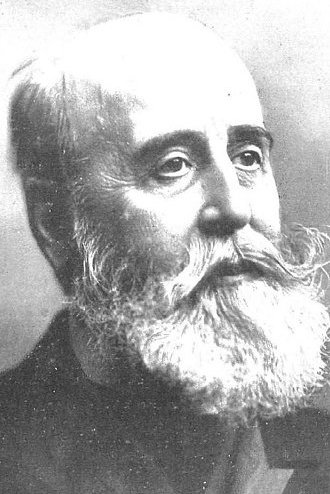

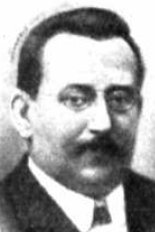

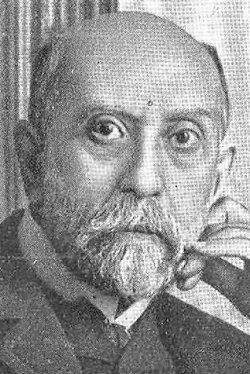

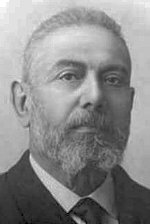

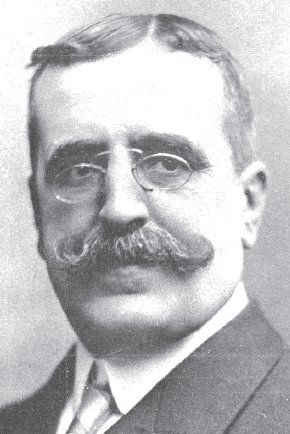
	First party	Second party	Third party
Leader	Antonio Maura	Segismundo Moret	Enric Prat de la Riba
Party	Conservative	Liberal	Solidarity
Leader since	11 November 1903	1906	1906
Leader's seat	Palma	Albuñol	Did not run
Last election	128 D · 53 S (Note: Results for PC (105 deputies and 48 senators), V (16 deputies and 4 senators) and PLR (7 deputies and 1 senator) in the 1905 election.)	226 D · 108 S	18 D · 3 S (Note: Results in Catalonia for LR (7 deputies and 2 senators), UR (6 deputies and 0 senators) and PRF (5 deputies and 1 senator) in the 1905 election.)
Seats won	256 D · 113 S	72 D · 25 S	38 D · 14 S
Seat change	▲128 D · ▲60 S	▼154 D · ▼83 S	▲20 D · ▲11 S
	Fourth party	Fifth party	Sixth party
Leader	Nicolás Salmerón	Matías Barrio y Mier	José Canalejas
Party	Republican	Carlist	Democratic
Leader since	1903	1899	1902
Leader's seat	Barcelona	Cervera de Pisuerga	Alcoy
Last election	19 D · 1 S (Note: Results in the 1905 election, not including Catalonia.)	4 D · 2 S	Did not contest
Seats won	15 D · 1 S	8 D · 3 S	7 D · 6 S
Seat change	▼4 D · 0 S	▲4 D · ▲1 S	▲7 D · ▲6 S
Prime Minister before election
Antonio Maura
Conservative
Prime Minister after election
Antonio Maura
Conservative

A general election was held in Spain on 21 April 1907 (for the Congress of Deputies), and on 5 May 1907 (for the Senate), to elect the members of the 13th Cortes under the Spanish Constitution of 1876, during the Restoration period. All 404 seats in the Congress of Deputies were up for election, as well as 180 of 360 seats in the Senate.

The informal turno system had allowed the country's two main parties—the Conservatives and the Liberals—to alternate in power by determining in advance the outcome of elections through electoral fraud, often facilitated by the territorial clientelistic networks of local bosses (the caciques). The absence of politically authoritative figureheads since the deaths of Cánovas and Sagasta, together with the national trauma from the Spanish–American War, weakened the internal unity of both parties and allowed faction leaders and local caciques to strengthen their positions as power brokers.

Eugenio Montero Ríos had resigned as prime minister in the wake of the ¡Cu-Cut! incident in November 1905. The Liberal Party then entered a period of internal turmoil during which various leaders—Segismundo Moret and José López Domínguez—succeeded themselves in office. The strong rivalry between Moret and José Canalejas saw the "crisis of the letter" (crisis del papelito)—which saw Moret returning to the premiership for a few days—and a transitional government being formed by the Marquis of Vega de Armijo, until the Conservartive Party under Antonio Maura was tasked with the formation of a new government and the calling of a general election by King Alfonso XIII.

The election resulted in a large majority for Maura—who used the system's own mechanisms to secure a disproportionate amount of seats at the expense of the Liberals, breaching a tacit pact between the elites of the two parties—and a huge success for the Catalan Solidarity coalition, formed as a consequence of the political fallout in Catalonia resulting from the ¡Cu-Cut! incident and the approval of the 1906 Law of Jurisdictions.

== Background ==
Following the Bourbon Restoration in 1874, the Spanish Constitution of 1876 enshrined Spain as a semi-constitutional monarchy, awarding the monarch—under the royal prerogative—the right of legislative initiative together with the bicameral Cortes; the capacity to veto laws passed by the legislative body; the power to appoint government members (including the prime minister); the ability to grant or deny parliamentary dissolution, the adjournment of legislative sessions and the signature of royal decrees; as well as the title of commander-in-chief of the armed forces. The monarch would play a key role in the turno system by appointing and dismissing governments, which would then organize elections to provide themselves with a parliamentary majority. This informal system allowed the two major "dynastic" political parties at the time, the Conservatives and the Liberals—characterized as oligarchic, elite parties with loose structures dominated by internal factions, each led by powerful individuals—to alternate in power by means of electoral fraud (pucherazo). This was achieved by assigning candidates to districts before the elections were held (encasillado), then arrange their victory through the links between the Ministry of Governance and the territorial clientelistic networks of provincial governors and local bosses (the caciques), excluding minor parties from the power sharing.

The Restoration system had entered a phase of decline following the national trauma from the Spanish–American War (the "1898 disaster") and the absence of politically authoritative figureheads since the deaths of Antonio Cánovas del Castillo (1897) and Práxedes Mateo Sagasta (1903), weakening the internal unity of both dynastic parties and strengthening the position of faction leaders and local caciques as power brokers. Concurrently, the anti-monarchist opposition became increasingly competitive in urban and some rural districts, partly due to the introduction of universal suffrage since 1890, partly due to the progressive weakening of the pro-government electoral apparatus.

== Overview ==
Under the 1876 Constitution, the Spanish Cortes were conceived as "co-legislative bodies", forming a nearly perfect bicameral system. Both the Congress of Deputies and the Senate exercised legislative, oversight and budgetary functions, sharing almost equal powers, except in budget laws (taxation and public credit)—whose first reading corresponded to Congress—and in impeachment processes against government ministers, where Congress handled indictment and the Senate the trial.

=== Date ===
The term of each chamber of the Cortes—the Congress and one-half of the elective part of the Senate—expired five years from the date of their previous election, unless they were dissolved earlier. The previous elections were held on 10 September 1905 for the Congress and on 24 September 1905 for the Senate, which meant that the chambers' terms would have expired on 10 and 24 September 1910, respectively.

The monarch had the prerogative to dissolve both chambers at any given time—either jointly or separately—and call a snap election. There was no constitutional requirement for concurrent elections to the Congress and the Senate, nor for the elective part of the Senate to be renewed in its entirety except in the case that a full dissolution was agreed by the monarch. Still, there was only one case of a separate election (for the Senate in 1877) and no half-Senate elections taking place under the 1876 Constitution.

The Cortes were officially dissolved on 30 March 1907, with the corresponding decree setting election day for 21 April (Congress) and 5 May 1907 (Senate) and scheduling for both chambers to reconvene on 13 May.

=== Electoral system ===
Voting for the Congress of Deputies was based on universal manhood suffrage, comprising all Spanish national males over 25 years of age with full civil rights, provided they had two years of residence in a Spanish municipality and were not enlisted ranks in active duty. Additional restrictions excluded those deprived of political rights or barred from public office by a final sentence, criminally imprisoned or convicted, legally incapacitated, bankrupt, public debtors, and homeless.

The Congress of Deputies had one seat per 50,000 inhabitants. Of these, those corresponding to larger urban areas were elected in multi-member constituencies using partial block voting: voters in constituencies electing eight seats or more could choose up to three candidates less than the number of seats at stake; in those with between four and eight seats, up to two less; and in those with between one and four seats, up to one less. The remaining seats were elected in single-member districts by plurality voting and distributed among the provinces of Spain according to population. Additionally, universities, economic societies of Friends of the Country and officially organized chambers of commerce, industry and agriculture, had one seat per 5,000 registered voters.

As a result of the aforementioned allocation, 306 single-member districts were established, and each Congress multi-member constituency (a total of 28, electing 98 seats) was entitled the following seats:

Seats	Constituencies
8	Madrid
7	Barcelona
5	Palma, Seville
4	Cartagena
3	Alicante, Almería, Badajoz, Burgos, Cádiz, Córdoba, Granada, Huelva, Jaén, Jerez de la Frontera, La Coruña, Las Palmas, Lugo, Málaga, Murcia, Oviedo, Pamplona, Santa Cruz de Tenerife, Santander, Tarragona, Valencia, Valladolid, Zaragoza

Voting for the elective part of the Senate was based on censitary suffrage, comprising Spanish male householders of voting age, residing in a Spanish municipality, with full political and civil rights, who met either of the following:

- Being qualified electors (such as archbishops, bishops and cathedral chapter members, in the archdioceses; full academics, in the royal academies; university authorities and professors, in the universities; or provincial deputies);
- Being elected as delegates (either by members with three years of seniority (in the economic societies of Friends of the Country; or by major taxpayers for direct taxes and local authorities, in the local councils).

180 Senate seats were elected using indirect, two-round majority voting. Delegates chosen by local councils—each of which was assigned an initial minimum of one delegate, with one additional delegate for every six councillors—voted for senators together with provincial deputies. The provinces of Barcelona, Madrid and Valencia were allocated four seats each, and the rest three each, for a total of 150. The remaining 30 seats were allocated to special institutional districts (one each), including major archdioceses, royal academies, universities, and economic societies, (Note: The following were considered as the major districts in each category: Archdioceses: Burgos, Granada, Santiago de Compostela, Seville, Tarragona, Toledo, Valencia, Valladolid, and Zaragoza.; Royal academies: Spanish; History; Fine Arts of San Fernando; Exact, Physical and Natural Sciences; Moral and Political Sciences; and Medicine.; Universities: Madrid, Barcelona, Granada, Oviedo, Salamanca, Santiago, Seville, Valencia, Valladolid, and Zaragoza.; Economic societies of Friends of the Country: Madrid, Barcelona, León, Seville, and Valencia.) each elected by their own qualified electors or delegates. Another 180 seats consisted of senators in their own right (such as the monarch's offspring and the heir apparent once coming of age (16), grandees of Spain with an income of Pts 60,000, certain general officers—captain generals and admirals—the Patriarch of the Indies and archbishops, and the heads of higher courts and state institutions (Note: These comprised the Council of State, the Supreme Court, the Court of Auditors and the Supreme Council of War and Navy.) after two years of service), as well as senators for life directly appointed by the monarch.

The law provided for by-elections to fill vacant seats during the legislative term. At least two vacancies were required to trigger a by-election in Congress multi-member constituencies.

== Candidates ==
=== Nomination rules ===
For the Congress, secular Spanish males of voting age, with full civil rights, could run for election. Causes of ineligibility applied to those excluded from voting or meeting any of the incompatibility rules for deputies, as well as to:

- Public contractors, within their relevant territories;
- Holders of a number of territorial posts (such as government-appointed positions, not including government ministers and Central Administration employees; local and provincial employees; and provincial deputation members), within their areas of jurisdiction, during their term of office and up to one year afterwards.

For the Senate, eligibility was limited to Spanish males over 35 years of age not under criminal prosecution, disfranchisement nor asset seizure, and who either qualified as senators in their own right or belonged (or had belonged) to certain categories:

- Provided an income of Pts 7,500: the presidents of the Senate and the Congress; deputies serving in three different congresses or eight terms; government ministers; bishops; grandees of Spain not eligible as senators in their own right; and various senior officials after two years of service (such as certain general officers—lieutenant generals and vice admirals—and members of higher courts and state institutions); heads of diplomatic missions abroad (ambassadors after two years, and plenipotentiaries after four); heads and full academics in the royal academies; chief engineers; and full professors with four years of service;
- Provided an income of Pts 20,000 or being taxpayers with a minimum quota of Pts 4,000 in direct taxes (paid two years in advance): Spanish nobility; and former deputies, provincial deputies or mayors in provincial capitals or towns over 20,000;
- Having served as senators before the promulgation of the 1876 Constitution.

Other ineligibility provisions for the Senate also applied to a number of territorial officials within their areas of jurisdiction, during their term of office and up to three months afterwards; public contractors; tax collectors; and public debtors.

Incompatibility rules barred representing multiple constituencies simultaneously, as well as combining:

- The role of senator with other legislative roles (deputy, senator and local councillor, except those in Madrid; and provincial deputies within their respective provinces); or with any public post not explicitly permitted under Senate eligibility requirements;
- The role of deputy with any other civil, military or judicial post, with exceptions—and as many as 40 deputies allowed to simultaneously benefit from these—including a number of specific posts based in Madrid, such as any of the aforementioned ones (provided a public salary of Pts 12,500); senior court officials; university authorities and professors; chief engineers; and general officers.

== Results ==
=== Congress of Deputies ===
← Summary of the 21 April 1907 Congress of Deputies election results →
Parties and alliances	Popular vote		Seats
Parties and alliances	Votes	%	Seats
Conservative Party (PC)			256
Liberal Party (PL)			72
Catalan Solidarity (SC)			38
Republican Union (UR)			15
Traditionalist Communion (Carlist) (CT)			8
Monarchist Democratic Party (PDM)			7
Integrist Party (PI)			3
Anti-Solidarity Republicans (RAS)			2
Independents (INDEP)			3
Total			404
Votes cast / turnout			
Abstentions			
Registered voters			

Seats
PC	63.37%
PL	17.82%
SC	9.41%
UR	3.71%
CT	1.98%
PDM	1.73%
PI	0.74%
RAS	0.50%
INDEP	0.74%

=== Senate ===
← Summary of the 5 May 1907 Senate of Spain election results →
Parties and alliances	Seats
Conservative Party (PC)	113
Liberal Party (PL)	25
Catalan Solidarity (SC)	14
Monarchist Democratic Party (PDM)	6
Traditionalist Communion (Carlist) (CT)	3
Integrist Party (PI)	3
Republican Union (UR)	1
Anti-Solidarity Republicans (RAS)	1
Independents (INDEP)	5
Archbishops (ARCH)	9
Total elective seats	180

Seats
PC	62.78%
PL	13.88%
SC	7.78%
PDM	3.33%
CT	1.67%
PI	1.67%
UR	0.56%
RAS	0.56%
INDEP	2.78%
ARCH	5.00%

=== Distribution by group ===
Summary of political group distribution in the 13th Restoration Cortes (1907–1910)
Group	Parties and alliances	C	S	Total
PC	Conservative Party (PC)	254	110	369
PC	Basque Dynastics (Urquijist) (DV)	1	2	369
PC	Anti-Liberal Catholic Alliance (ACA)	1	1	369
PL	Liberal Party (PL)	72	25	97
SC	Regionalist League (LR)	13	5	52
SC	Federal Republican Party (PRF)	9	3	52
SC	Traditionalist Communion (Carlist) (CT)	6	3	52
SC	Republican Union (UR)	5	2	52
SC	Republican Nationalist Centre (CNR)	4	0	52
SC	Independents (INDEP)	1	0	52
SC	Integrist Party (PI)	0	1	52
UR	Republican Union (UR)	15	1	16
PDM	Monarchist Democratic Party (PDM)	7	6	13
CT	Anti-Liberal Catholic Alliance (ACA)	5	1	11
CT	Traditionalist Communion (Carlist) (CT)	3	2	11
PI	Integrist Party (PI)	2	1	6
PI	Anti-Liberal Catholic Alliance (ACA)	1	1	6
PI	Catholic League (LC)	0	1	6
RAS	Republican Union (UR)	2	1	3
INDEP	Independents (INDEP)	2	4	8
INDEP	Independent Catholics (CAT)	1	1	8
ARCH	Archbishops (ARCH)	0	9	9
Total		404	180	584

== Bibliography ==
Legislation

- Ley mandando que los distritos para las elecciones de Diputados a Cortes sean los que se expresan en la división adjunta (PDF) (Law). Madrid Gazette (in Spanish). 1 January 1871.
- Constitución de la Monarquía Española (PDF) (Constitution). Madrid Gazette (in Spanish). 30 June 1876.
- Ley electoral de Senadores (PDF) (Law). Madrid Gazette (in Spanish). 8 February 1877.
- Ley electoral de los Diputados a Cortes (PDF) (Law). Madrid Gazette (in Spanish). 28 December 1878.
- Ley enumerando los empleos con los cuales es compatible el cargo de Diputado a Cortes (PDF) (Law). Madrid Gazette (in Spanish). 7 March 1880.
- Ley dividiendo la provincia de Guipúzcoa en distritos para la elección de Diputados a Cortes (PDF) (Law). Madrid Gazette (in Spanish). 23 June 1885.
- Ley dividiendo el distrito electoral de Tarrasa en dos, que se denominarán de Tarrasa y de Sabadell (PDF) (Law). Madrid Gazette (in Spanish). 18 January 1887.
- Ley reformando el art. 4º. de la ley de Incompatibilidades (PDF) (Law). Madrid Gazette (in Spanish). 31 July 1887.
- Ley fijando la división de la provincia de Álava en distritos electorales para Diputados a Cortes (PDF) (Law). Madrid Gazette (in Spanish). 10 July 1888.
- Ley electoral para Diputados a Cortes (PDF) (Law). Madrid Gazette (in Spanish). 26 June 1890.
- Ley disponiendo que las primeras y sucesivas elecciones que se verifiquen en la provincia de Zamora se dividirá en siete distritos en la forma que se expresa (PDF) (Law). Madrid Gazette (in Spanish). 18 June 1895.
- Leyes aprobando la división electoral de las provincias de León y Vizcaya (PDF) (Law). Madrid Gazette (in Spanish). 2 August 1895.
- Leyes aprobando la división electoral en las provincias de Sevilla y de Barcelona (PDF) (Law). Madrid Gazette (in Spanish). 5 July 1898.
- Real decreto disponiendo el número de Senadores que han de elegir las provincias que se citan (PDF) (Royal Decree). Madrid Gazette (in Spanish). 16 March 1899.
- Ley mandando que en lo sucesivo sean cuatro los Diputados a Cortes que elegirá la circunscripción electoral de Cartagena (PDF) (Law). Madrid Gazette (in Spanish). 7 August 1899.
- Ley estableciendo una circunscripción para elegir tres Diputados a Cortes, que la constituirán los cuatro partidos judiciales de Ayamonte, Hueva, Moguer y la Palma, con todas las poblaciones que de ellos forman parte (PDF) (Law). Madrid Gazette (in Spanish). 24 March 1902.
- Ley sancionada por S. M. formando un solo distrito electoral para Diputados a Cortes con los de Las Palmas y Guía (PDF) (Law). Madrid Gazette (in Spanish). 5 April 1904.
- Real decreto declarando disuelto el Congreso de los Diputados y la parte electiva del Senado, y disponiendo que las Cortes se reúnan en Madrid el día 13 de Mayo próximo (PDF) (Royal Decree). Madrid Gazette (in Spanish). 30 March 1907.

Other

- Soldevilla, Fernando (1906). El Año Político 1905 (in Spanish). Madrid: National Library of Spain.
- Fernández Almagro, Melchor (1943). "Las Cortes del siglo XIX y la práctica electoral" (PDF). Revista de Estudios Políticos (in Spanish) (9–10). Madrid: Centre for Political and Constitutional Studies: 383–419. ISSN 0048-7694.
- Dendle, Brian John (1986). "Galdós in context: The Republican Years, 1907-1914". Anales Galdosianos (21). Alicante: Miguel de Cervantes Virtual Library: 33–44. ISSN 0569-9924.
- Calero, Antonio María (1987). "La prerrogativa regia en la Restauración: teoría y práctica (1875-1902)" (PDF). Revista de Estudios Políticos (in Spanish) (55). Madrid: Centre for Political and Constitutional Studies: 273–315. ISSN 0048-7694.
- Ortega Álvarez, Luis; Santaolaya Machetti, Pablo (1996). "Evolución histórica del sistema electoral español". Revista de las Cortes Generales (in Spanish). 37. Cortes Generales: 65–107. doi:10.33426/rcg/1996/37/784. ISSN 0213-0130.
- Martorell Linares, Miguel Ángel (1997). "La crisis parlamentaria de 1913-1917. La quiebra del sistema de relaciones parlamentarias de la Restauración" (PDF). Revista de Estudios Políticos (in Spanish) (96). Madrid: Centre for Political and Constitutional Studies: 137–161. ISSN 0048-7694.
- Martínez Ruiz, Enrique; Maqueda Abreu, Consuelo; De Diego, Emilio (1999). Atlas histórico de España. El Reinado de Alfonso XIII (1902-1931) (in Spanish). Vol. 2. Bilbao: Ediciones KAL. pp. 121–132. ISBN 9788470903502.
- Armengol i Segú, Josep; Varela Ortega, José (2001). El poder de la influencia: geografía del caciquismo en España (1875-1923) (in Spanish). Madrid: Marcial Pons. pp. 655–776. ISBN 9788425911521.
- García Muñoz, Montserrat (2002). "La documentación electoral y el fichero histórico de diputados". Revista General de Información y Documentación (in Spanish). 12 (1): 93–137. ISSN 1132-1873.
- Carreras de Odriozola, Albert; Tafunell Sambola, Xavier (2005) [1989]. Estadísticas históricas de España, siglos XIX-XX (PDF) (in Spanish). Vol. 1 (II ed.). Bilbao: Fundación BBVA. pp. 1072–1097. ISBN 84-96515-00-1. Archived from the original (PDF) on 24 September 2015.
- Martínez Relanzón, Alejandro (2017). "Political Modernization in Spain Between 1876 and 1923". Annales Universitatis Mariae Curie-Skłodowska, Sectio K. 24 (1). Madrid: Maria Curie-Skłodowska University: 145–154. doi:10.17951/k.2017.24.1.145. S2CID 159328027.
- Serrano Lahoz, Manuel (2020). Los partidos republicanos durante la Restauración (1874-1931) (PDF) (BA thesis) (in Spanish). University of Zaragoza.
- Royal Academy of History (2022). "Historia Hispánica". Historia Hispánica (in Spanish).
