= Sonia Alins =

Spanish visual artist and illustrator

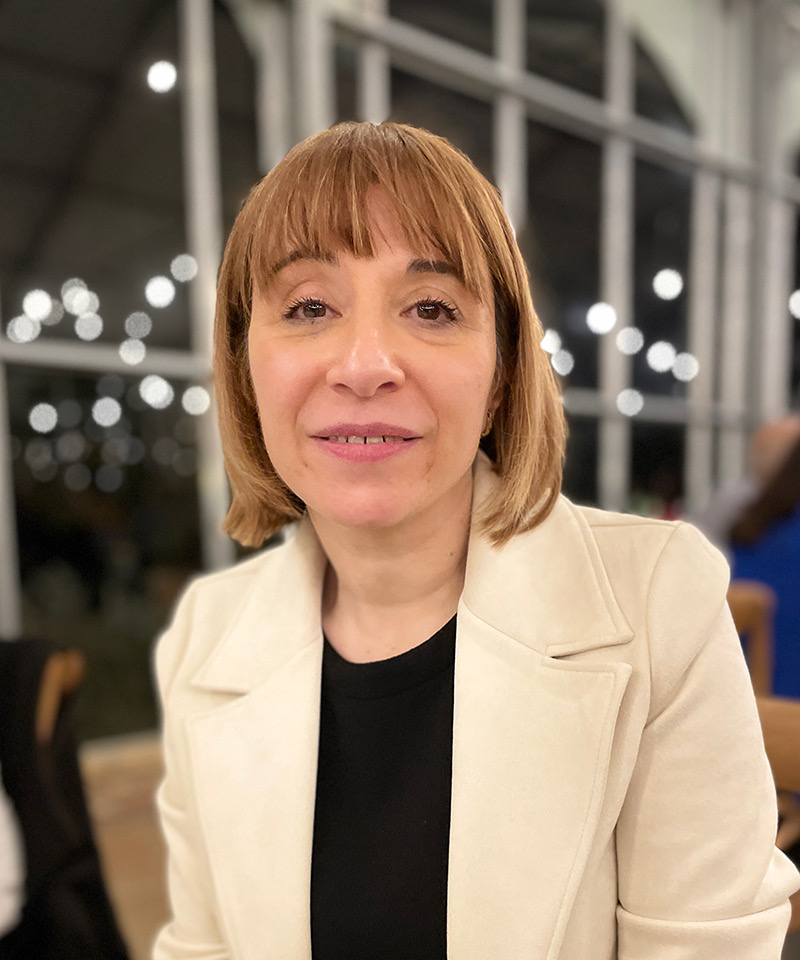
- Born: Sonia Alins Miguel; 1974 (age 51–52); Lleida (Catalonia, Spain)
- Education: Bachelor of Fine Arts (University of Salamanca) Master's Degree in Illustration (Massana School, Barcelona)
- Occupations: Artist and illustrator
- Awards: Gold Medal awarded by the Society of Illustrators. New York, 2021.
- Website: https://soniaalinsart.com

Sonia Alins Miguel (Lleida, 1974) is a Spanish visual artist and illustrator.

In 2021, she received a Gold Medal at the Illustrators 64 international competition, awarded by the Society of Illustrators (New York City, US).

== Biography ==
Sonia Alins studied Fine Arts at the University of Salamanca (Spain), and obtained a degree in the specialisation of graphic design in 1997. In 2009, she completed an illustration postgraduate course at Massana School (Barcelona).

In 1998, she began working in Madrid as a professional illustrator in her own studio, Alins Ilustración, along with her partner, Juanjo Barco. Beside him, she has developed a prolific professional career in the world of illustration with clients from several publishers and from a wide range of companies, from the textile industry to board games.

In 2003, she returned to her hometown, Lleida, from where she has continued her professional career.

In 2011, she received the Junceda Award, granted by the Professional Association of Illustrators of Catalonia (APIC), for the best children's fiction book with The Princess and the Dragon (published by Parramón); and, in 2013, she won the Junceda Award again, this time for the best illustrated educational project with the audiovisual tales created for Artspire's art schools in Shanghai (China).

In 2014, Sonia Alins showed her personal artistic production for the first time in an exhibition with artist Menxu Fernández at the Espai Cavallers Gallery in Lleida, where she revealed an oneiric universe full of graphic poetry and with the woman as the absolute protagonist. In this exhibition, she also presented her first works of the series "Dones d'aigua" (water women), which marks much of her later production.

In 2021, she received a Gold Medal from the Society of Illustrators in New York for "The Beautiful Red Reefs", her contribution, during the previous year, to the "Studio Collection" notebooks series by Moleskine, in which she collaborated with various international illustrators.

Also in 2021, she exhibited her work individually outside of her country for the first time, at the Contemporary by U Gallery in Taipei (Taiwan). Under the title "Oceanids", she showed her interest in concepts such as femininity, motherhood, feminism, love and nature.

== Artistic style ==
Sonia Ains' artistic language is intimately related to Surrealism and visual poetry, with a link to both her vital and oneiric experiences.

The protagonists of her creations are almost always women. They connect with the female iconography of Romanticism (such as Jean-Auguste-Dominique Ingres's odalisques or John Everett Millais's Ophelia), with the Art Deco movement (Tamara de Lempicka) or with the symbolism of Gustav Klimt.

Since 2016, her work focuses on the creation of artworks where drawing goes beyond two dimensions, with collages made of transparent layers and other materials (fabric, feathers, wool, paper or plastic), which find their inspiration in the art of Yves Klein and Joseph Cornell, and that serve the author to create pieces with ethereal atmospheres and a subtle representation of three-dimensionality.

Her most recognised collection, "Dones d’Aigua", is a series of delicate pieces that show compact figures of great proportions that emerge from an indefinite aquatic environment. In these, she explores, in a special and suggestive way, concepts such as surrealism, visual poetry and feminism. Sonia Alins plays with the idea of transparency and blur, establishing different levels of perception and providing depth to the pieces, thanks to a planned and minimalist combination of the materials.

For the artist, water is a supernatural and powerful force, capable of generating anguish, pain and despair, in the same way that it can also be a source of happiness, joy, inner peace and love. In her works, Sonia Alins uses water mainly as a central means of expression of the feelings of their protagonists and the author's herself.

== Exhibitions ==
- 2014. Exhibition "Les Somiants", with artist Mentxu Fernández. Espai Cavallers Gallery (Lleida, Spain).
- 2016. Collective exhibition "En Femení". Espai Cavallers gallery (Lleida, Spain).
- 2017. Collective exhibition "Salon Des Beaux Arts". Carrousel du Louvre (Paris, France).
- 2018. Individual exhibition “Somnis Emergents”. Urgell Regional Museum, Tàrrega (Lleida, Spain).
- 2019. Individual exhibition "Emerging Dreams". Espai Cavallers Gallery (Lleida, Spain).
- 2019. Collective exhibition "London-Kyoto Art Award 2019", organised by East West Art Link. La Galleria Pall Mall (London, England).
- 2020. Individual exhibition "Mar Interior". Échale Guindas Gallery (Madrid, Spain).
- 2021. Individual exhibition "Oceanids". Contemporary by U Gallery (Taipei, Taiwan).
- 2022. Collective exhibition "Illustrators 64 Annual Competition". The Museum of Illustration (New York, USA).

== Awards and honours ==
- 2012. Junceda Award in the children's fiction category for the illustrations for the book La princesa y el dragón (The Princess and the Dragon), published by Parramón. Awarded by the APIC (Professional Association of Illustrators of Catalonia). Barcelona, Spain.
- 2013. Junceda Award, together with Juanjo Barco, for the best illustrated educational project with the illustrated audiovisual stories for Artspire (Shanghai, China). Awarded by the APIC (Professional Association of Illustrators of Catalonia). Barcelona, Spain.
- 2016. Selected as a finalist at the World Illustration Awards. Awarded by the Association of Illustrators (AOI) of the United Kingdom. London, United Kingdom.
- 2017. Second Prize in the "Contemporary-II" category at the East-West Award Competition 2017. Awarded by East West Art Link. London, United Kingdom.
- 2017. Bronze A’Design Award at the annual A’ Design Award & Competition. Milano, Italy.
- 2017. Two Gold Medals in the Salon des Beaux Arts 2017 competition. Awarded by the Société Nationale des Beaux-Arts. Paris, France.
- 2018. Third place at the London-Kyoto FAPDA 2019 competition. Awarded by East West Art Link. London, United Kingdom.
- 2018. Gold Award at the Global Illustration Award competition. Awarded by the Frankfurt Book Fair. Frankfurt, Germany.
- 2019. Gold Award in the category of illustration ("Design Lotus") and Silver Award in the category of best use of illustration ("Print Craft Lotus") at the ADFEST 2019 competition. Bangkok, Thailand.
- 2019. Award of Excellence at the 60th edition of the Communication Arts illustration Annual. Awarded by Communication Arts magazine. San Francisco Bay (California), USA.
- 2021. Award of Excellence at the 62nd edition of the Communication Arts illustration Annual. Awarded by Communication Arts magazine. San Francisco Bay (California), USA.
- 2021. Gold Medal at the Illustrators 64 competition. Awarded by the Society of Illustrators. New York, USA.
- 2021. Award of Excellence at the 63rd edition of the Communication Arts illustration Annual. Awarded by Communication Arts magazine. San Francisco Bay (California), USA.
- 2022. Best of the Best award in the free category of the Hiiibrand Illustration Awards 2021. China.
