= Gaietà Cornet =

Gaietà Cornet may refer to:

- Gaietà Cornet i Palau, the artistic director of the Cu-Cut! magazine
- Gaietà Cornet Pàmies, born August 22, 1963, a retired 400 metres runner from Spain
