= En Patufet =

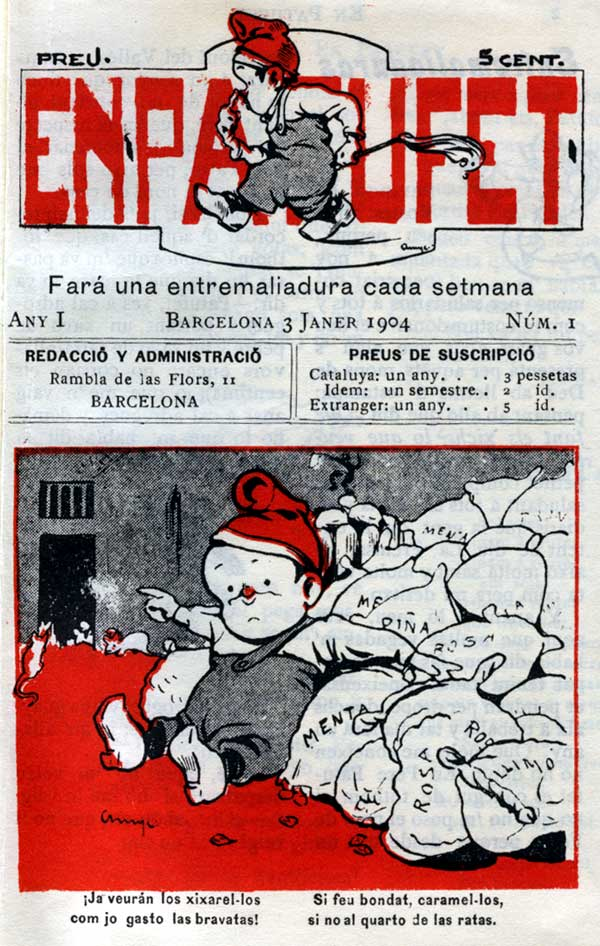
- Cover of the first issue of En Patufet
- Frequency: Weekly
- Founded: 1904
- Final issue: 1938
- Country: Spain
- Based in: Barcelona
- Language: Catalan

En Patufet was an illustrated children's magazine, written in Catalan, published in Barcelona, Catalonia (Spain), between 1904 and 1938. Later, between 1968 and 1973, it was resumed under the name Patufet. It had a great popularity, to the point that the word patufet was used generically to refer to the illustrated magazines for children. It was the Catalan weekly magazine with the most circulation (65,000) and readers weekly (325,000).

The figure of Patufet on the magazine was first drawn by Antonio Montañola.

== Writers and Illustrators ==
Some of the writers and illustrators that worked with En Patufet:

- Lola Anglada
- Josep Maria Folch i Torres
- Joan Vila i Pujol, Joan D'Ivori
- Manuel Marinelo
- Gaietà Cornet i Palau
- Joan Llaverias i Labró
- Joan García Junceda
- Xavier Bonfill i Trias, Jordi Català
- Antoni Batllori i Jofré
- Josefina Tanganelli, Abel
- Ricard Opisso
- Carlos Bécquer Domínguez
- Josep Broquetas i Rius
- Lluís Almerich i Sellarés, Clovis Eimeric

== See also ==
- ¡Cu-Cut!
