= Josep Abril i Virgili =

Catalan poet and playwright

Josep Abril i Virgili (1869-1918) was a self-taught Catalan poet and playwright. He specialized in the production of works with easily understood and popular moral lessons, which were publicised through Roman Catholic organizations.

== Publications ==
Abril i Virgili collaborated in the production of several publications such as La Barretina, La Creu de Montseny (The Cross of Montseny), Lo Pensament Català (Catalan Thought), Cu-Cut! and Bon Seny (Good Sense), among others.

Bon Seny was a book on ancestral Catalan wisdom (the famous seny), encouraged by Josep Torras i Bages, the respected Catalan writer and bishop of Vic. Illustrated by Joan Junceda (1881-1948), it contains aphorisms, fables and local humorous sayings (acudits) based on traditional Christian principles. First published in Catalan before the Spanish Civil War, a limited edition was reprinted in 1959. It became a rare collector's item during General Franco's dictatorship when publications in the Catalan language were severely restricted. Nine years after Franco's death it was reprinted by a Roman Catholic publishing house in Barcelona.

== Plays ==
As a playwright, Josep Abril i Virgili is the author of several morality plays that were performed mainly in Catholic associations.

Notable among these are Furor pessebrista (1897), the prose monologue L’Home roig (The Red Man, 1913), the comedy of manners La mort de l’avi (The Death of the Grandfather, 1898), the almost humoristic dialogue D'extrem a extrem (1896), and the dramas Lo roure centenari (The Centennial Oak, 1897), El castell de Montsoliu (The castle of Montsoliu, 1898), Cadena del captiu (Chain of the Captive, 1900), Iselda (1901), and Cami del vici (The Road of Vice, 1912), as well as L’hostal de la Serena, which was included in the collection Lectura popular (Popular Readings).
