= ¡Cu-Cut! =

Catalan humor magazine

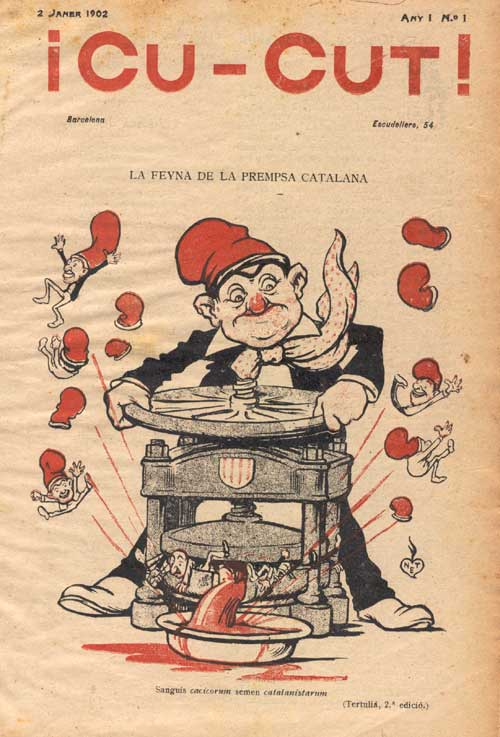
- Cover of the first issue of ¡Cu-cut! with "The Catalan" designed by Gaietà Cornet
- First issue: 1902
- Final issue: 1912
- Country: Spain
- Based in: Barcelona
- Language: Catalan

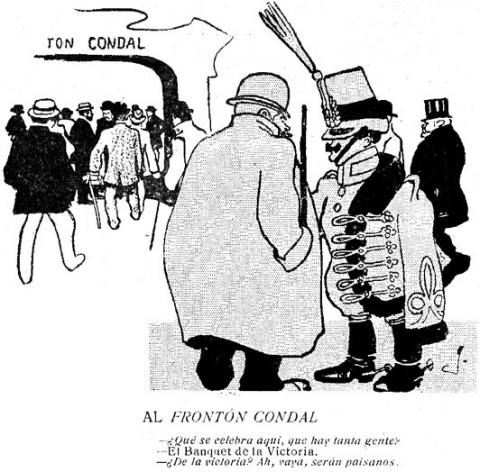
Cartoon by Joan Junceda ridiculing the Spanish Army that led to the attack on the Cu-Cut! head office

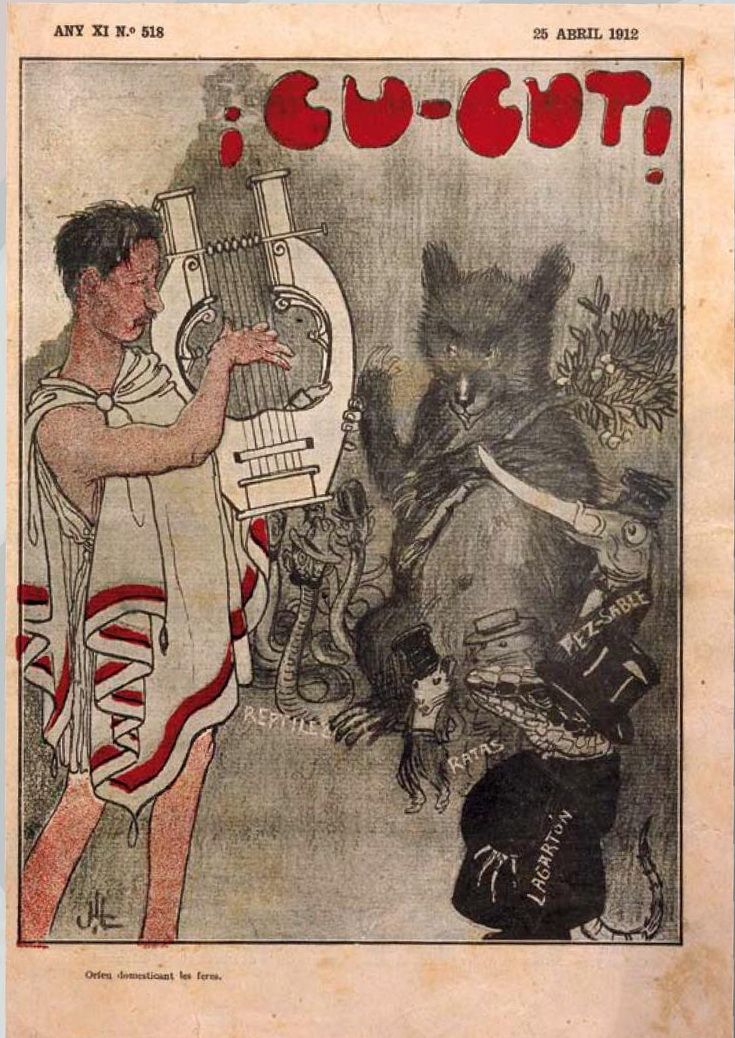
The satirical cover of the magazine that irritated the Lliga Regionalista leadership and brought about its closure

¡Cu-cut! was a Catalan illustrated satirical magazine, written in Catalan. Published in Barcelona between 1902 and 1912, it followed the political line marked by Francesc Cambó's Lliga Regionalista.

== History ==
¡Cu-cut!, named after the cuckoo bird (Catalan: Cucut), was first published on 2 January 1902 and, like El Be Negre magazine that would be published later, it steadfastly opposed Lerrouxism in Spain. Its director was Manuel Folch i Torres and most articles were written by Josep Morató i Grau, Eduard Coca i Vallmajor and Manuel Urgellès, among others such as Josep Abril i Virgili and Vicenç Caldés i Arús. The main illustrators were Joan Llaverias, Joan Junceda, Ricard Opisso, Feliu Elias, nicknamed Apa, Lluís Bagaria, and Lola Anglada. One of the most representative characters of the magazine was "el català" (The Catalan), a small man wearing a barretina drawn by Gaietà Cornet i Palau, the artistic director of the magazine.

The magazine had sixteen pages, usually printed in two colors, edited by Josep Baguñà and printed by Marià Galve. The price was ten cèntims. The literary director was Manuel Folch i Torres, the art director Gaietà Cornet i Palau and the managing director Ramon Pruna, who became a kind of scapegoat for the successive judiciary cases against the magazine and was imprisoned more than once.

On 23 November 1905 the magazine published a caricature by Joan Junceda ridiculing the military. Following this, about 300 officers of the Spanish Army, angry at the magazine for having published the offending cartoon, stormed the Cu-Cut! offices, which were also the offices of En Patufet and La Veu de Catalunya. They caused much destruction in the building, burning the place before leaving.

Under pressure of the military, the Spanish government decreed a five-month suspension of the publication of the magazine, between December 1905 and 28 April 1906. These events led to the passing of the Ley de Jurisdicciones ("Law of Jurisdictions"), which severely restricted freedom of expression in Spain by making speech against "Spain and its symbols"—the Spanish Armed Forces including themselves as one of the symbols— a criminal offence.

Owing to its sharp humor and daring political satire Cu-Cut! became very successful, reaching a peak of 60,000 copies printed. Even then, it was forced to close down in 1912 by the leaders of the Lliga Regionalista, sore at the satirical cover by Joan Llaverias on the 25 April 1912 issue. Following the closure of Cu-Cut! the team of editors and illustrators continued their work at Catalan children's magazine En Patufet.

On the occasion of the first centennial of the closure of the magazine, the Barcelona City Historical Archive (Arxiu Històric de la Ciutat de Barcelona) staged an exhibition and published a catalogue based on the once famous magazine. The exhibition was commissioned by Catalan cartoonist Jaume Capdevila (Kap) and produced with the Associació Tantatinta.

== See also ==
- Joan Junceda
- Ricard Opisso i Sala
- Spanish Republican Army
- Josep Abril i Virgili
