= Republican Union (Spain, 1903) =

Defunct Spanish political party

Republican Union Unión Republicana
- Leader: Nicolás Salmerón
- Founded: 1903
- Dissolved: 1910 (most); 1920 (remnants)
- Succeeded by: Republican Nationalist Federal Union; Radical Republican Party; Republican Party
- Ideology: Progressivism; Republicanism
- Political position: Centre-left

The Republican Union (Spanish: Unión Republicana, UR) was a Spanish republican party founded in 1903 by Nicolás Salmerón.

It participated in the 1903, 1905 and 1907 general elections. Salmerón's decision in 1906 to join the Catalan Solidarity alliance would result in Alejandro Lerroux's split into the Radical Republican Party (PRR), as well as in a number of defections and in the decline of the party. It was mostly dissolved in 1910, being succeeded by the Republican Nationalist Federal Union, though some remnants lingered until 1920.

== See also ==
- Republican Union (Spain, 1893)
- Republican Union (Spain, 1934)

== Bibliography ==
- Martínez Ruiz, Enrique; Maqueda Abreu, Consuelo; De Diego, Emilio (1999). Atlas histórico de España. El Reinado de Alfonso XIII (1902-1931) (in Spanish). Vol. 2. Bilbao: Ediciones KAL. pp. 121–132. ISBN 9788470903502.
- De Miguel Salanova, Santiago (2016). "La Unión Republicana en el corazón de la Monarquía. El triunfo electoral de 1903". Historia Contemporánea (in Spanish) (53). Madrid: University of the Basque Country: 553–591. ISSN 1130-2402.
- Serrano Lahoz, Manuel (2020). Los partidos republicanos durante la Restauración (1874-1931) (PDF) (BA thesis) (in Spanish). University of Zaragoza.
