= Ricard Opisso =

Cartoonist, caricaturist, illustrator and painter from Spain (1880–1966)

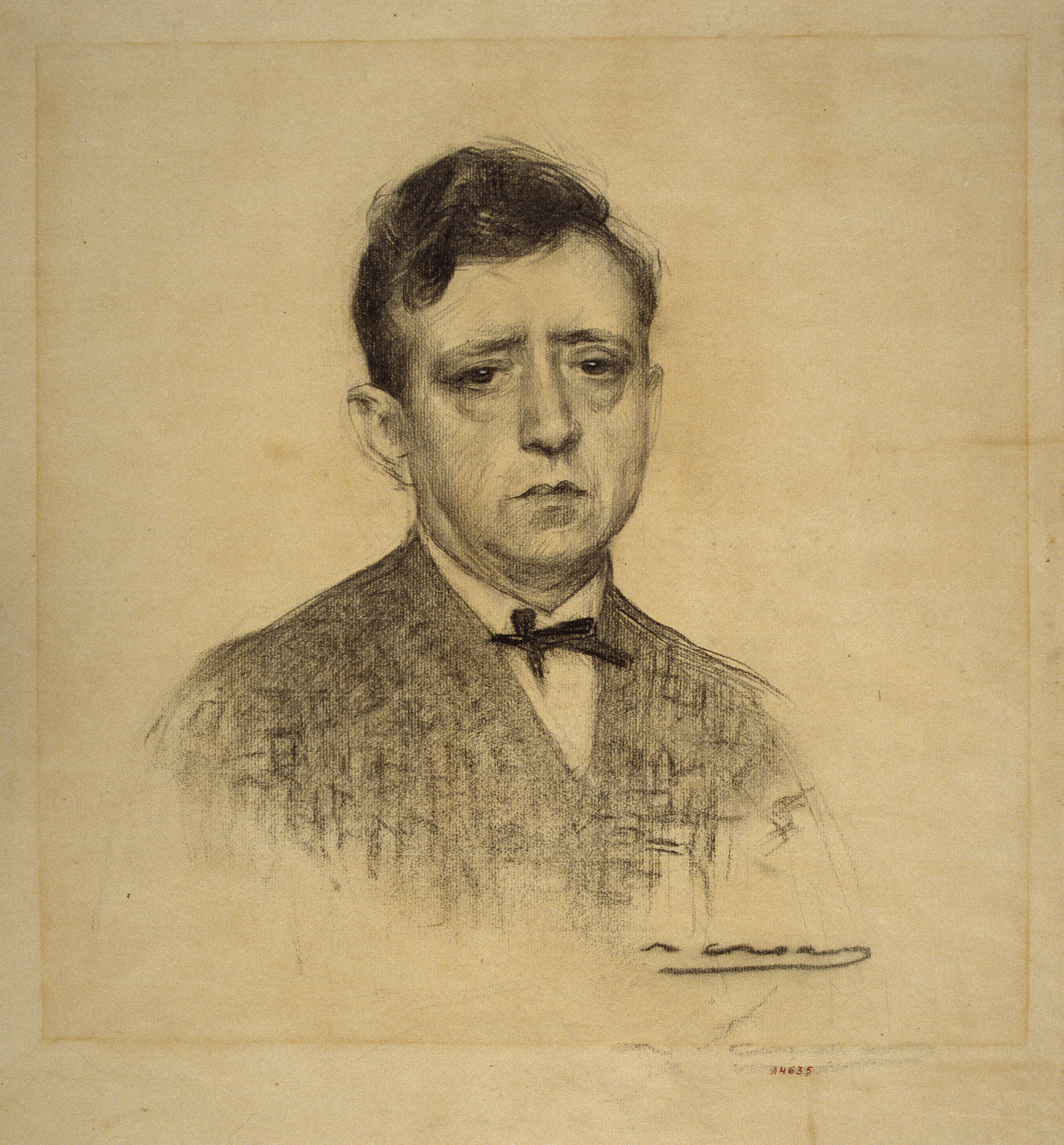
Opisso seen by Ramon Casas (MNAC).

Ricard Opisso (1880–1966) was a Catalan cartoonist, caricaturist, illustrator and painter.

== Biography ==
Son of Alfred Opisso i Viñas, journalist, historian and critic, and of Antonia Sala i Gil, his sister Regina Opisso, was also a writer. He comes from an illustrious family of artists. His paternal grandfather was Josep Opisso i Roig, journalist and director of the Diari de Tarragona, father of the writers Antonia Opisso i Viña and Antoni Opisso i Viña. His maternal great-grandfather was the painter Pere Pau Montaña, his maternal grandfather the fabulist Felipe Jacinto Sala and his maternal uncle, the painter Emilio Sala i Francés. His nephew was Arturo Llorens i Opisso, a writer best known under his pseudonym Arturo Llopis.

Although he was born in Tarragona, his family moved to Barcelona when Opisso was only two years old. In the modernist Barcelona of the late nineteenth century, Opisso worked as an assistant to Antoni Gaudí in the works of the Sagrada Família in Barcelona since 1892. He was linked to Els Quatre Gats group, together with Ramon Casas, Manuel Hugué, Isidre Nonell and Pablo Picasso, among others.

Later he worked as an illustrator in publications such as ¡Cu-cut! (from 1903) and L'Esquella de la Torratxa (from 1912), signing drawings oriented to political satire, which are graphically related to Art Nouveau. Because of the dictatorship of Miguel Primo de Rivera, Opisso abandons political satire and his drawings approach the theme of manners, specializing in popular scenes. His drawings of this era are characterized by presenting motley crowds in popular Barcelona scenes. From this time they date their best-known works for the comic magazine TBO (in which he had begun to collaborate in 1919), where he specialized in the realization of covers. He collaborated with many other publications, such as En Patufet and Pocholo.

In the postwar period, Opisso's pictorial work triumphed in the galleries of Barcelona. In 1953 he received recognition from his hometown at the IV Art Fair of Tarragona.

== Opisso Museum ==
At Astoria Hotel in Barcelona a collection of more than 200 Opisso illustrations is shown continuously since late 2007 on the ground floor (lobby and cafeteria). The drawings and posters come from the private collection of Jordi Clos, president of the hotel chain owner (Derby Hotels Collection). This display of some of his work in the lobby of the Hotel Astoria is just off Avinguda Diagonal in Barcelona.

== See also ==
- ¡Cu-Cut!
- L'Esquella de la Torratxa
