= Republican Party (Spain, 1913) =

Defunct Spanish political party

Republican Party Partido Republicano
- Founded: 1913
- Succeeded by: Republican Union
- Ideology: Progressivism; Republicanism
- Political position: Centre-left

The Republican Party (Spanish: Partido Republicano, PRep) was a Republican Spanish politician party created in 1913 as a re-foundation of the Republican movement, following the disbanding of the Republican Union and the splitting of the Radical Republican Party (PRR), the Republican Nationalist Federal Union (UFNR) and the Reformist Party (PRef) from the Republican–Socialist Conjunction.
