= Josefina Tanganelli Plana =

Spanish painter (1904–1968)

Josefina Tanganelli Plana (1904 in Barcelona – April 19, 1968) was a Catalan cartoonist and painter.

Josefina studied at the La Llotja art school where she developed a tender and soft style, full of innocent humor. Her most famous works were published under the pseudonym 'Abel' in the magazine En Patufet, as well as in the comic supplement of the same publication, Virolet. As a cartoonist her style was influenced by the work of Arturo Moreno and Joan Junceda.

She illustrated a number of stories written by Josep Maria Folch i Torres, such as Les aventures del pobre Friquet (1930). After 1931 she devoted herself to posters and paintings, which were exhibited in Barcelona, the United States, Canada and Germany, as well as in Santo Domingo, where she lived for several years.
