= Gaziel =

Agustí Calvet Pascual
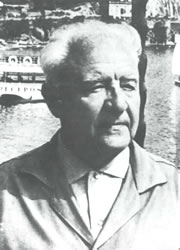
- Born: October 7, 1887; Sant Feliu de Guíxols, Spain
- Died: April 12, 1964 (aged 76); Barcelona, Spain
- Occupations: Journalist, writer and publisher

Agustí Calvet Pascual (Catalan pronunciation: [əɣusˈti kəlˈβɛt]; Sant Feliu de Guíxols; October 7, 1887 – Barcelona; April 12, 1964), known as Gaziel (pronounced [ɡəziˈɛl]), was a Spanish journalist, writer and publisher.

== Life and works ==
=== Before the Spanish Civil War ===
He studied humanities in Barcelona and in Madrid, where he earned his doctorate. His doctoral thesis was on Anselm Turmeda, and was published in 1914 as Fray Anselmo de Turmeda. Heterodoxo español 1352-1423-32?.

He then went to Paris to further his studies and, at the outbreak of the First World War, he acted as war correspondent for La Vanguardia, the most influential newspaper in Barcelona, with such a success that very shortly most of his articles were brought together and published in four successive books: Diario de un estudiante en París (Diary of a student in Paris) (1916), Narraciones de tierras heroicas (Tales of heroic lands) (1916), De París a Monastir (From Paris to Monastir) (1917) and En las líneas de fuego (In the fire lines) (1917); and he became a full-time journalist. It was then when he began to use Gaziel as pseudonym. He had married a French lady in 1914.

After the proclamation of the Second Spanish Republic in 1931, he showed himself as a firm pro-republican, but after 1934 he became increasingly disappointed and anxious over the social and political atmosphere in Spain.

In those years preceding the Spanish civil war Gaziel was appointed editor in chief of La Vanguardia, and he was widely seen as the most incisive political analyst in Spain. At the beginning of the war, in July 1936, he had to flee to France, as his life was in risk due to the political repression led by anarchist and Communist militias, while his home in Barcelona, including his valuable personal library, was sacked.

=== After the Spanish Civil War ===
He was in Brussels when the German invasion in 1940 forced him to return to Spain, where he was received with undisguised hostility by the new Francoist authorities, despite having been the cultural attaché of their Embassy in Belgium and having signed in 1937 a manifesto -promoted by Francesc Cambó- in support of the nationalist side in the Civil War; while Carlos Godó, the owner of La Vanguardia, prevented him from returning to his position in the newspaper. As a consequence he lived in Madrid, as general manager of the Editorial Plus Ultra publishing house.

In the late 1940s, he wrote Meditaciones en el desierto (Meditations in the desert), a depressing view on the situation of Spain and, more generally, of Europe in the postwar years.

In the early 1950s, he travelled through Castile, Galicia and Portugal. As a result of these travels he wrote, and published a decade later, his so-called Iberian trilogy: Portugal lejano (Portugal far away), Castilla adentro (Castile inside) and La península inacabada (The unfinished peninsula), where he mixed the interesting diaries of these trips with his profound reflections on the historical and political coexistence between Portugal, Catalonia and Castile (or Spain in a broader sense), an issue that worried him all along his life.

La peninsula inacabada includes also a very significant extensive soliloquy: While he spends a spring afternoon in the delightful beach of Estoril, he looks sadly over his life and the three wars (First World War, Spanish Civil War, Second World War) he witnessed, and over the contemporary European situation, including the Indochina War where his eldest son was fighting in the ranks of the French Army.

Two professional travels, to Switzerland and Italy, to attend International Publishers Congresses produced two respective books, Seny, treball i llibertat (Sensibleness, work and freedom) and L'home és el tot (The man is everything). In the first one, perhaps his masterpiece, he displayed his absolute admiration for the Swiss political and social structure, that he thought as the ideal answer to the regional complexities of Spain. In the second one he showed himself captivated by the magnificent renaissance art in Florence and took the opportunity to express his most profound aversion to the mass society.

In 1959, after his retirement from Editorial Plus Ultra, Gaziel moved back to Barcelona, where he resumed on a full-time basis his writing activity. His reappearance in the Catalan literary arena, at age 72, surprised the cultural Establishment of Barcelona. Just before his death, in 1964, he finished Història de La Vanguardia (1881–1936) (History of La Vanguardia (1881–1936)), a key book in the history of Spanish journalism and Gaziel's personal settling of scores with Carlos Godó.

In October 2009, a new compilation of Gaziel's articles on the First World War, including several ones not collected in the 1915–1917 books, En las trincheras (In the trenches), was published.

== Catalan vs. Spanish and general mind ==
Book cover of Quina mena de gent som, by Gaziel

Gaziel wrote with equal elegance in either Catalan or Spanish (actually he published eight works in Spanish and fourteen in Catalan, while his almost daily writing in La Vanguardia along twelve years was in Spanish); and while he always saw himself as a genuine Catalan he never fully backed the Catalan nationalism, as he made clear in his posthumous work, Quina mena de gent som (What kind of people are we). Although strictly speaking he did not belong to the Noucentisme Catalan cultural movement, he was close to it and always admired Eugenio d'Ors and, above all, Enric Prat de la Riba.

On the other hand, since his youth he was a wholehearted francophile, a stance that was still increased along the rest of his life, although he always deeply regretted the general French ignorance, or disdain, of the Catalonia under French administration history and specificity or even of its mere existence. On the contrary, in the second half of his life he developed a clear socio-cultural, not political, antiamericanism. Also he took a really negative view of the Latin-American establishments following a very frustrating experience around a publishing business he tried to undertake in Colombia in the early forties.

All in all, Gaziel was, first and foremost, a liberal, conservative, eurocentric bourgeois, and, like many cultured men of his time, he was well aware of the dramatic, and to them disappointing, changes the world had experienced along the first half of the 20th century, to the point that in Portugal far away he wrote: I am not any more a man of the present times, neither of the future.

== See also ==
- Manuel Chaves Nogales

== Bibliography ==
- (In Spanish) Gaziel: En las trincheras, Diëresis, 2009, ISBN 978-84-933997-7-1
- (In Catalan) Manuel Llanas: Gaziel: Vida, periodisme i literatura, Barcelona 1998, ISBN 84-7826-993-2
