= Josep Manuel Anglada =

Spanish mountaineer (1933–2026)

- Born: Joseph Manuel Anglada i Nieto; 5 August 1933; Barcelona, Spain
- Died: 24 April 2026 (aged 92)
- Occupation: Mountaineer
- Relatives: Lola Anglada (aunt)

Josep Manuel Anglada i Nieto (5 August 1933 – 24 April 2026) was a Spanish mountaineer. He was a recipient of the Creu de Sant Jordi (2025).

Anglada died on 24 April 2026, at the age of 92.
