= Seny =

Form of wisdom in Catalan culture

Seny (Eastern Catalan: [ˈsɛɲ]; from Latin sensus) is a form of ancestral Catalan wisdom or sensibleness. It involves well-pondered perception of situations, level-headedness, awareness, integrity, and right action: "a kind of refined good sense and self-realisation."

The opposite of seny is known as rauxa (pronounced [ˈrawʃə]), "impetuosity or capriciousness".

== Cultural significance ==
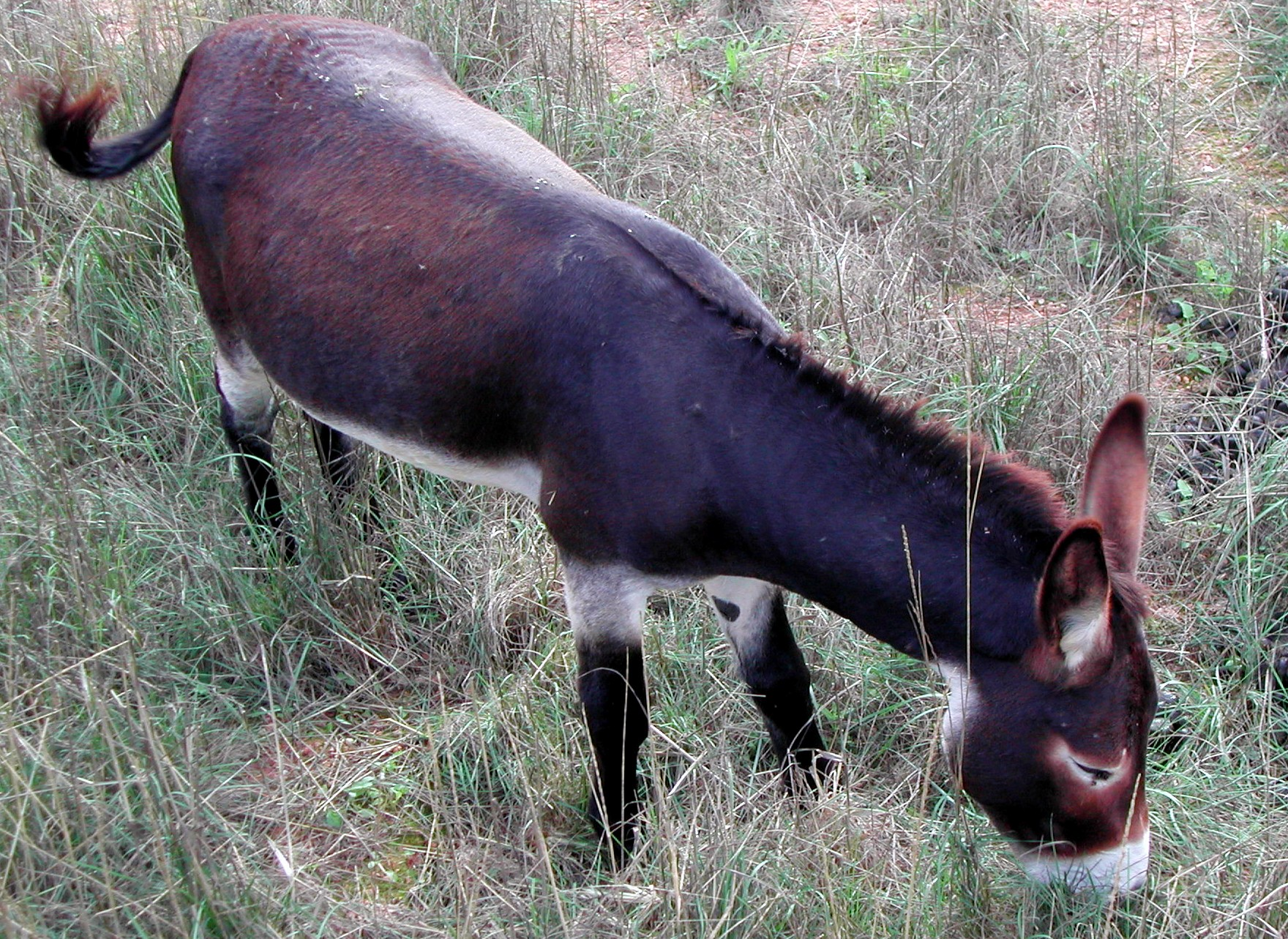
The Catalan donkey is one of the animals that appear in the moral stories of Catalan seny.

Many Catalans consider seny as something unique to their culture, a true Catalan symbol. Seny, as a distinctive feature of Catalan society, is grounded in a set of ancestral local customs that reflect the value system and social norms of traditional rural Catalonia. The values of seny were transmitted from generation to generation without much change by the exemplary behaviour of the elder members of the family, as well as in the form of aphorisms and moral stories. The latter were largely based on Christian values, and their examples and illustrations often included animals and plants that were common in rural Catalonia.

This oral lore caught the attention of Josep Torras i Bages, bishop of Vic, at the end of the 19th century. He became interested in how seny was transmitted from one generation to the next as an oral tradition. He encouraged the writer Josep Abril i Virgili (1869–1918) to gather the moral stories and illustrate them in a book that was published as Bon seny ("Good sense"). This more-or-less representative compilation of moral lessons regarding seny was illustrated by artist Joan Junceda (1881–1948). Published in the Catalan language before the Spanish Civil War, Bon seny became rare under General Francisco Franco, when so much Catalan printed material had been burned and printing in Catalan was severely restricted.

Many of the seny proverbs that defined traditional Catalan values have lost most of their meaning. The reason is the erosion of Christian values as fundamental in today's post-Christian Catalan society, which now sees itself as based largely on secular principles.

Seny is mentioned in the motto of castells, the Catalan tradition of building human towers, as one of the values of that endeavour: Força, equilibri, valor, i seny (strength, balance, courage, and seny).

== Examples ==
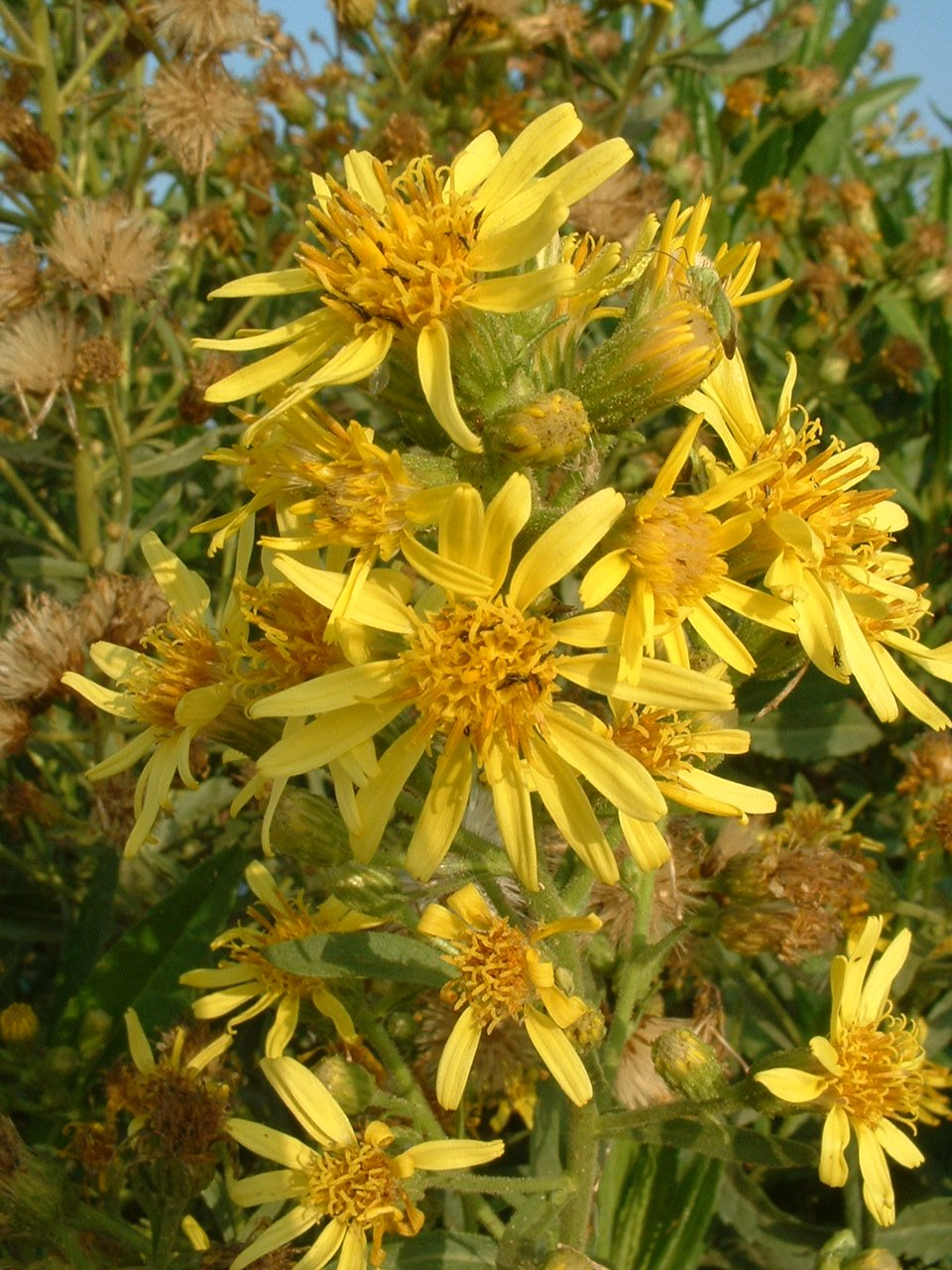
False yellowhead (Dittrichia viscosa) flowers.

Many of the seny aphorisms are short:

Tenen els plaers de la vida,
bona entrada i mala eixida.

Translation:

The pleasures of life have,
a good entrance and a bad exit.

L'home avar és com el porc,
no aprofita fins que és mort.

Translation:

The tight-fisted man is like a pig,
he is only useful after death.

No vos 'nemoreu, amor,
de cap fadrina gallarda
que és com la flor d'olivarda
molt guapa, i dolenta d'olor

Translation:

My dear one, don't fall in love
with any woman who only has good looks,
she is like a false yellowhead flower:
beautiful, but full of stench (unpleasantness).

Home pelut,
o és molt savi o és molt ruc.

Translation:

A hairy man,
is either very wise or (brutish) like a donkey.

The following story, La rata magra or La rata engarjolada, illustrates the dangers of greed:

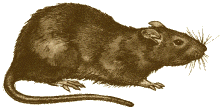
In La rata magra or La rata engarjolada story, the rat illustrates the dangers of greed.

Rata magra veu l'ocell,
tranquil a dintre sa gàbia,
i, amb tota la seva ràbia, s'hi fica;
i el passarell té un surt fort, i es mort.

Rata magra s'el cruspeix,
mes s'ha tant ben atipada,
que, de cop, no té passada.

Moral:
Quan t'atii la maldat,
pensa aixó que es veritat:
Panxa prim hi passaràs,
massa fart t'hi quedaràs.

Translation:

The lean rat sees the bird
sitting quietly in its cage,
and full of anger she enters it
and the bird dies startled.

The lean rat eats it,
but she has filled her belly so much
that, suddenly, she is not able to leave (the cage).

Moral:
When evil tempts you,
think about the following truth:
With a lean belly you will escape
Too full, you will be trapped.

== See also ==
- Josep Torras i Bages
- Reasonable person and moron in a hurry, legal concepts
- Sisu, a Finnish word meaning inner strength

== Bibliography ==
- Ausiàs March, Plena de Seny.
- Cerverí de Girona, Obra moral; Oració de tot dia; Mal dit ben dit; Testament; La faula del rossinyol; sermó; proverbis.
- Jaume Raventós, Proses de bon seny, morals i socials. "Foment de pietat catalana". Barcelona 1923 (4 volumes)
- Josep Maria Folch i Torres, Historietes exemplars, Barcelona 1938 (10 volumes). Reed. Editorial Balmes, 1984.
- Gaziel, Seny, treball i llibertat. 1963
