= Verges, Spain =

Verges
- Municipality
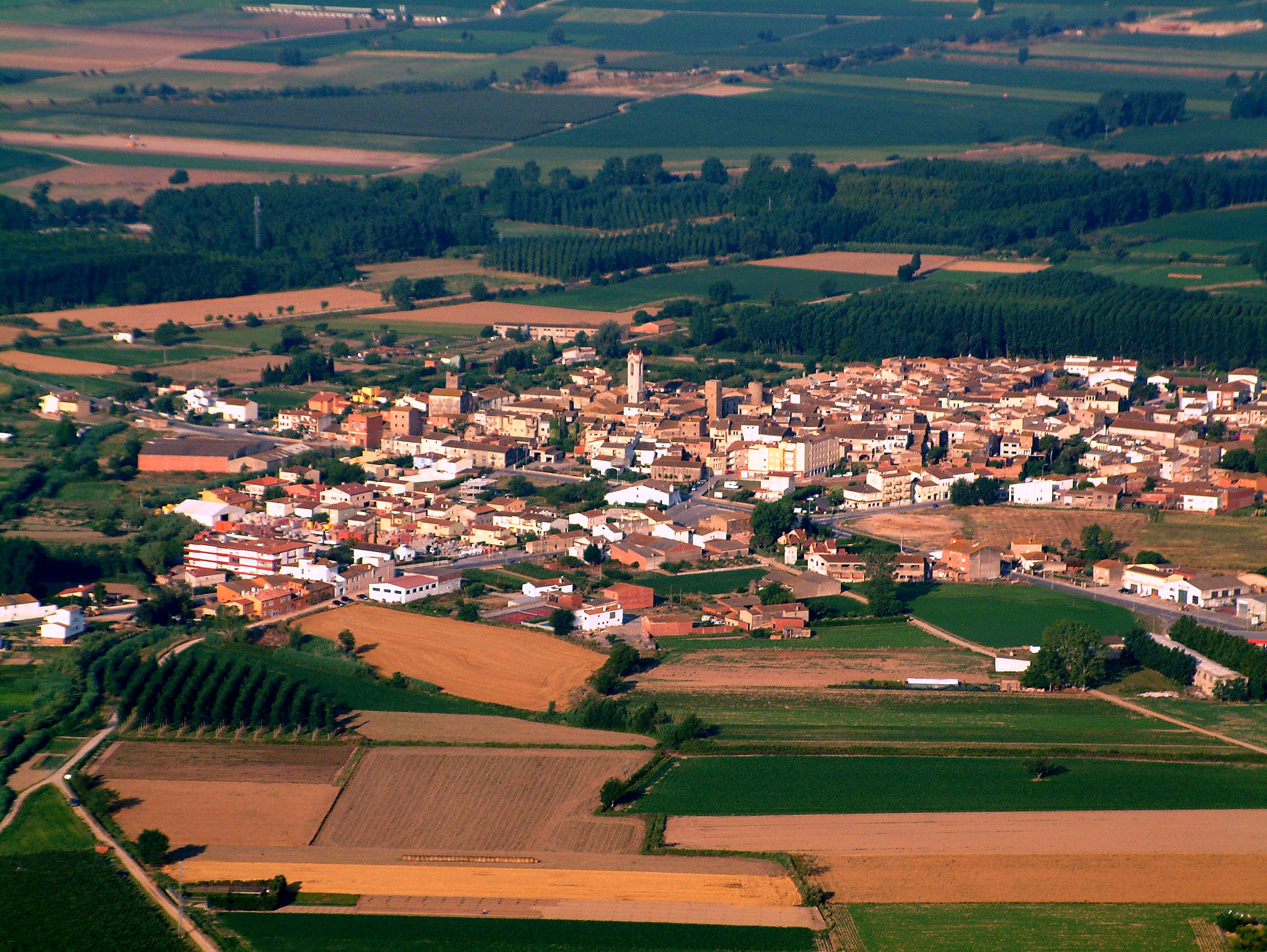
- Verges seen from the air

- Flag Coat of arms

- Location in Catalonia Verges (Spain)
- Coordinates: 42°3′49″N 3°02′52″E
- Country: Spain
- Autonomous community: Catalonia
- Province: Girona
- Comarca: Baix Empordà

Government
  - mayor: Ignasi Sabater Poch (2015)

Area
  - Total: 9.7 km^{2} (3.7 sq mi)
- Elevation: 23 m (75 ft)

Population (2025-01-01)
  - Total: 1,167
  - Density: 120/km^{2} (310/sq mi)
- Demonym(s): Vergelità, vergelitana
- Time zone: UTC+1 (CET)
  - Summer (DST): UTC+2 (CEST)
- Postal code: 17211
- Website: www.verges.cat

Verges (Catalan pronunciation: [ˈbɛrʒəs]) is a municipality in the Province of Girona, Catalonia.

== Features ==
The town is famous for its Dansa de la Mort celebrations every Holy Thursday, probably the last remaining Dance of Death in Europe, performed uninterruptedly since the Middle Ages.

Among the notable citizens born in Verges are:

- Francesc Cambó. (1876-1947) politician
- Lluís Llach. (1948) singer
- Maria Perpinyà Sais. (1901-1994) writer and journalist

== See also ==
- Traditions of Catalonia
