= Republican Nationalist Centre =

Defunct Catalan nationalist party

Nationalist Republican Center Centre Nacionalista Republicà
- Leaders: Jaume Carner i Romeu; Pere Coromines i Montanya
- Founded: 1906
- Dissolved: 1910
- Split from: Regionalist League of Catalonia
- Merged into: Republican Nationalist Federal Union
- Headquarters: Barcelona
- Newspaper: El Poble Català
- Ideology: Republicanism; Catalan nationalism Liberalism; Federalism
- Political position: Centre
- Colours: Red, Yellow
- Slogan: Nacionalisme, Democràcia, República (Nationalism, Democracy, Republic)

The Nationalist Republican Center (Catalan: Centre Nacionalista Republicà, CNR) was a Catalan nationalist and liberal-republican political party in Catalonia, Spain.

== History and ideology ==
The main figures of the party were Ildefons Sunyol, Jaume Carner, Joaquim Lluhí, Santiago Gubern and Eduard Calvet. The party represented the liberal line of catalanism. The main objectives of the CNR were the autonomy of Catalonia, universal suffrage and the establishment of a new Spanish republic.

The party published the daily newspaper El Poble Català. In the 1907 general elections CNR participated in Catalan Solidarity. In 1910 the party joined Republican Nationalist Federal Union.
