= Raimon Casellas =

Catalan author (1855–1910)

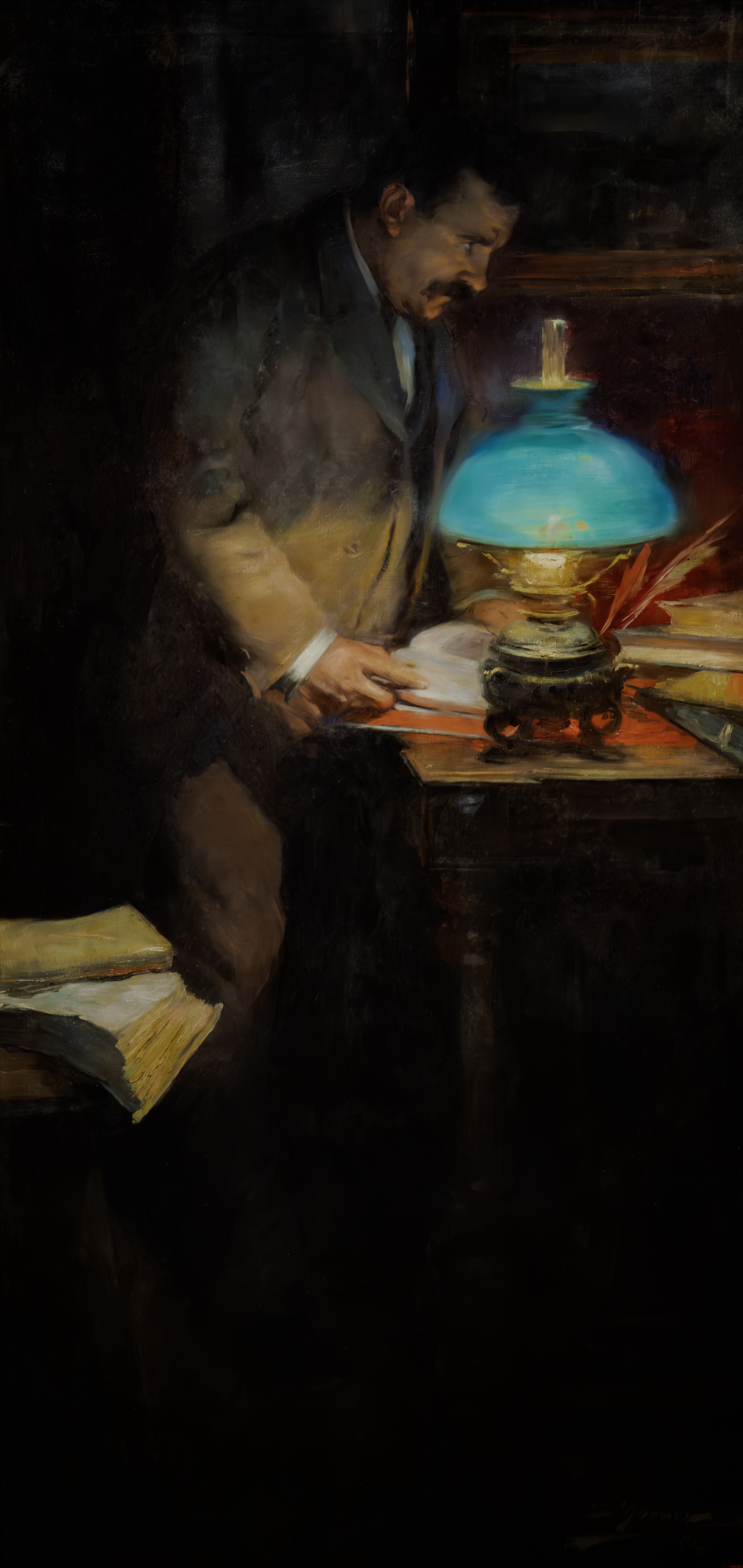
- Portrait of Raimon Casellas by Lluís Graner
- Born: January 7, 1855; Barcelona
- Died: November 2, 1910 (aged 55); Sant Joan de les Abadesses
- Occupation: Writer
- Notable work: Dark Vales (Els sots feréstecs)

Raimon Casellas i Dou (Barcelona, January 7, 1855 – Sant Joan de les Abadesses, November 2, 1910) was a Catalan journalist, art critic, modernisme narrator and collector. Author of Els sots feréstecs (1901), a work considered the first modernist novel in Catalan language and a forerunner of the current known as rural naturalism. Els sots feréstecs was translated to English by Alan Yates and published by Dedalus.

He also wrote articles about aesthetics and art criticism for magazines like L'Avenç, La Vanguardia, L'Esquella de la Torratxa and Cucut!. In 1899 he became the Chief Editor of the newspaper La Veu de Catalunya, and his articles greatly influenced the Catalan artists of his time.

Els sots feréstecs, published in 1901 tells the story of father Llàtzer, a city bishop who is exiled to a rural parish for doctrinal heresy, and the upset that his arrival causes among the inhabitants of Sant Pau de Montmany. The premise of the story is a metaphor for the failure of the intellectual modernist movement to transform society.

Casellas was also an art collector. His collection is now preserved at Museu Nacional d'Art de Catalunya. It includes more than 4,000 drawings and nearly 400 engravings representing the work of 250 artists.

== Works ==
=== Narrative ===
- Els sots feréstecs, 1901(Dark Vales [Els sots feréstecs]. Sawtry: Dedalus Books, 2014. (Trad. Alan Yates)
- Les multituds, 1906
- Llibre d'històries, 1909
- La damisel·la santa, 1918
- Deu-nos aigua, Majestat! (1898)

=== Essay ===
- El dibuixant païsista Lluís Rigalt, 1900.
- Etapes estètiques I, 1916. Societat Catalana d'Edicions.
- Etapes estètiques II, 1918. Societat Catalana d'Edicions.

=== As a historian ===
- La pintura gòtica catalana del segle XV
- Història documental de la pintura catalana (1008–1799)
