= Lola Anglada =

Spanish writer

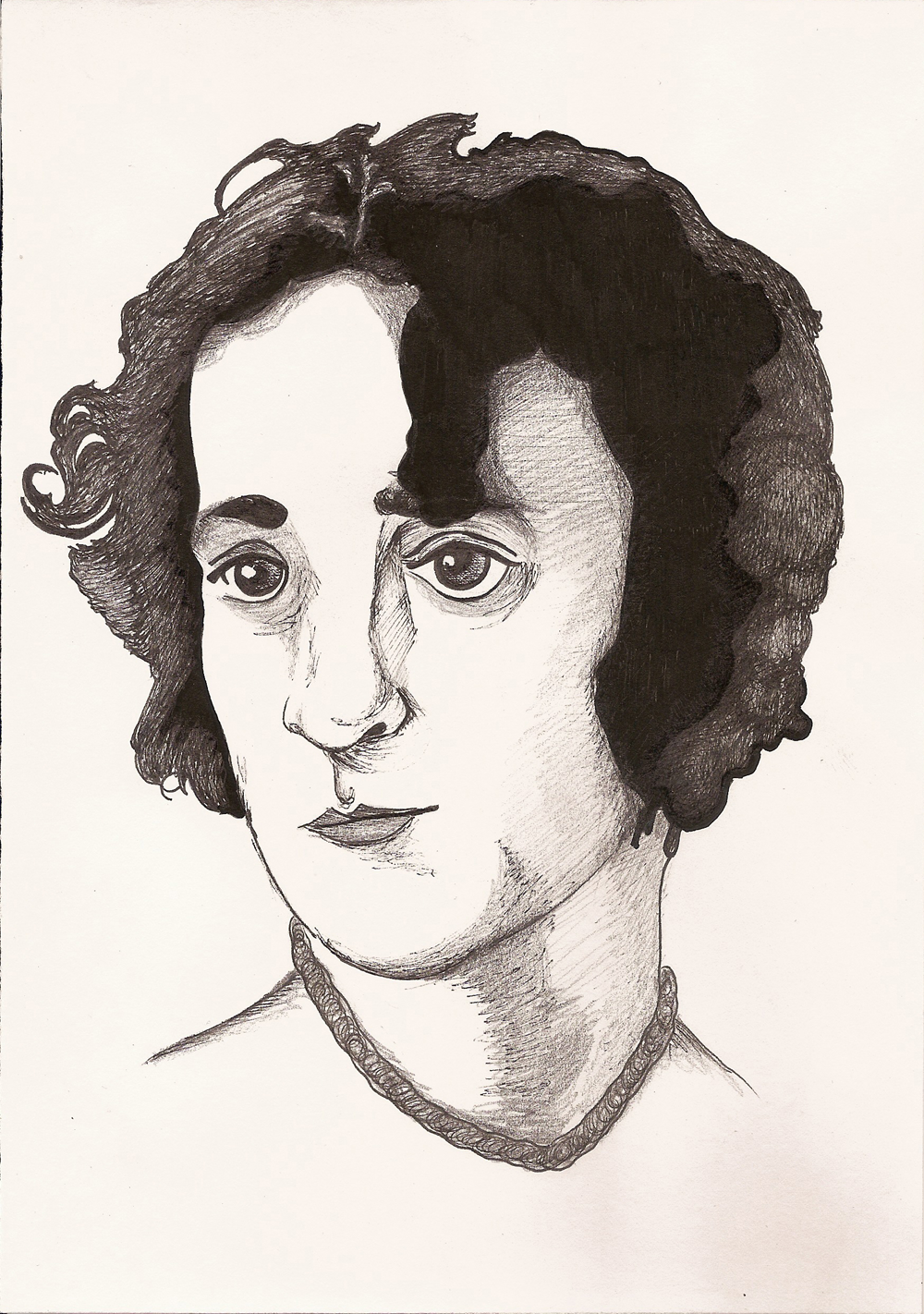
- Portrait of Lola Anglada
- Born: 1893; Barcelona
- Died: 1984 (aged 90–91); Tiana
- Education: La Llotja de Barcelona
- Relatives: Josep Manuel Anglada (nephew)

Dolors Anglada i Sarriera (Catalan pronunciation: [ˈlɔlə əŋˈɡlaðə]; 1893, in Barcelona – 12 September, 1984, in Tiana, Province of Barcelona), commonly known as Lola Anglada, was a Spanish writer, comics artist and illustrator.

== Biography ==
Born to a Barcelona family with strong roots in Tiana, she studied at La Llotja de Barcelona with Joan Llaverias and Antoni Utrillo who helped Anglada get her first exposure in the Sala Parés and in the weekly magazine ¡Cu-Cut!, which published her drawings. Later, and for a short period, would enter the academy Francesc d' A. Galí, where she met Joan Miró and Cristōfol Ricard, with the latter establishing close friendships both personally and artistically

At the end of World War I Anglada traveled to Paris thanks to a French Government scholarship, collaborating with several publishing companies there, where she corresponded with Francesc Macià or Josep Clarà. Infused with democratic values and the Catalanist cause, she organized a request of amnesty for the accused participants in the Garraf Plot against the King Alfonso XIII of Spain.

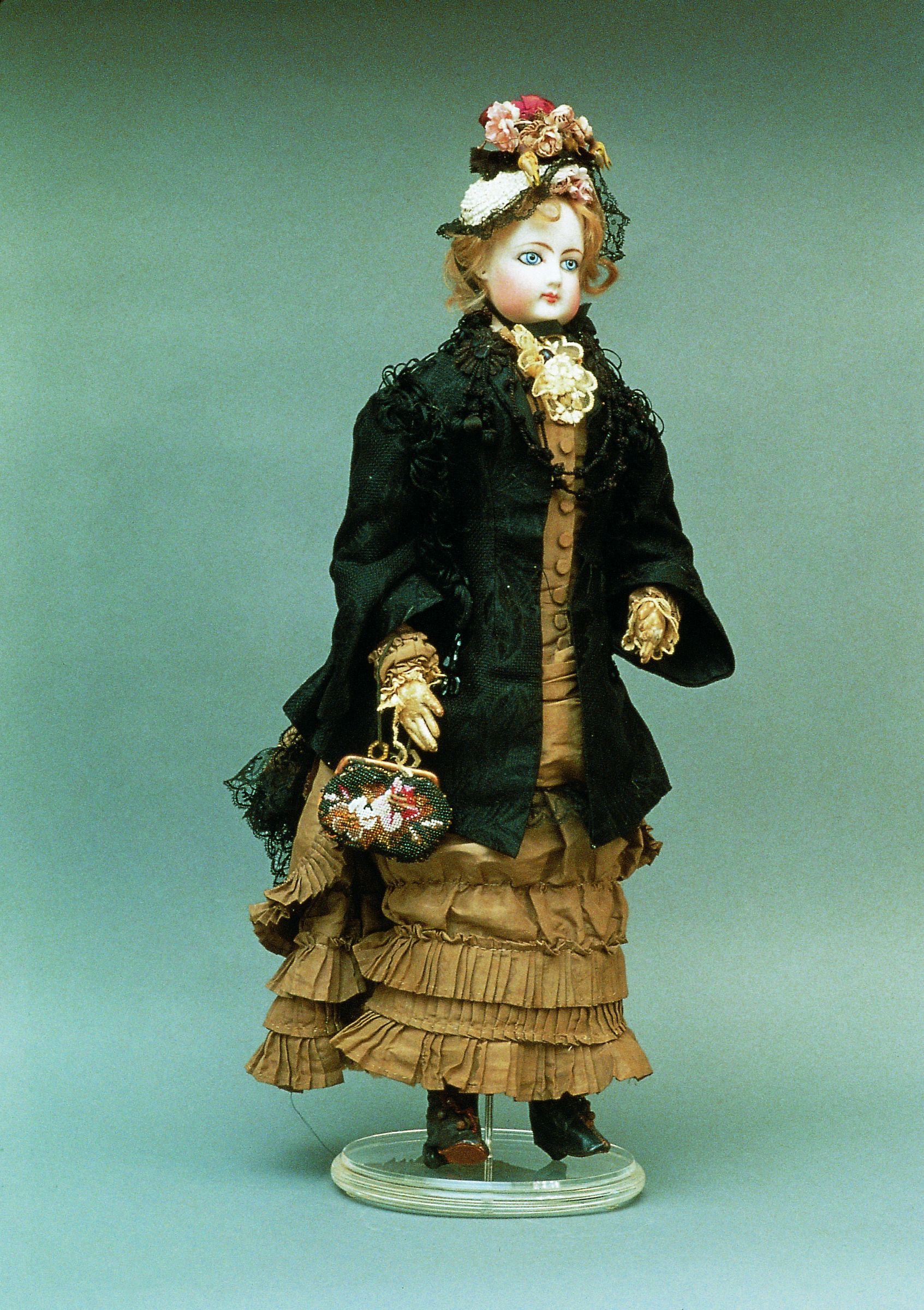
Porcelain doll dressed in vintage, 1877. Doll and Toy Collection Lola Anglada. Can Llopis Romanticism Museum, Sitges, Barcelona

During the Spanish Civil War, she joined the UGT and collaborated in the Commissariat of propaganda, with the latter published in the Spanish Civil War (1937) that perhaps its most iconic and recognized Tale: The smallest of all. Once the war ended, she settled permanently in Tiana, a town in the Maresme region near Barcelona, in the farm family resort where she died on 12 September 1984.

== Artistic works ==
Lola Anglada is considered the last of the classical Catalan illustrators of the 20th century.

She collaborated with several children's magazines, including En Jordi, En Patufet, La Nuri (set up by Anglada herself) and La Mainada. The character that she made most well-known, "El més petit de tots" ("the smallest of all of them"), is a symbol of Catalan national identity of that period.

== Awards and legacy ==
In 1975, she was awarded the Medal of Cultural Merit of the Diputació de Barcelona; in 1980 with the Medal of the Promotion of the Decorative Arts; and in 1981 with the Creu de Sant Jordi, granted by the Generalitat de Catalunya. She gave her collection of dolls to the Diputació de Barcelona, which installed it in the Can Llopis Romanticism Museum of Sitges.

Appointed adoptive daughter of Tiana, the village has also named its private primary school after her. There are also Educational Institutions Lola Anglada in Badalona, L'Hospitalet de Llobregat, Martorell, Esplugues de Llobregat, Vilafranca del Penedès and Lloret de Mar.

Between 1984 and 2003, she granted herself the Prize Lola Anglada of brief stories for boys and girls, summoned by the Caixa de Terrassa and the Town Council of Terrassa.

Her personal collection is preserved in the Photographic Archive of Barcelona.

== Works ==
- Contes del Paradís, 1920
- En Peret, 1928, illustrated by herself.
- Margarida, 1929 illustrated by herself.
- Monsenyor Llangardaix, 1929
- Narcís, 1930
- El més petit de tots, 1937 illustrated by herself.
- La Barcelona dels nostres avis, 1949
- La meva casa i el meu jardí, 1958
- Martinet, 1960
