= José María Vallés y Ribot =

- Josep Maria Vallès i Ribot
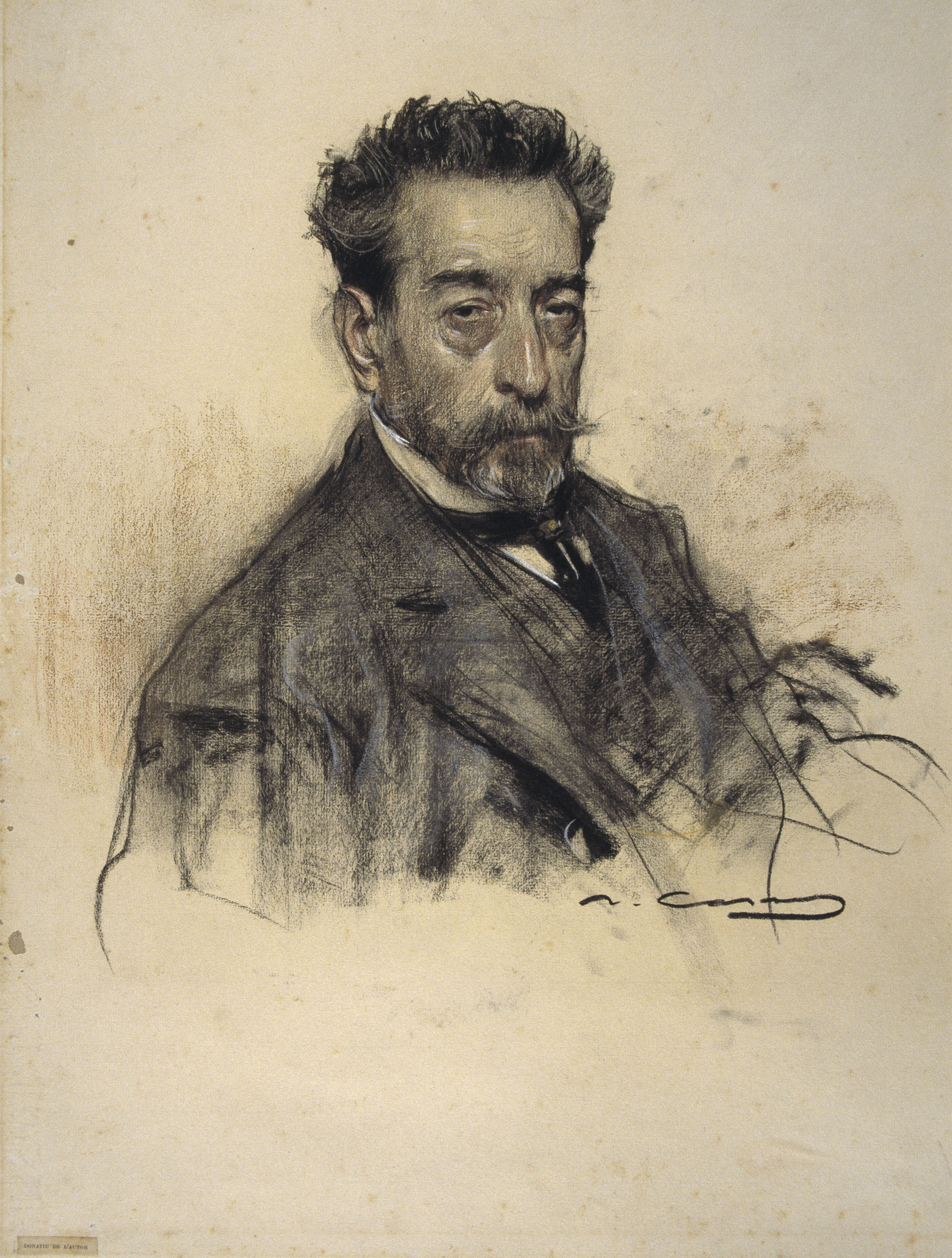
- Portrait of Vallés y Ribot by Ramon Casas

Deputy of the Cortes Generales for Barcelona
- In office 1907 – 1910

Deputy of the Cortes Generales for La Bisbal d'Empordà
- In office 1904 – 1905
- In office 1893 – 1895

Deputy of the Cortes Generales for Figueres
- In office 1891 – 1893

Personal details
- Born: 1849 Barcelona, Spain
- Died: July 31, 1911 (aged 61–62) Vallvidrera, Barcelona, Spain
- Political party: Republican Nationalist Federal Union (1910-1911); Federal Democratic Republican Party (before 1910)

José María Vallés y Ribot (18 July 1849 – 1911), in Catalan Josep Maria Vallès i Ribot, was a Spanish republican politician who served as legislator in the Congress of Deputies a number of times during the Restoration period between 1891 and 1910, and previously during the First Spanish Republic between 1873 and 1874.
