= National trauma =

Collective trauma on a national scale

National trauma is a concept in psychology and social psychology. A national trauma is one in which the effects of a trauma apply generally to the members of a collective group such as a country or other well-defined group of people. Trauma is an injury that has the potential to severely negatively affect an individual, whether physically or psychologically. Psychological trauma is a shattering of the fundamental assumptions that a person has about themselves and the world. An adverse experience that is unexpected, painful, extraordinary, and shocking results in interruptions in ongoing processes or relationships and may also create maladaptive responses. Such experiences can affect not only an individual but can also be collectively experienced by an entire group of people. Tragic experiences can collectively wound or threaten the national identity, that sense of belonging shared by a nation as a whole represented by tradition culture, language, and politics.

In individual psychological trauma, fundamental assumptions about how the individual relates to the world, such as that the world is benevolent and meaningful and that the individual has worth in the world, are overturned by overwhelming life experiences. Similarly, national trauma overturns fundamental assumptions of social identity – something terrible has happened and social life has lost its predictability. The causes of such shatterings of assumptions are diverse and defy neat categorization. For example, wars are not always national traumas; while the Vietnam War is experienced by Americans as a national trauma Winston Churchill famously titled the closing volume of his history of the Second World War Triumph and Tragedy. Similar types of natural disasters can also provoke different responses. The 2016 Fort McMurray Wildfire in Alberta was a collective trauma for not only that local community but also the large Canadian province of Alberta despite causing no direct deaths yet the much larger Peshtigo Fire responsible for thousands of deaths is largely forgotten.

Responses to national trauma also vary. A nation that experiences clear defeat in war which had mobilized the nation to a high degree will almost inevitably also experience national trauma but the way in which that defeat is felt can change the response. The former peoples of the Confederate South in the American Civil War and the German Empire in World War I both created post-war mythologies (the Lost Cause in the former and the Stab-in-the-back Myth in the latter) of "glorious" defeat in unfair fights. The post-war experience of Germany after World War Two, however, is much more complex and provoked reactions from a sense of German national guilt to collective ignorance. A common national response to these traumas is repeated calls for national unity and moral purification, as in the post-9/11 United States or post-war Japan.

== See also ==
- Collective memory
