= Law of Jurisdictions =

Spanish law enacted between 1906 and 1931

The Law of Jurisdictions (Spanish: Ley de Jurisdicciones), whose full name was "Law for the Repression of Crimes against the Motherland and the Army" (Spanish: Ley para la represión de los delitos contra la Patria y el Ejército), was a Spanish law that was in force between 1906 and 1931. It was promoted by Segismundo Moret, president of the Council of Ministers, and the Count of Romanones, Minister of the Governance, with the support of King Alfonso XIII, as a reaction to the events of the ¡Cu-Cut!.

== History ==
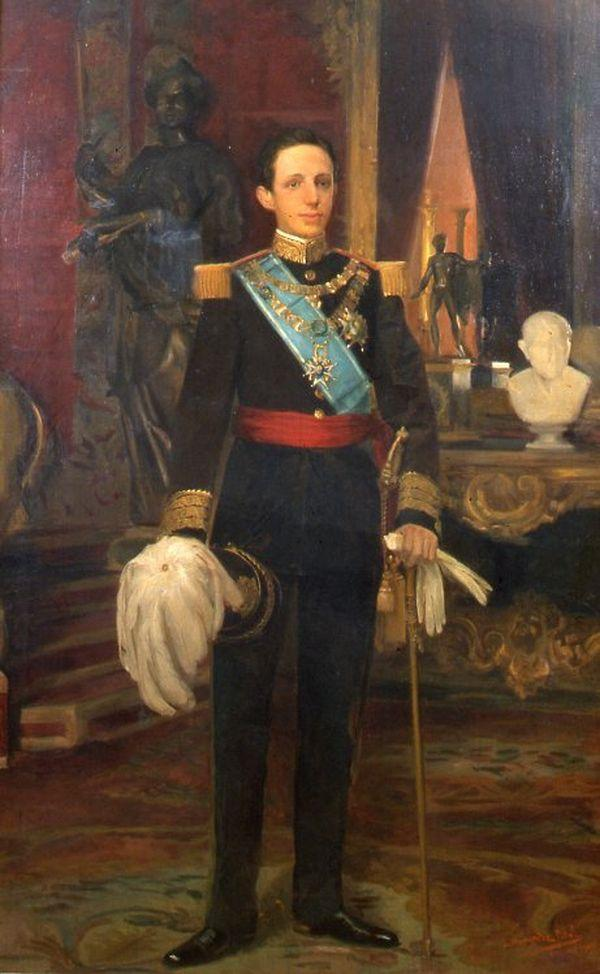
Portrait of Alfonso XIII (1905).

On November 25, 1905, a group of officers assaulted in Barcelona the editorial office of the satirical Catalanist weekly "¡Cu-Cut!" for the publication of a cartoon that ironized about the defeats of the Spanish army. The editorial office of another Catalanist publication, the newspaper La Veu de Catalunya, was also attacked. The commotion caused by these events was enormous. The liberal government of Eugenio Montero Ríos tried to impose his authority over the military and agreed not to yield to the pressure of the general captains who showed their support for the insurrectionist officers, although he declared a state of war in Barcelona on November 29 —apparently pressured by the king—. The monarch finally did not back the government and supported the attitude of the Army, which forced Montero Ríos to resign.

The new government presided over by the other liberal leader Segismundo Moret, who received the King's order to prevent a repetition of the attacks "on the Army and the symbols of the Motherland", set out to satisfy the military —he appointed General Agustín Luque, one of the general captains who had most applauded the assault on the ¡Cu-Cut!— and quickly had the Cortes approve the Law for the Repression of Crimes against the Motherland and the Army —known as the "Law of Jurisdictions"—, by which from that moment on the competencies to judge them passed to the military jurisdiction.

According to the historian Santos Juliá, "the government yielded to the army due to the weight that the Crown placed on the military jurisdiction, with a far-reaching result: the Cortes approved the Law, with which they created a sphere of autonomous military power and set the precedent of yielding to military insubordination. The militarization of public order had taken a giant step forward with this Law". According to the historian Borja de Riquer, "by tolerating the insubordination of the military in Barcelona, the monarch had left the political system exposed to new pressures and blackmail, which considerably weakened the supremacy of civilian power in the face of militarism".

The interpretation of the events by historians Javier Tusell and Genoveva García Queipo de Llano is different. According to them, "the intervention of the King took place once the initial inability of the government [of Montero Ríos] to impose itself had been proven; he then made General Bascarán, the second head of the Military Quarter, go to the barracks in Madrid, calm down the passionate attitudes and promise on behalf of the monarch a modification of the legislation in that sense. [...] The role of the king can be much more aptly described as that of an intermediary between civil and military power in a non-democratic institutional framework in which, if the former made the main decisions, the latter, when he was able to act unanimously, achieved autonomy and even deference".

In response to the impunity in which the perpetrators of the ¡Cu-Cut! and to the Law of Jurisdictions, a great coalition was formed in Catalonia in May 1906, presided over by the old republican Nicolás Salmerón, which included the republicans —except for the party of Alejandro Lerroux—, the Catalanists —the Lliga Regionalista, the Unió Catalanista and the Centre Nacionalista Republicà, a splinter group of the Lliga a few months earlier—, and even the Catalan Carlists.

Its mobilization successes were spectacular with massive demonstrations such as the one held in Barcelona on May 20, 1906, which brought together 200,000 people. In the 1907 general elections, Solidaritat Catalana obtained an overwhelming triumph, winning 41 deputies out of the 44 that corresponded to Catalonia.

From the intelligentsia, Miguel de Unamuno gave a lecture against the law at the Teatro de la Zarzuela on February 23, 1906. However, the law was approved on March 22 and then the Cortes were dissolved. On May 20 the state of exception was lifted in Barcelona and a tribute was paid to the Catalan deputies and senators who had voted against the law.

== Content ==
The law of jurisdictions placed under military jurisdiction oral or written offenses against the unity of the Motherland, the flag and the honor of the army. Several of the articles involved a significant curtailment of public liberties, in particular freedom of expression. This law expanded the field of action of the military jurisdiction over the civilian population, which was not the case in other countries where civilians were under ordinary jurisdiction.

Article 2. Those who by word, in writing, by means of printing, engravings, stamps, allegories, caricatures, signs, shouts or allusions outrage the nation, its flag, national anthem or other emblem of its representation, shall be punished with the penalty of correctional imprisonment.

The same penalty shall be incurred by those who commit the same offenses against the regions, provinces, cities and towns of Spain, and their flags and coats of arms.

Article 3. Those who by word or in writing, by means of printing, engraving or other mechanical means of publication, in stamps, allegories, caricatures, emblems or allusions, insult or offend clearly or covertly the Army or the Navy or institutions, arms, classes or specific corps thereof, shall be punished with correctional imprisonment. Those who by word, in writing, printing, engraving or any other means of publication directly instigate insubordination in armed institutes or to deviate from the fulfillment of their military duties to persons who serve or are called to serve in the national land or sea forces, shall be punished with major arrest in its medium and maximum degrees to correctional imprisonment in its minimum degree.

== Derogation ==
The law of jurisdictions was in force until April 17, 1931, when in one of its first decrees, the Minister of War of the Provisional Government of the Republic, Manuel Azaña, repealed it. The main argument for its repeal was:

In a modern country it should be possible to criticize the Army without fear of prosecution by a special military jurisdiction, nor does the armed Institution need a circumstantial parapet in the relationship with the conscious and free citizenry.

== See also ==
- Military reform of Manuel Azaña
- ¡Cu-Cut! incident

== Bibliography ==
- De Riquer, Borja (2013). Alfonso XIII y Cambó. La monarquía y el catalanismo político (in Spanish). Barcelona: RBA. ISBN 978-84-9006-594-5.
- García Rodríguez, José (2013). Conspiración para la Rebelión militar del 18 de julio de 1936 (del 16 de febrero al 17 de julio) (in Spanish). Madrid: Sílex. ISBN 978-84-7737-748-1.
- Juliá, Santos (1999). Un siglo de España. Política y sociedad (in Spanish). Madrid: Marcial Pons. ISBN 84-9537903-1.
- Moreno Luzón, Javier (2009). "Alfonso XIII, 1902-1931". Restauración y Dictadura. Vol. 7 Historia de España dirigida por Josep Fontana y Ramón Villares (in Spanish). Barcelona: Crítica/Marcial Pons. ISBN 978-84-4423-921-8.
- Tusell, Javier; García Queipo de Llano, Genoveva (2002) [2001]. Alfonso XIII. El rey polémico (in Spanish) (2nd ed.). Madrid: Taurus. ISBN 84-306-0449-9.
