= Joan Junceda =

Spanish illustrator (1881–1948)

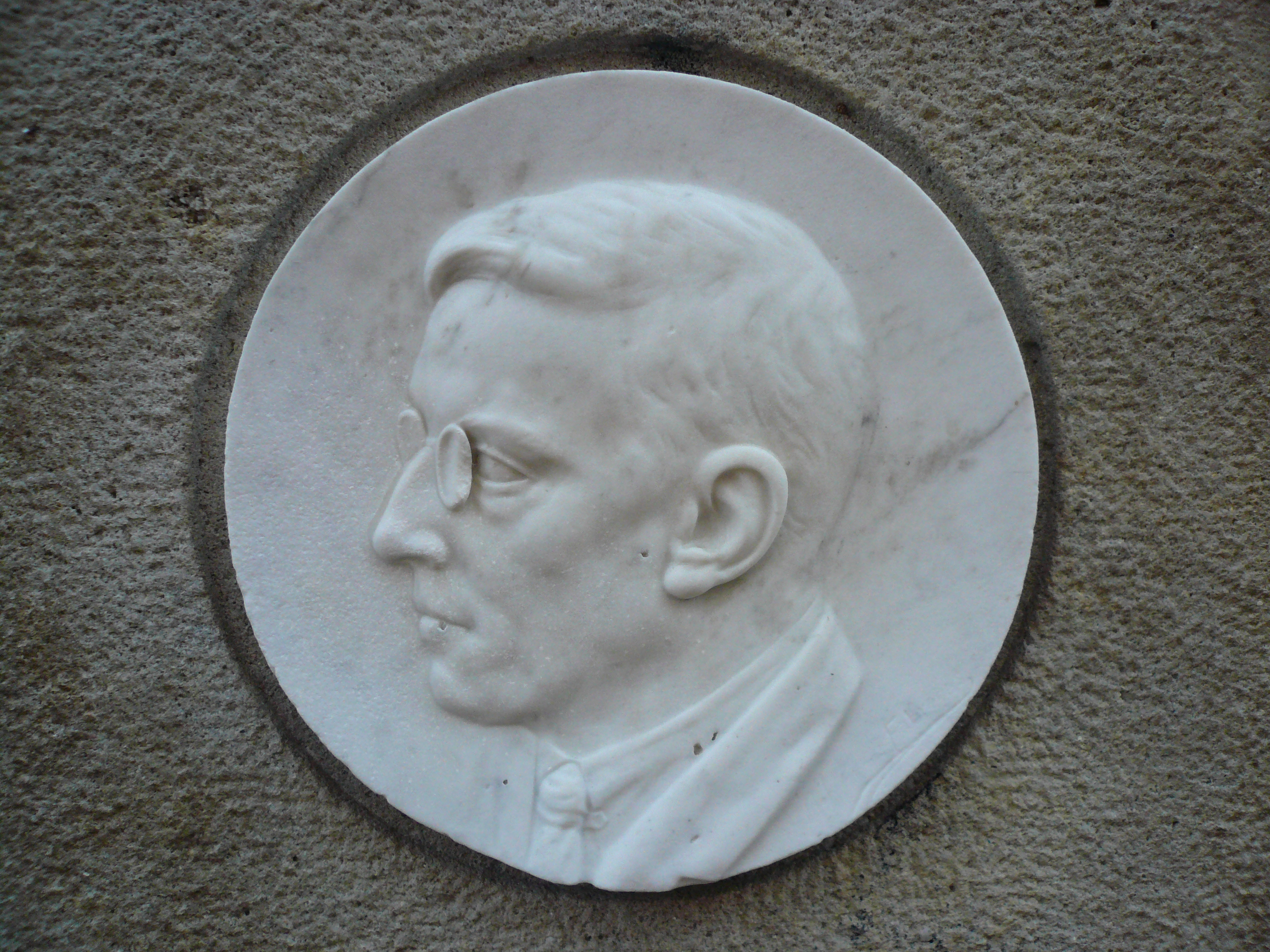
Image of Joan Junceda on a monument in Barcelona

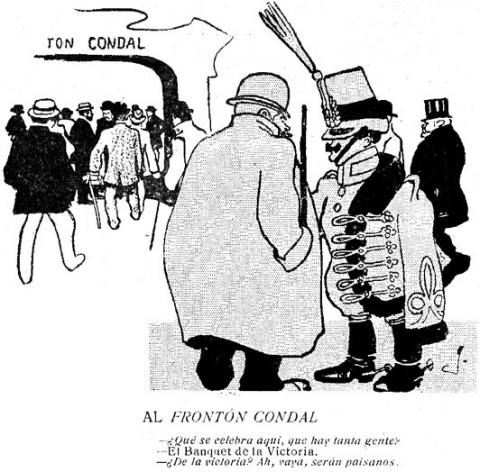
Cartoon by Joan Junceda ridiculing the Spanish Army that led to the attack on the Cu-Cut! head office by the military

Joan Junceda, full name Joan García Junceda i Supervia (13 February 1881 in Barcelona – 10 September 1948 in Blanes, Selva), was one of the most important Catalan artists and illustrators in the first half of the 20th century. His father was from Asturian origin. Junceda worked in many publications, including ¡Cu-Cut!, Papitu, Picarol and En Patufet.

== Biography ==
After not being able to pass the tests in order to join the Spanish Army, Joan Junceda taught himself drawing while working at the offices of the El Siglo shopping center in Barcelona. There he became part of the team that was illustrating the shop's catalogues.

He published his first drawing in ¡Cu-Cut! on Christmas Eve 1902 under the pseudonym Ribera. Junceda illustrated the "Historietes Exemplars" series, a collection of stories with a moral lesson compiled by Josep Maria Folch i Torres, which were published for the first time in "L'Esquitx" magazine. His most well-known work, however, would be the illustrations he did for "Bon Seny", a compilation of the oral lore regarding seny, an archetypal Catalan virtue, that was undertaken by writer Josep Abril i Virgili (1869-1918) encouraged by Josep Torras i Bages, bishop of Vic. Bon Seny contains aphorisms, fables and humorous stories based on the rural traditions of Catalonia. It was published in the Catalan language before the Spanish Civil War and the book became rare during General Franco's era, when so much Catalan printed material had been burned and printing in Catalan was severely restricted. After the war Junceda worked making deluxe drawings, even illustrating the francoist book "Santa Tierra de España" (1942), de José Muntada Bach.

In 2003, the Professional Association of Catalan Illustrators (Associació Professional d'Il·lustradors de Catalunya) introduced the Premis Junceda (Junceda Prices), named after this artist in acknowledgment of his work as a renovator of contemporary illustration. A monument in honor of Joan Junceda made by Alfons Pérez i Fàbregas stands now in the Rambla de Catalunya, Barcelona.

== See also ==
- Seny
- Spanish Republican Army
