= ¡Cu-Cut! incident =

Assault conducted by Spanish officers

Coordinates: 41.3825°N 2.1769°E

The ¡Cu-Cut! incident, also known as La Cuartelada, was an assault conducted by Spanish officers on the Catalan satirical magazine ¡Cu-Cut! offices in Barcelona on 25 November 1905 in response to the publication of a satirical cartoon mocking the Spanish military.

== Background ==
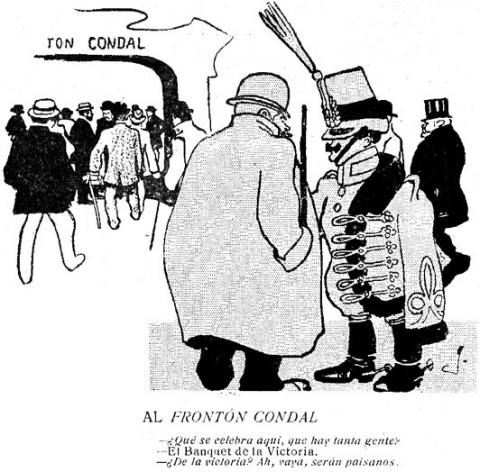
The cartoon found in issue No. 204

Spanish military personnel had been a common target of ¡Cu-Cut!'s editors because the Spanish Army had become an outdated and defective institution. Moreover, a sentiment prevailed in Barcelona that viewed the Spanish Army as the arm of a centralist and repressive government. General Valeriano Weyler and the role of the Spanish Army in the painful defeat in Cuba were recurrent topics of the magazine.

The 12 November 1905 municipal elections in Barcelona were a success for the Lliga Regionalista, a Catalanist political party to which ¡Cu-Cut! was affiliated. Six days later, the Lliga organized a celebratory dinner at the Frontón Condal building. That was not liked by rival Lerrouxist Republicans. At the conclusion of the dinner, a fight ensued between two groups of people of the opposing political parties that resulted in a few injured.

¡Cu-Cut! Issue No. 204, set to be published on 23 November 1905, depicted a satirical cartoon drawn by Joan Junceda captioned with a joke that referenced the confrontation between Catalanists and Lerrouxists and ridiculed the recent military defeats of the Spanish Army. The cartoon, "At the Frontón Condal", depicted two men conversing. One man says, "what is being celebrated here, with so many people?" The other replies, "the Banquet of Victory". The man asking the question then says, "of victory? Oh well, they must be civilians".

According to La Vanguardia, at 9:30 (WET) on 25 November, around 300 officers of the Barcelona garrison gathered in Royal Square, headed towards the ¡Cu-Cut! offices, destroyed them and set them on fire. That was at the Bagunyà press and library on Avinyó Street, where the children's magazine En Patufet and the newspaper La Veu de Catalunya were also edited.

== Reactions ==
Following the assault, the government suspended the magazine's publication. The next issue, No. 205, was not published until April 28, 1906. During this time, the ¡Cu-Cut! editor, Josep Baguñà, attempted to continue the publication of the magazine under a different name. Baguñà used Garba, an art and literature magazine edited by Joan Maragall, Víctor Català and Josep Pijoan to further ¡Cu-Cut! material. Garba issue No. 11 had a different format and included some sections with content nearly identical to ¡Cu-Cut!. That was noticed by Barcelona's governor, who immediately suspended the magazine.

Although the assault led to the creation of Solidaritat Catalana, a political coalition in Catalonia, it ignited a feeling of solidarity with the attackers in the rest of Spain. However, Premier Eugenio Montero Ríos's government decided to punish the attackers in the face of the crisis. King Alfonso XIII's opposition to that measure led to Ríos's resignation. He was succeeded by Segismundo Moret, who suspended the constitutional guarantees in Barcelona and, along with the minister Álvaro de Figueroa y Torres, implemented the Law of Jurisdictions, which favoured the military.

== Catalanism and Spanish military ==
Relations between the Spanish military and Catalanism were profoundly negative. In May 1905, the pro-Catalan independence journal La Tralla published a special issue commemorating the independence of Cuba for which the journal's director, Josep Maria Folch i Torres, along with three editors, were prosecuted.

Authors have claimed that the ¡Cu-Cut! incident marked the return of militarism in Spanish politics after a period of civilian rule. The assault on ¡Cu-Cut! certified the return of the military as a lobby group in the political sphere. In that case, it acted against what it considered to be a separatist threat that was being excessively tolerated by the government, according to many officers at the time.

== See also ==
- History of political Catalanism

== Bibliography ==
- Casassas i Ymbert, Jordi; Colomines, Agustí; Gonzalez Calleja, Eduard; Santolaria, Francesc (2005). Els fets del Cu-Cut!: taula rodona organitzada pel Centre d'Història Contemporània de Catalunya el 24 de novembre de 2005 (in Catalan). Generalitat de Catalunya, Centre d'Història Contemporània de Catalunya (published 2006). ISBN 978-84-393-7306-3.
- Santolaria Torres, Francesc (2005). El Banquet de la Victòria i els fets de ¡Cu-Cut! Cent anys de l'esclat catalanista de 1905. Meteora. ISBN 978-84-95623-38-6.
