= Josep Torras i Bages =

Catalan thinker, writer and bishop

Venerable Josep Torras i Bages
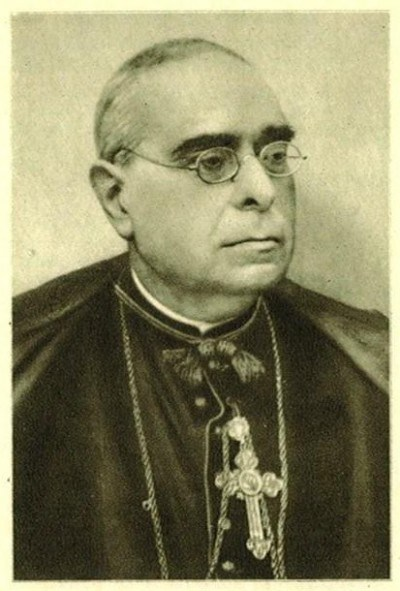
- Bishop Torras i Bages.
- Church: Catholic Church
- Province: Tarragona
- Diocese: Vic
- See: Vic
- Appointed: 10 December 1899
- Term ended: 7 February 1916
- Predecessor: Josep Morgades i Gili
- Successor: Francisco Muñoz Izquierdo

Orders
- Ordination: 23 December 1871
- Consecration: 10 December 1899 by Josep Morgades i Gili

Personal details
- Born: Josep Torras i Bages; 12 September 1846 Les Cabanyes, Catalonia, Spain
- Died: 7 February 1916 (aged 69) Vic, Catalonia, Spain
- Buried: St. Peter's Cathedral, Vic
- Denomination: Roman Catholic
- Occupation: Catholic bishop, apologetic writer.
- Profession: Catholic bishop
- Education: Seminary of Barcelona; Seminary of Vic
- Motto: Pro Christo legatione fungimur (English: Ambassador on behalf of Christ)
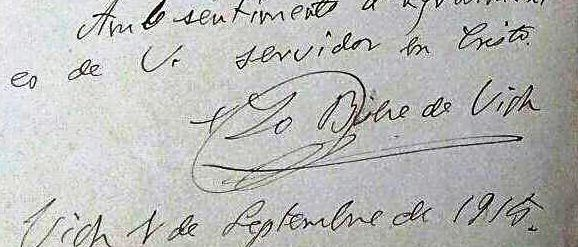
- Signature

Sainthood
- Venerated in: Roman Catholic Church (especially in the sees of Catalonia)
- Title as Saint: Venerable
- Shrines: Tomb (St. Peter's Cathedral, Vic)

Ordination history of Josep Torras i Bages
History
Priestly ordination
- Date: 23 September 1871
Episcopal consecration
- Date: 23 December 1899

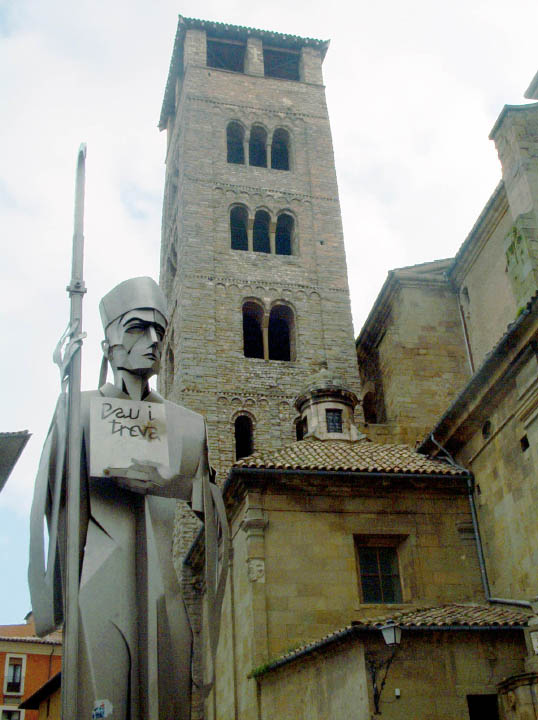
The cathedral in Vic, where Josep Torras lived the last part of his life.

Josep Torras i Bages (Catalan pronunciation: [ʒuˈzɛp ˈtorəz i ˈβaʒəs]), 12 September 1846 – 7 February 1916) was a Catalan thinker, writer, and bishop. He was one of the main figures in the turn of the 20th century Catholic Catalan nationalism.

== Biography ==
=== Torras and the Catalan traditions ===
Josep Torras strongly criticized the secularism displayed by the "militant nationalism" of Enric Prat de la Riba (1870–1917). In 1892 he wrote La tradició catalana, where he emphasized Conservative Nationalism and warned against the erosion of Christian values. Exalting rural life, the family, religion, and the love of Catalan language, the land and the language took an almost mystical dimension in his point of view. He was convinced that the Catalan nation had to be Christian in order to establish itself as something enduring and meaningful in the future. His words "Catalunya serà cristiana o no serà" (Catalonia will be Christian or will not be) are engraved at the gate of Santa Maria de Montserrat abbey.

Torras was very interested in the study of the seny, a virtue often considered a Catalan cultural symbol, and encouraged others, like Josep Abril i Virgili and Jaume Raventós, to do so. Based on good sense and wisdom, seny was perceived by Torras to originate in the traditional Catalan rural farm (casa pairal or masia). The life in the traditional non-urban setting with its frugality, hard work, and religious piety was the right ground for the development of the values and social norms embodied in the Catalan seny.

=== Ecclesiastical work ===
In 1882 Torras became counselor to bishop of Barcelona J. M. Urquinaona. Specializing in conflict-solving among Catholics, he also was the censor of some newspapers that were compromised in certain inner troubles (procesos canónicos) of the Spanish Church at the time.

Years later, in 1888, Torras, after analyzing the growing secularization of Spanish society, wrote the book El clero en la vida social moderna in Spanish. In his work he wrote straightforwardly about the often integrist or reactionary position of the Catholic Church in Spain, and sought to encourage the Spanish Catholic clergy to adapt to the spirit of the times and to focus on moderation and personal spiritual discipline, advice that went largely unheeded at the time.

Torras was promoted to become archbishop of Burgos in 1906 and Valencia in 1913, but he declined because he did not want to put a distance between himself and the mission he was committed to in the heart of Catalonia.

=== Death and beatification process ===
Torras i Bages died in Vic in 1916.

His cause was formally opened on 21 April 1936, granting him the title of Servant of God. Due to political issues, it progressed slowly until 1992, when his heroic virtues where recognised by Pope John Paul II thus officially becoming a venerable. As of now, only a miracle is needed to conclude the beatification process.

== Works ==
Most of his works have been published in compilations under the title Obres completes, his abundant correspondence, crucial for the understanding of certain issues surrounding Catalan nationalism, was finally published in 1998.

As of 2020, the most recent edition of his works, that of Abadia de Montserrat, as well as his correspondence, are available online at archive.org (see § External links).

== See also ==
- Seny
- Catalan nationalism
- Catalan symbols
- Cercle Artístic de Sant Lluc
- Roman Catholic Diocese of Vic
