= Catalan Solidarity (1906) =

Catalan Solidarity Solidaritat Catalana
- Leader: Nicolás Salmerón; Enric Prat de la Riba
- Founded: 1906
- Dissolved: 1909
- Succeeded by: Republican Nationalist Federal Union
- Ideology: Regionalism; Catalan nationalism Federalism
- Political position: Big tent

Catalan Solidarity (Catalan: Solidaritat Catalana, SC) was a coalition of political parties in Catalonia formed after the 1905 ¡Cu-Cut! incident and the approval of the 1906 Law of Jurisdictions. It was joined by the Republican Union of Nicolás Salmerón, leading to an internal rift within the party that would see Alejandro Lerroux's founding of the Radical Republican Party (PRR) in 1908.

== Bibliography ==
- Serrano Lahoz, Manuel (2020). Los partidos republicanos durante la Restauración (1874-1931) (PDF) (BA thesis) (in Spanish). University of Zaragoza.
