= Francesc Cambó =

Spanish politician

Francesc Cambó i Batlle
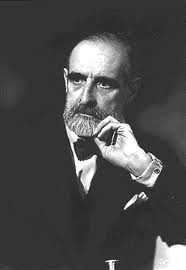
- Born: 2 September 1876; Verges, Spain
- Died: 30 April 1947 (aged 70); Buenos Aires, Argentina
- Occupation: politician

Francesc Cambó i Batlle (Catalan pronunciation: [fɾənˈsɛsk kəmˈbo]; 2 September 1876 – 30 April 1947) was a conservative Spanish politician from Catalonia, founder and leader of the autonomist party Lliga Regionalista. He was a minister in several Spanish governments. He supported a number of artistic and cultural endeavours, especially, the translation of Greek and Latin classical texts to Catalan.

== Biography ==
Francesc (Francisco de Asís) Cambó y Batlle, as his full name was, was born in Verges in the comarca of Baix Empordà, Catalonia, Spain. on September 2, 1876.

=== Bismarck or Bolívar ===
He was the most influential figure of the so-called “regenerationist catalanism” in the first third of the 20th century Spain. Since his youth he was active in regionalist organizations, some of which he had co-founded. In 1901 he founded a new political party, the Lliga Regionalista de Catalunya, being elected that same year as municipal councilor in the city of Barcelona. At that time, a speech pronounced before King Alfonso XIII in official visit in Barcelona, in which Cambó defended the need of a solution to the "Catalan problem" but "in Spain" and, of course, within the monarchy" unleashed the wrath of his party rivals, (as well described in the movie "The burned city"). As the Catalan political movement split in 1904 Cambó, who promoted a more conservative and possibilist approach to the issue of identity and regional political power, along with Enric Prat de la Riba, became the undisputed leader of the conservative branch of the Catalan movement. In 1906, and supported by almost all Catalan political and social sectors, Cambó drove the movement "Solidaritat Catalana" or Catalan Solidarity, in response to a most controversial “law of jurisdictions” approved by the central Government. As electoral platform, that movement took hold dramatically and obtained 41 deputies in the Cortes (Spanish Parliament) in the elections of 1907. With this political potential, Cambó tried to impose his theses defending the conservative project, in harmony with Spanish politics. Strongly criticized by the more nationalistic and radical sectors - he had survived a shooting by a gunman during the 1907 election campaign-, the project ended up failing at the ballot box in 1908. Still, from his seat in Parliament, Cambó continued advocating both for Catalan interventionism in the policy of the Government in Madrid, and for a strong autonomy in his Region. This combination of political positions led him to being sometimes considered as a disguised independentist in Madrid, and as a traitor in Barcelona. “You cannot be at the same time Catalonia’s Simon Bolívar and Spain’s Bismarck”, he was famously told once during a parliamentary debate by Nicelo Alcalá Zamora on December 10, 1918. Cambó was appointed Spanish Minister twice by the King, in the context of larger political agreements that reserved a seat to Catalan representatives in the Council of Ministers. In 1918 he was appointed Minister of Development and Public Investment (Ministerio de Fomento); in 1921 he was appointed Minister of Finance.

The Coup d’État of General Primo de Rivera made him depart from active politics, and focus in business and the publication of several works, mostly of political reflection: his vision of the Middle East; considerations about Italian Fascism; and more generally, about dictatorships. In 1930 he wrote "Per la Concòrdia" (“In favor of Harmony”), which sought to reconcile the monarchy and autonomy of Catalonia. In a last political effort in the already tense Catalan and Spanish political environment that would lead to the fall of the Spanish Monarchy, Cambó founded in March 1931 a new party, the “Constitutional Center”, hoping in vain that he could stem the Republican tide. After the proclamation of the Second Spanish Republic in 1932, Cambó moved to France returning shortly afterwards. In February 1933 he changed the name of his older party, now renamed as Liga Catalana or Catalan League, and in that year November's elections he was elected to Parliament for the last time.

=== The Civil War and final years ===
When General Francisco Franco and his Nationalist forces revolted against the Republic in July 1936, Cambó was outside the country. Cambó provided financial support to the “Nationals” during the Civil War that followed the "Alzamiento" or uprising. Cambó would write later in his Memoirs: “having to choose between idiots and criminals, I chose the idiots”. In his view, the success of the Republicans in the war would have put the whole of Spain under the control of Moscow and Communism. Francesc Cambó never returned to live in Spain after the Civil War, which he passed in exile with his family in Paris and Montreux (Switzerland). In 1942, after two years living in New York, he moved to Buenos Aires, where he died in 1947. He was survived by his daughter, Helena, born in 1929 from his relationship with Mercedes Mallol, whom he would marry several years later. In 1976, only months after the death of the Dictator, his corpse was returned among public acclamation to be buried at the Montjuïc Cemetery in Barcelona.

=== The collector and patron ===
While mostly known as a politician, Cambó had other relevant activities along his life. As a young lawyer, he once had Nijinsky, the dancer, as client, saving him from ending in jail at the request of his lover and impresario Diaghilev. In 1918 Cambó made an important fortune, as a result of several business operations related to the international distribution and supply of electricity. From that moment on, while using part of that money to live by very high standards, he became one of the most important art private collectors and cultural donors in the history of his country. During his life he promoted many social and cultural initiatives, on his own or supporting others, as for example the educational projects for women of Francesca Bonnemaison. Several of these projects were addressed to the consolidation of the Catalan language, such as the Collection Bernat Metge, a monumental translation into Catalan of all Greek classic writers, or the funding of the most important Catalan Dictionary by the most respected linguist Pompeu Fabra, or the financing of a new modern translation of the Bible into Catalan language. He bequeathed almost all his artworks to the public in state museums in Madrid, at the Prado Museum and in Barcelona (today, the Cambó Bequest can be visited at the MNAC).

== Full bibliography and documents ==
- The Cambó Institute
