= Llorenç Brunet =

Spanish cartoonist (1872-1939)

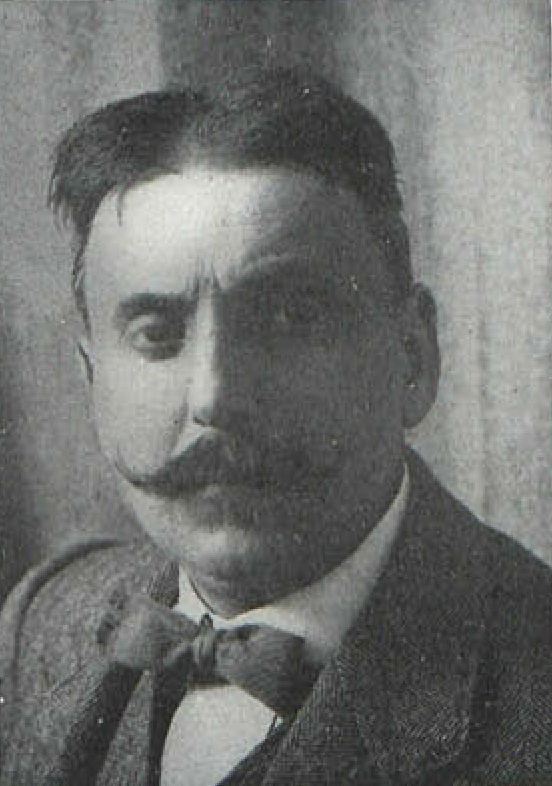
A picture of Brunet in 1910

Llorenç Brunet Forroll (1872-1939), also known in Spanish as Lorenzo Brunet, was a Spanish illustrator, caricaturist and watercolorist. He signed his works as L. Bru-Net or Bru-Net.

== Life ==
Brunet was born in Badalona on 14 September 1872, son of the primary teacher Josep Brunet i Bassachs, native from the same town, and Joana Forroll i Codina, from Tiana. During his childhood showed interest in drawing and painting and had contact with Antoni Caba, a prestigious painter and former director from Barcelona Arts and Crafts School who was also a friend of his father, to whom he promised to protect and help Llorenç study art.

Some years later he started his studies at Arts and Crafts School. His teachers were the artists Claudi Lorenzale, Eusebi Planas and the aforementioned Caba. Brunet also had great admiration for Claudi Castelucho. Brunet won awards at some contests, in 1891 his teacher Eusebi Planas recommended him going to Paris, where he learned with the lithographer Mercier. In France he started raising money because of the precarious situation of his parents, to whom he sent money periodically, however he had to abandon temporarily his studies. Short after this, he returned to studies and he stayed in Oran and Algiers for some time practising painting and drawing and also worked as an illustrator for important French and Spanish publishing houses. There he became interested of applied art of printing books and graphical work in general, field where he ended up standing out. When he was 20 and was staying in Algiers won an extraordinary award for composition and historical theme with the large oil painting named Entrega de las llaves de Orán al cardenal Cisneros, which was later ceded to Badalona City Council.

The next year he was sent to military service, to the body of engineers in Madrid where he likewise practised his artistic technique. From that period are drawings as La marcha del quinto and Mi capitán (1895). When he returned to Catalonia, he settled in Barcelona and married Consolació Salada, with whom had two daughters, Julieta and Maria Teresa. In 1910 the statal Junta de Pensiones para Ampliar Estudios, chaired by Santiago Ramon y Cajal, gave him a scholarship to study in Germany. He lived in Leipzig until some time before the start of World War I, where he get fond for bookplates. Since then Brunet felt great sympathy for the Germans, his friends and family considered him a Germanophile.

When he returned to Barcelona was appointed teacher of drawing and colour in the section of artistic craft of the local School of Work. The arrival of the Second Spanish Republic, the new authorities removed him in 1931, a fact that upset and demoralized him. Brunet has been considered an apolitical personal and his only interest was art. It is probable that his cessation was simply because he had been appointed during the monarchical period. He tried to fight what he belevied to be an injustice and asked help to his friend Apel·les Mestres to intercede for him. However, a few years later he was appointed professor at the Secondary School in Sant Feliu de Guíxols, a position he held for very little time and eventually resigned. The Spanish Civil War meant worries and concerns for him. His house located in Balmes street was registered several times. In spite of this he continued to go to social circles at the cafes in the Rambla. A short time after his daughter Maria Teresa got sick and Brunet himself, affected for this, became ill and had to be admitted at the hospital. On 28 September 1938 his daughter died and the next year Brunet died too, on 12 October 1939.

== Work ==
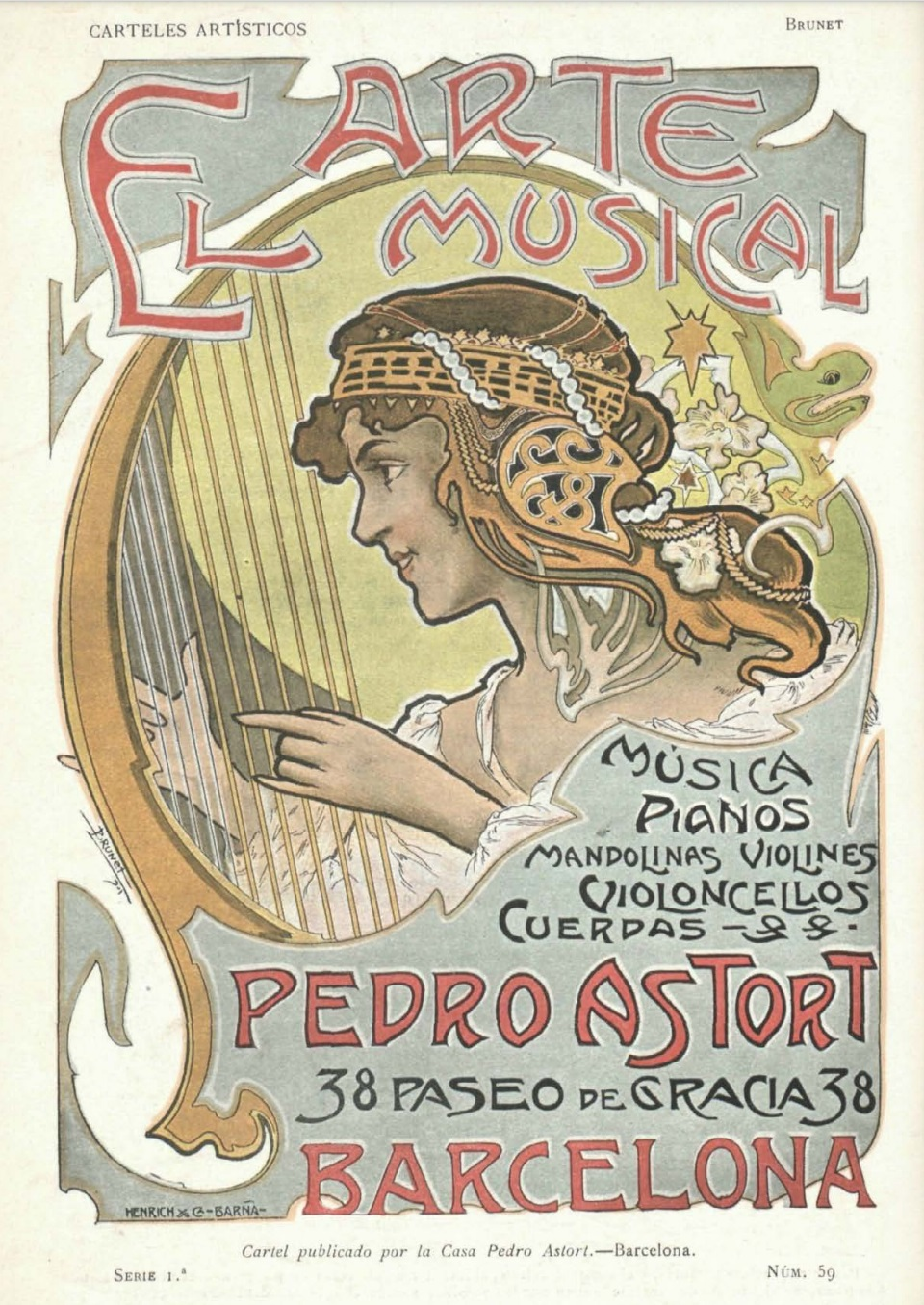
Poster made for Pedro Astort music instruments store in 1912.

Brunet was a very prolific artist, working especially on bookplates, drawings, caricatures and posters, as well as watercolors, with which he participated several times in exhibitions in Barcelona in years 1911, 1918, 1919 and 1921. His work was awarded in various exhibitions and competitions, both in Spain and internationally. These distinctions made him deserve to be a member of the Spanish committee of the Rivoli International Exhibition. Important publishers, magazines and art books asked for his works to illustrate his works. In Catalonia and Spain Brunet collaborated with newspapers as L'Esquella de la Torratxa, La Campana de Gràcia, La Campana Catalana, El Diluvio Ilustrado, Palla Nova, Cu-Cut!, Dominguín and ABC. He signed his works as L. Bru-Net or only Bru-Net.

He published two collections of pen drawings: Caps de casa (1922) and Testes de la terra-Catalunya (1929), a collection of types from various Catalan regions. Brunet was fond of drawing landscapes, as a good connoisseur of the mountains around Badalona, especially La Conreria, he made drawings of the views of the mountains and their monuments, such as the Carthusian monastery of Montalegre (Tiana). Some of his drawings were published in 1889 in the magazine La Ilustración Ibérica. It also illustrated the book about the monastery of Montalegre in 1921 written by Pedro Cano Barranco.

Art critic Núñez de Prado wrote about Brunet: “He is superb and human at a time. He possesses the humor of the English and the intention of the Germans. Sometimes wanting to scratch, tear, perhaps remembering what his father suffered and the little protection of the governments of those times, despite the already high personalities have admired him and begged him to send and acquire his excellent original drawings, as did his great admirers and protectors, Segismundo Moret, Nicolás Salmerón, the King of Saxony, the Prince of Wüttemberg, Santiago Ramón y Cajal, Dato, Bascarán, Maura and Bermúdez Reina.”

Since his death, his work soon was forgotten, despite his remarkable artistic quality. At the end of 2018, the Museum of Badalona dedicated an exhibition to him, giving special importance to his drawings of the World War I.

== Collectionism ==
For many years Brunet became interested and collected many artistic works and antiquities from Catalonia. Brunet gathered them in a house which he called Cau Brunet, located in Colònia Bosc de la Coreria, a summer residential area in Sant Fost de Campsentelles. His intention was to turn the house into a museum. The land on which he had built the house had probably been given to him by the promoters of the area, Francesc Artigues and Gonçal Arnús, who were interested in the founding of a museum in the colony and convert it in a meeting point for hikers. Brunet turned the house into that museum in 1914 and asked collaboration to Badalona City Council, that seconded the proposal. On October 16 of that year, the mayor Josep Casas wrote him thanking for his work.

== Bibliography ==
- C. G. P. (February 1970). "Entrega de las llaves de Orán al cardenal Cisneros". Amistad. Boletín del Museo Municipal. 12. Museum of Badalona: 3.
- Cuyàs i Tolosa, Josep Maria (1981). "En Llorenç Brunet". Carrer dels Arbres: Revista anuari del Museu de Badalona. 1 (18). Museum of Badalona: 21–22.
- Pérez Gómez, Xavier (2012). "El Cau Brunet 1916". Campsentelles. 15: 75–90.
