= Isidre =

Isidre (Catalan pronunciation: [iˈziðɾə]) is a Catalan male given name. Notable people with this name include:

- Isidre Bonsoms i Sicart (1849–1922), Catalan bibliophile and cervantist
- Isidre Codina, Spanish football manager
- Isidre Molas (born 1940), Catalan politician and historian
- Isidre Nonell (1872–1911), Spanish artist
- Isidre Puig Boada (1891–1987), Spanish Catalan architect
