= Cervantine Collection of the Biblioteca de Catalunya =

Cervantine Collection
Quantity	approximately 9,000 volumes
Origin	Donation of Isidre Bonsoms in 1915 and later intakes
Range	from 16th to 21st century
Total of languages	51
Access	Reading room of rare materials of the Library of Catalonia

The Cervantine collection of the Biblioteca de Catalunya is one of the most important collections in public sector about Miguel de Cervantes and his works.

Originally, it derives from a donation of around 3400 volumes of the bibliophile Isidre Bonsoms from Barcelona in 1915. It includes the works of Cervantes in original language and translations, works of biographic character and literary criticism as well as adapted and inspired works and Cervantine iconography.

== History ==
In 1914 Isidre Bonsoms i Sicart (1849–1922), a Catalan bibliophile and erudite, communicated to the responsibles of the Library of Catalonia, inspector Jaume Massó i Torrants and director Jordi Rubió i Balaguer, his plan to transfer the Cervantine collection that he had gathered in many years of laborious searches to the library. A large part of these collected books came originally from the collection of Leopold Rius (1840–1898) who is considered as the father of the modern Cervantine bibliography.

When the recently founded library received the collection of 3.367 volumes in 1915, the items were stored in the Blue Room of the Institut d'Estudis Catalans in the Palau de la Generalitat – at that time headquarters of the library. In 1936 they were moved from this site to the Sala Cervantina of the Biblioteca de Catalunya in the former building of the Hospital de la Santa Creu. In order to promote the accessibility of these precious books, the Institut d’Estudis Catalans hired Joan Givanel as the first keeper of the collection to start the project of a catalogue in 1915.

Due to further donations, acquisitions, exchange and the legal deposit the collection has been developed over the past years and is still continuing to grow. Thus, it currently counts around 9.000 volumes.

== Content and particular items ==
Despite the bibliographic value of the whole collection, one might also consider the high individual value of numerous pieces.

The collection contains the first editions of every Cervantine work in original language and translations except from La Galatea which is conserved in form of a very rare item of the second edition published in 1590 in Lisbon.

The following most valuable items of the famous work of Miguel de Cervantes, Don Quijote, form part of the collection:

- One of the items of the six editions of the first part that were printed in 1605. According to Censo de ejemplares elaborated by a group of the Investigación Prinqeps 1605, led by Victor Infentes, there are 28 items of the first edition existent, of which one of them is conserved at the Biblioteca de Catalunya.
- Items of all 65 editions realized during the Spanish Golden Age.
- One item of the first joint edition of both parts first published in Barcelona in 1617.
- One item of the English edition of Edward Blount [1617], containing one of the first published graphic representations of Quijote and Sancho.
- items of the first editions of translations in English (1612), French (1614), Italian(1622), German (1648), Dutch (1657) and other languages. At the moment, the collection contains translations in 51 languages of the Quijote.
- editions illustrated by famous artists like Charles-Antoine Coypel, Josep Lluís Pellicer, Luis de Madrazo, Eusebi Planas, Apel·les Mestres, Gustave Doré, José Moreno Carbonero, Salvador Dalí, Antonio Saura or Josep Segrelles.
- One of the five copies of the edition printed on parchment by Gabriel de Sancha and annotated by Juan Antonio Pellicer.

Amongst the graphic works are particularly valuable the collection of 16 watercolour paintings of which 15 served as illustrations for the edition of Don Quijote of the Real Academia Española of 1780. Furthermore, there are drawings of for example Antonio Carnicero, José del Castillo and José Brunete and original works of artist like Jaume Juez i Castellà or Eberhard Schlotter.

Besides the original works of Cervantes, biographies, studies and critics of the Cervantine opus are collected, too. Ephimera, from picture and playing cards to posters of cinematic adaptions (like for example Dulcinea), as well as some objects, offer – together with the illustrated editions and original graphic works, a broad range of the Cervantine iconography. Furthermore, the collection includes some musical scores like the symphonic poem of Don Quijote by Richard Strauss as well as auditory and audio-visual recordings, for example of the opera D.Q.

Finally, the oil portrait of Isidre Bonsoms, by the painter José María Vidal-Quadras and the bronze bust of Cervantes by the sculptor Josep Reynés, preside in the Sala Cervantina of the Biblioteca de Catalunya.

The Memória Digital de Catalunya dedicated an entry to the Cervatine Collection that is going to be increased with the most excellent works of public dominion.

== Bibliography ==
- Censo de ejemplares de la primera edición de El ingenioso hidalgo Don Quijote de La Mancha (Madrid, Juan de la Cuesta, 1605): IV. [Vigo]: Academia del Hispanismo, 2013
- Cincuenta años de la antigua Biblioteca de Catalunya. Barcelona: Biblioteca Central de la Diputación de Barcelona, DL 1968.
- La correspondencia entre Isidre Bonsoms Sicart y Archer Milton Huntington: el coleccionismo de libros antiguos y objetos de arte. Barcelona: Reial Acadèmia de Bones Lletres; Associació de Bibliófils de Barcelona, 2010.
- Escobedo, J. “La Sala Cervantina de la Biblioteca de Catalunya” an El blog de la BC, 20 març 2012. [online].
- Miguel de Cervantes: de la vida al mito: (1616-2016). Madrid: Biblioteca Nacional de España; Sociedad Estatal de Acción Cultural, 2016.
- Navarro, M.; Sanllehy, M. A. “La Secció de Reserva Impresa i Col•leccions Especials: 100 anys” an El blog de la BC, 27 September 2017. [online].
- El Quixot: un heroi de paper, els papers d’un heroi. Barcelona: Biblioteca de Catalunya, 2005.
