= L'Esquella de la Torratxa =

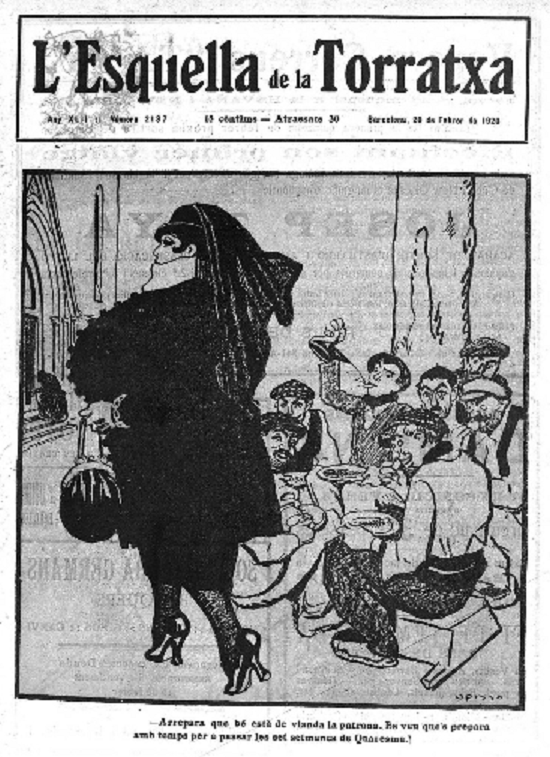
- 1920 cover with a drawing by Opisso
- Frequency: Weekly
- Founded: 1872
- Final issue: 1939
- Country: Spain
- Based in: Barcelona
- Language: Catalan

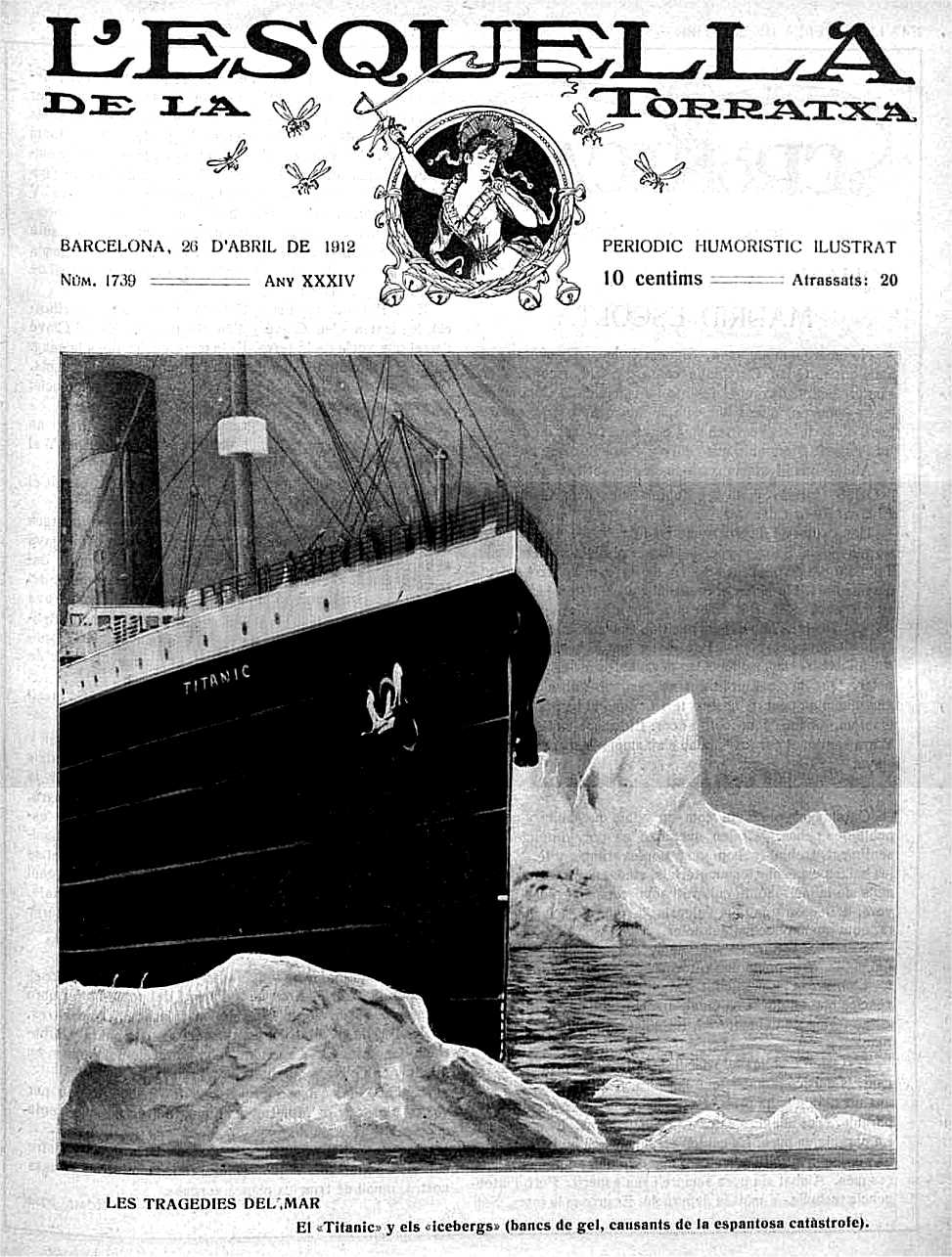
April 1912 issue with the Titanic on the cover

L'Esquella de la Torratxa was an illustrated satirical weekly magazine, written in Catalan. Published in Barcelona between 1872 and 1939, it was well known for its pro-republican and anti-clerical stance and would become one of the most important Catalan publications of all times.

== History ==
L'Esquella de la Torratxa, meaning "the cowbell of the turret", was first published on 5 May 1872. It began during an officially-decreed suspension of the publication of La Campana de Gràcia, a more overtly political magazine. It would, however, become very critical of Barcelona mayor Francisco Ríos Taulet and his promotion of the 1888 Barcelona Universal Exposition which was seen by many as a wasteful extravagancy.

The magazine had a succession of directors along its existence, beginning with José Roca Roca, followed by others such as Mario Aguilar, Prudenci Bertrana and Pere Calders. Among the most notable article writers for the magazine were Santiago Rusiñol, under the pen name "Xarau", Prudenci Bertrana, Francesc Curet, Antoni Rovira Virgili, Gabriel Alomar and Màrius Aguilar.

The main illustrators for the magazine were Apeles Mestres, Tomás Padrón, José Luis Pellicer, Luis Bagaría, Manuel Moliné, José Segrelles, Lorenzo Brunet, José Costa «Picarol», Juan Junceda, Jaime Pajarito, Félix Elías («Apa»), Jaime Juez («Xirinius»), Román Bonet («Bon»), Antonio Roca, Ricardo Opisso, Rosa Riera and Isidro Nonel. In 1939, after José María Planas, the director of El Be Negre, was murdered by anarchists some of the illustrators working for that magazine began working for L'Esquella de la Torratxa.

L'Esquella de la Torratxa came out for the last time on 6 January 1939, when General Franco's nationalist faction was poised to conquer Barcelona. During the civil war its competitor was La Ametralladora which was published by the nationalists. Since 1872 it had published a total of 3,096 issues.

== See also ==
- La Campana de Gràcia
- Ricard Opisso
- Santiago Rusiñol
