= Josefa Texidor Torres =

Spanish artist (1865–1914)

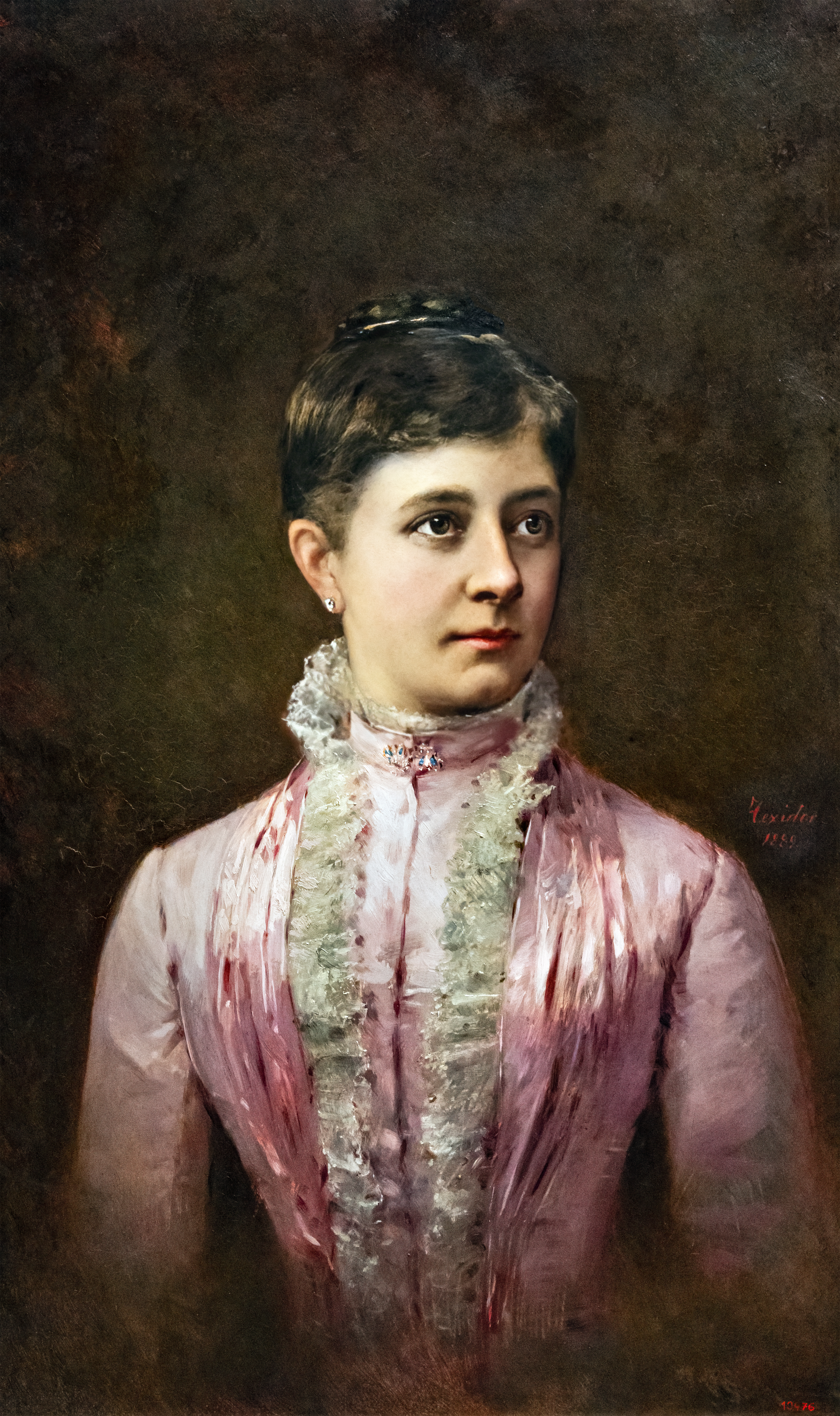
- Portrait of Pepita Teixidor by Modest Teixidor
- Born: 17 November 1865; Barcelona, Spain
- Died: 8 February 1914 (aged 48); Barcelona, Spain
- Known for: Painting

Josefa Texidor i Torres (also known as Pepita Texidor and Teixidor; 17 November 1865 – 8 February 1914) was a Spanish painter.

== Biography ==
Born in Barcelona in 1865, Torres was trained by her father, José Texidor Busquets, her brother, Modest Texidor Torres and later she studied under Francesc Miralles. Her brother wanted her to dedicate herself to the painting of portraits, but Pepita preferred, from the beginning, the use of watercolours and the painting of cultivated flowers. Pepita was trained in music, singing and painting and often travelled. She remained single and dedicated herself to family and charity work. She participated in many exhibitions in Barcelona and at the Exposition Universelle (Paris, 1900), where she was awarded a silver medal for her flower sprays in Springtime and Autumn. She was nominated an honorary member of the "Union des femmes peintres et sculpteurs". She died at the age of 49 in Barcelona in 1914, after a year of severe illness.

On 21 May 1914, there were meetings to commission a bust for the Parc de la Ciutadella. A tombola was held to raise funds through the sale of paintings by her father and brother, along with works from painters of the time, like Lluïsa Vidal, Isabel Baquero, Rafaela Sánchez Aroca, Visitació Ubach, Ramon Casas, Claudi Lorenzale, Santiago Rusiñol, Modest Urgell, Apel·les Mestres, etc.; and works also of dead artists, like Fortuny, Martí Alsina, Vayreda, etc. Apel·les Mestres dedicated a poem to her that he shared with all those who attended the inaugural act. The bust was designed by Manuel Fuxá and was inaugurated on 14 October 1917. (translated source)

In March 1909, La Vanguardia, reviewed a musical composition by Pepita Texidor – "Lola", a graceful habanera for the piano. She was praised for her 'refined talent' with both colours and sounds. The piece was edited by Musical Emporium and the cover was designed by Alexandre de Riquer with a female figure in dance pose. (translated source)

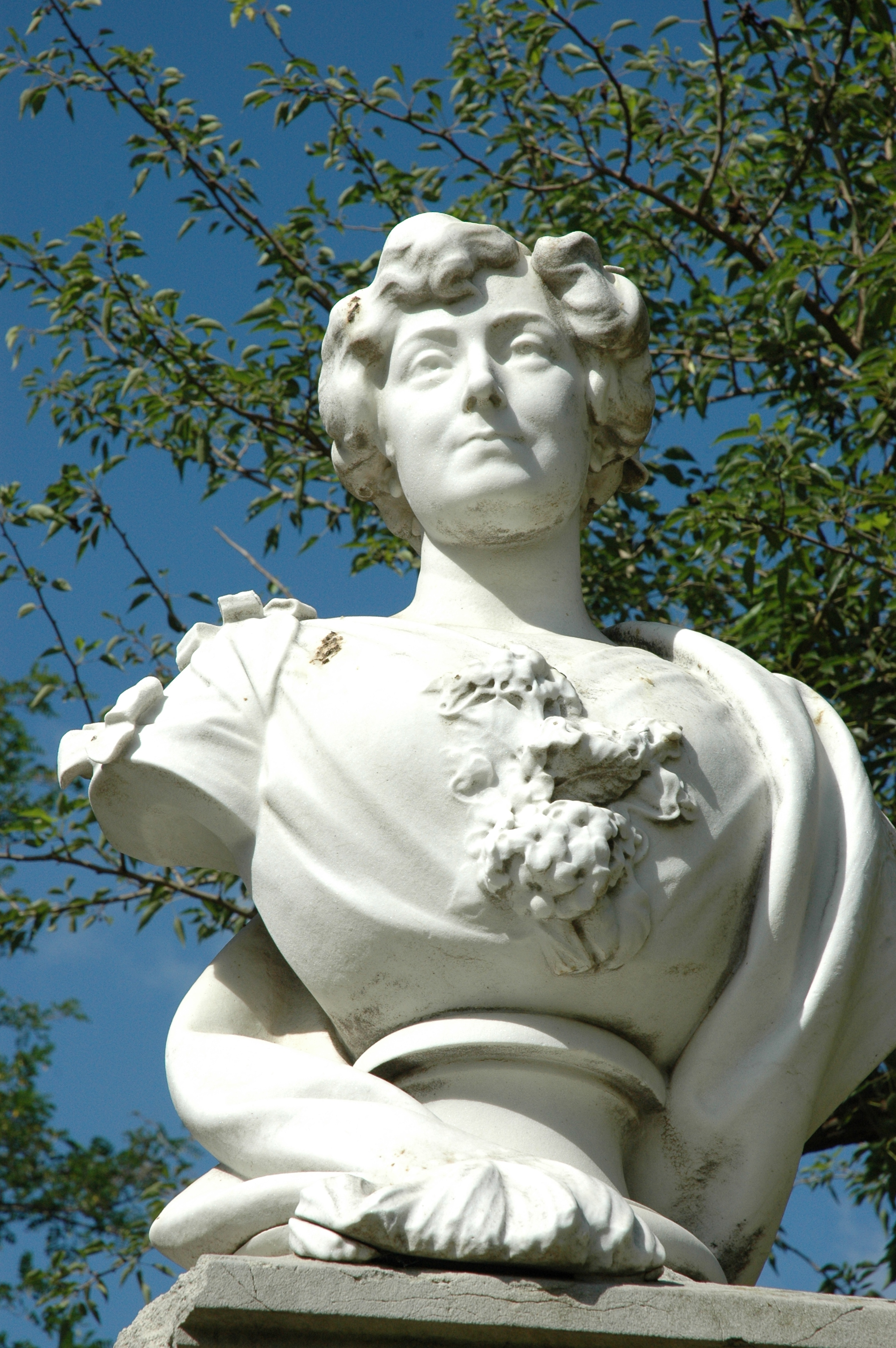
Statue of Pepita Texidor in the Parc de la Ciutadella, work of Manuel Fuxà (1917)
