= Isidre Nonell =

Spanish painter

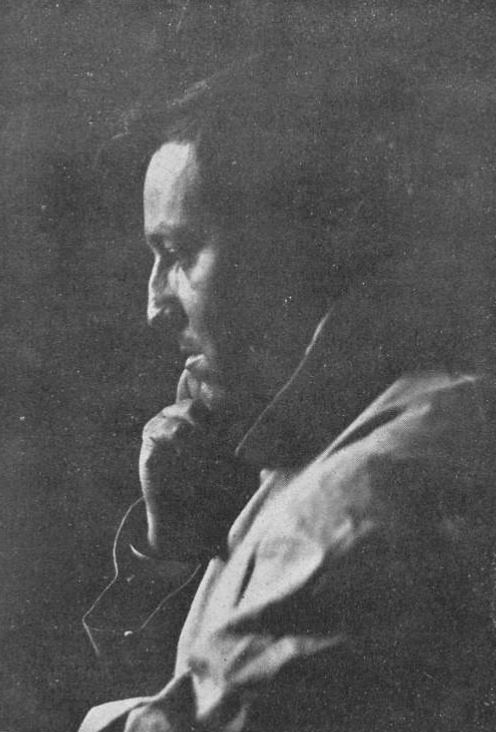
- Isidre Nonell, 1911
- Born: 30 November 1872; Barcelona
- Died: 21 February 1911; Barcelona

Isidre Nonell i Monturiol (Note: Also quoted as «Isidro Nonell y Monturiol».) (30 November 1872 – 21 February 1911) was a Catalan artist from Spain known for his expressive portrayal of socially marginalized individuals in late 19th-century Barcelona. He is considered to belong to the post-Modernista generation, with an often post-impressionist brushstroke but a darker tone than many of his contemporaries.

== Life ==
Isidre Nonell with two women subjects, c. 1904

Isidre Nonell was born in 1872 in Barcelona. His parents, Isidre Nonell Torras and Àngela Monturiol Francàs, owned a small but prosperous factory which made soup noodles. Together with his childhood friend, Joaquim Mir, with whom he attended the same school in the neighborhood of Sant Pere in the old part of town in Barcelona, he developed artistic ambitions at an early age.

His early teachers included Josep Mirabent, Gabriel Martínez Altés and Lluís Graner. From 1893 to 1895 he studied at the Escola de Belles Arts de Barcelona (Fine Arts School of Barcelona). He met Ricard Canals, Ramón Pichot, Juli Vallmitjana, Adrià Gual, and Joaquim Sunyer, with whom he developed an interest in landscape painting, studying light. The study of sunlight and its effects on color were a main part of Impressionism, which was then active. They were called the "Saffron Group" for the warm tones they used, as well as the "Sant Martí Group" after the town they painted in.

In 1894, he began producing illustrations for La Vanguardia. He later drew for other periodicals, including L'Esquella de la Torratxa, Barcelona Cómica, Pèl & Ploma, and Forma. In 1896, Nonell went with Ricard Canals and Juli Vallmitjana to the spa town of Caldes de Boí in the Spanish Pyrenees to work at the spa run by Vallmitjana's family. There, he saw a large number of people suffering from the illness of cretinism, which became a subject of his paintings.

In February 1897, he went to Paris with Ricard Canals. He returned to Barcelona in 1900. At the beginning of 1901, he made paintings of working-class and Romani women, and still lifes. He exhibited in the Sala París in Barcelona twice, in 1902 and 1903.

He died on 21 February 1911, due to typhoid fever in Barcelona.

== His work ==
The oil paintings show the influence of impressionism and pointillism expressed in a new way. Thick strokes layered one after another do not quite mix colors in the eye, leaving a directness of emotion. His subjects, most often women, were the overlooked and marginalized—poor women (often with children), Romani people, wounded soldiers repatriated from the Cuban war, and people suffering from cretinism.

=== Gallery of Images ===
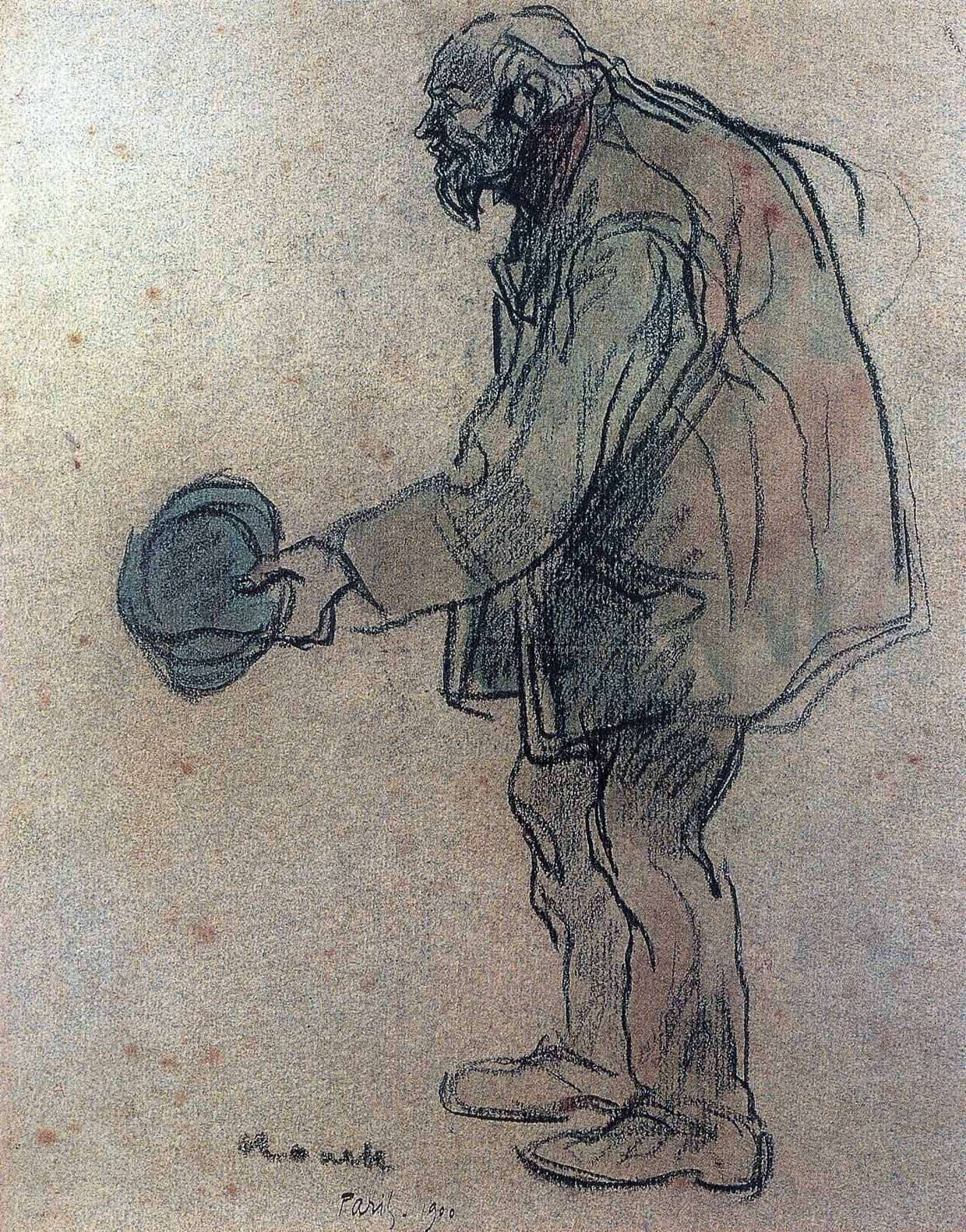
Drawing Captaire a París,1897

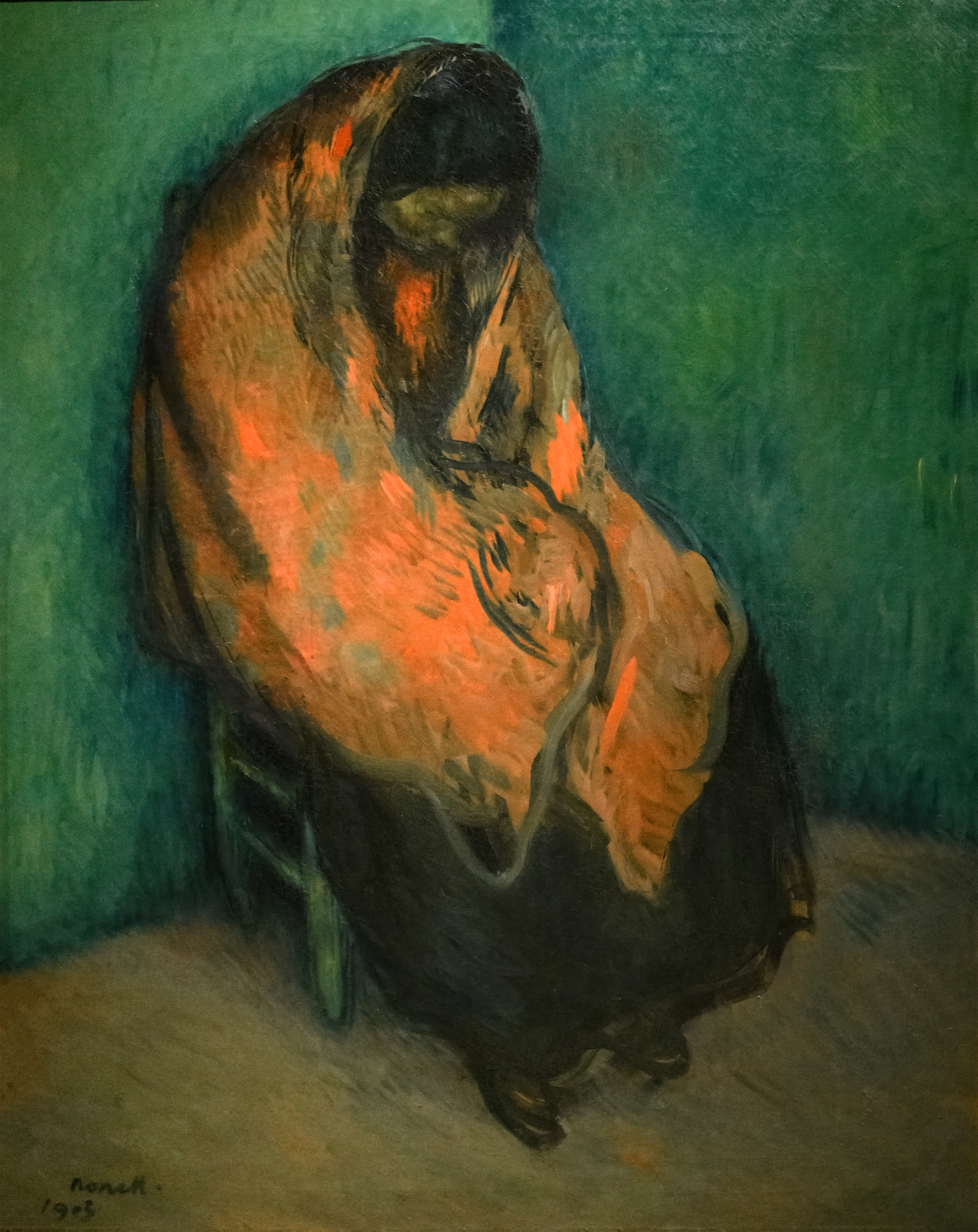
Painting Dolores, 1903

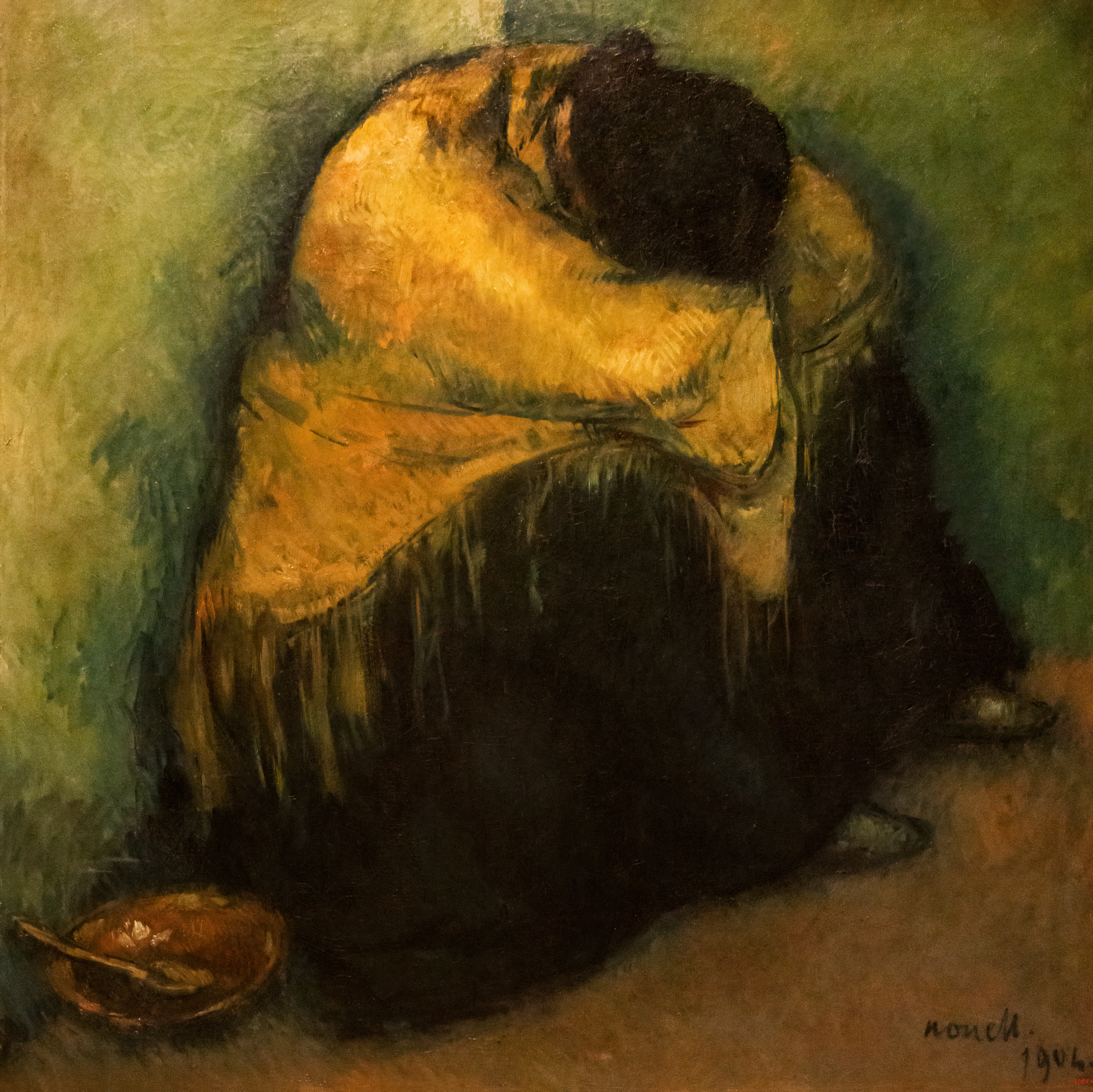
Repòs, 1904

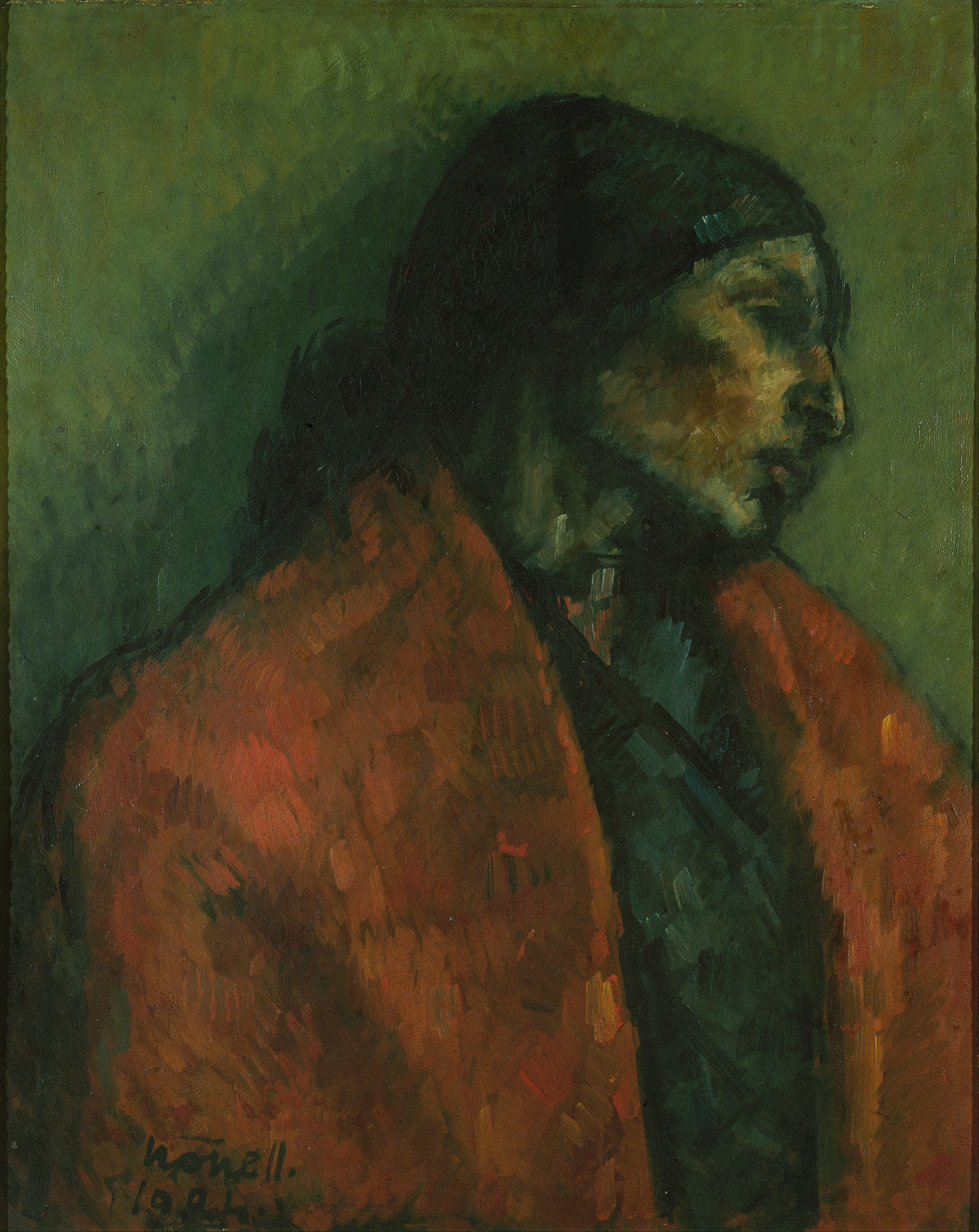
Painting , La Paloma, 1904

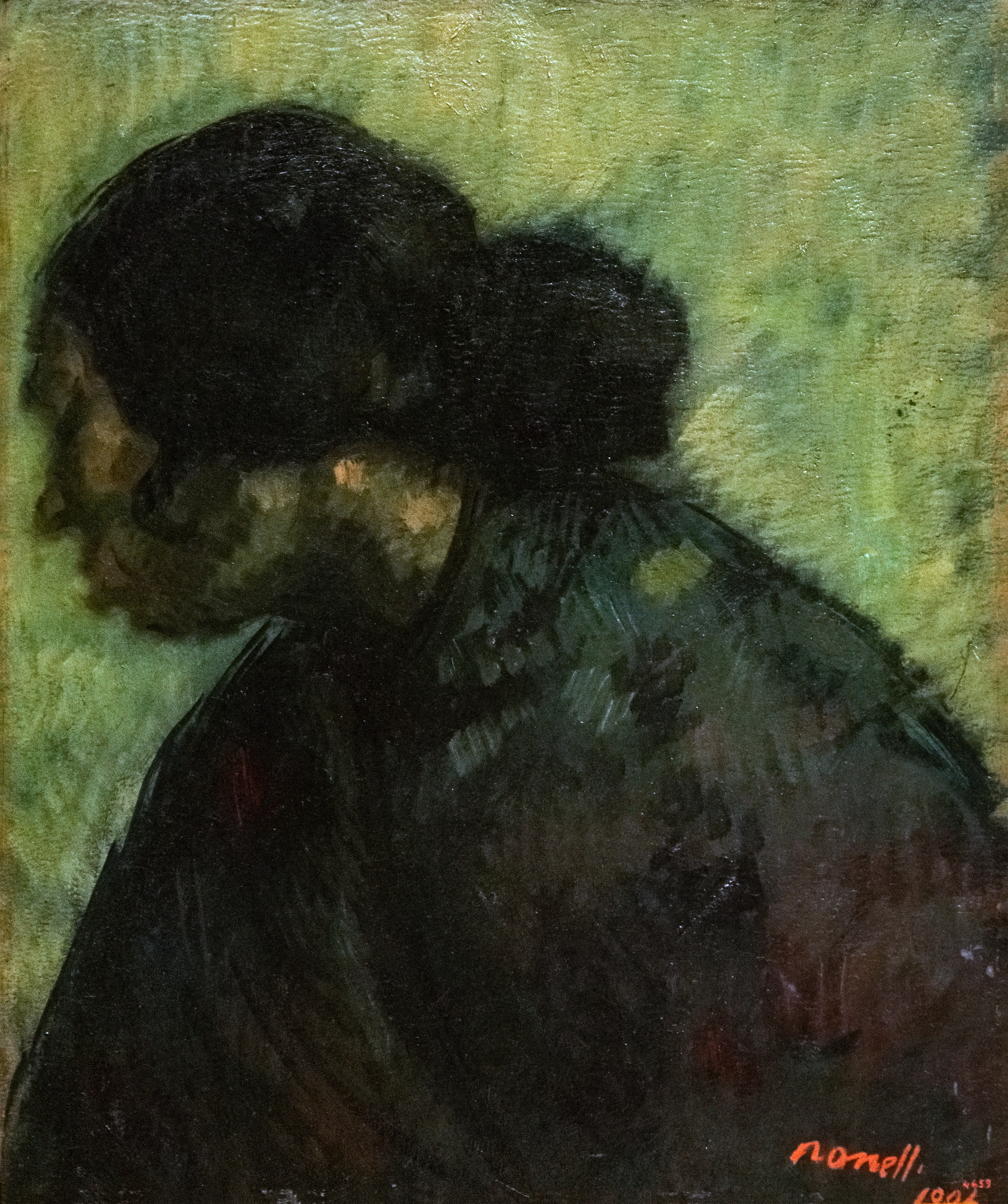
Cap de gitana, 1904

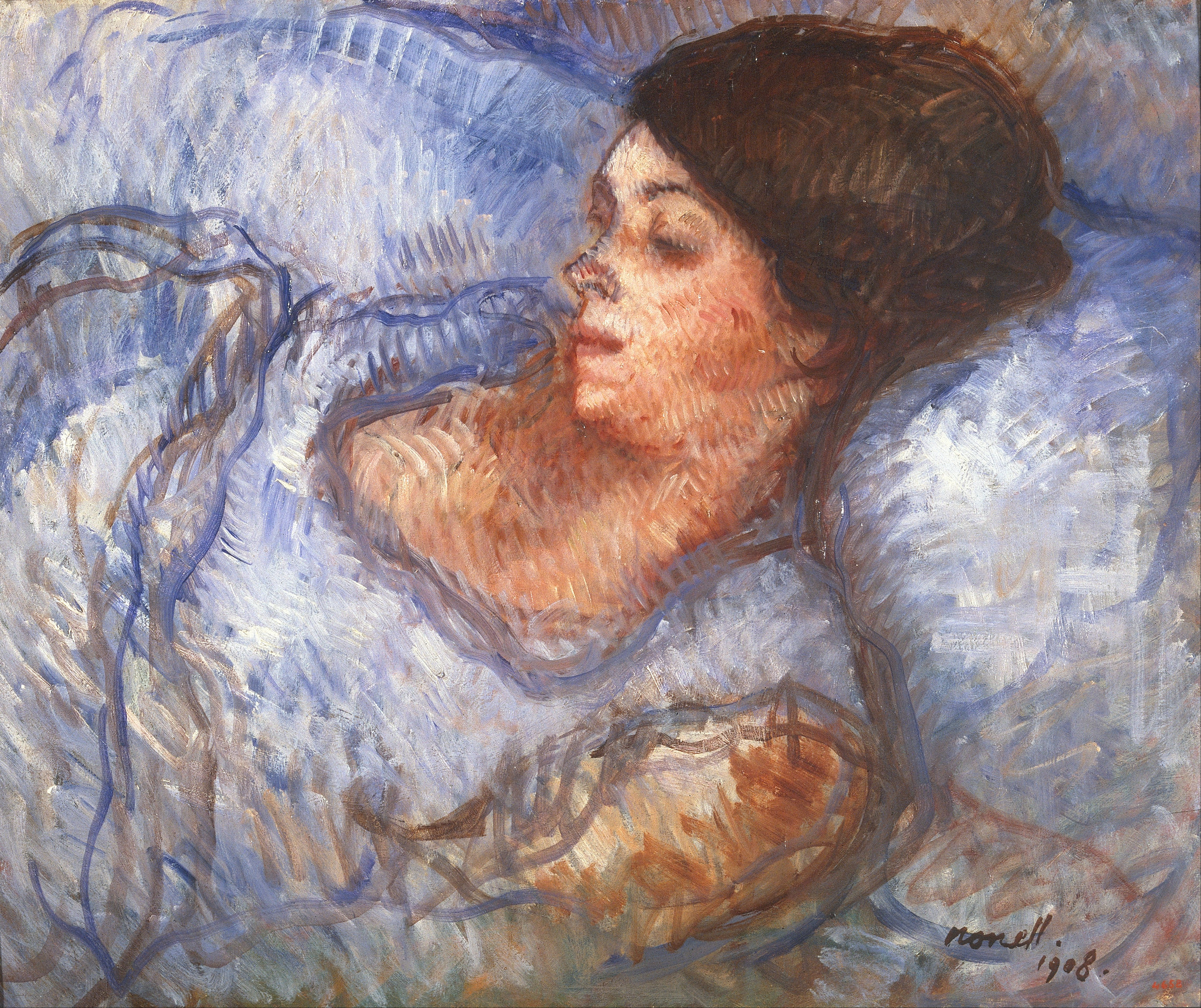
Painting Study, 1908

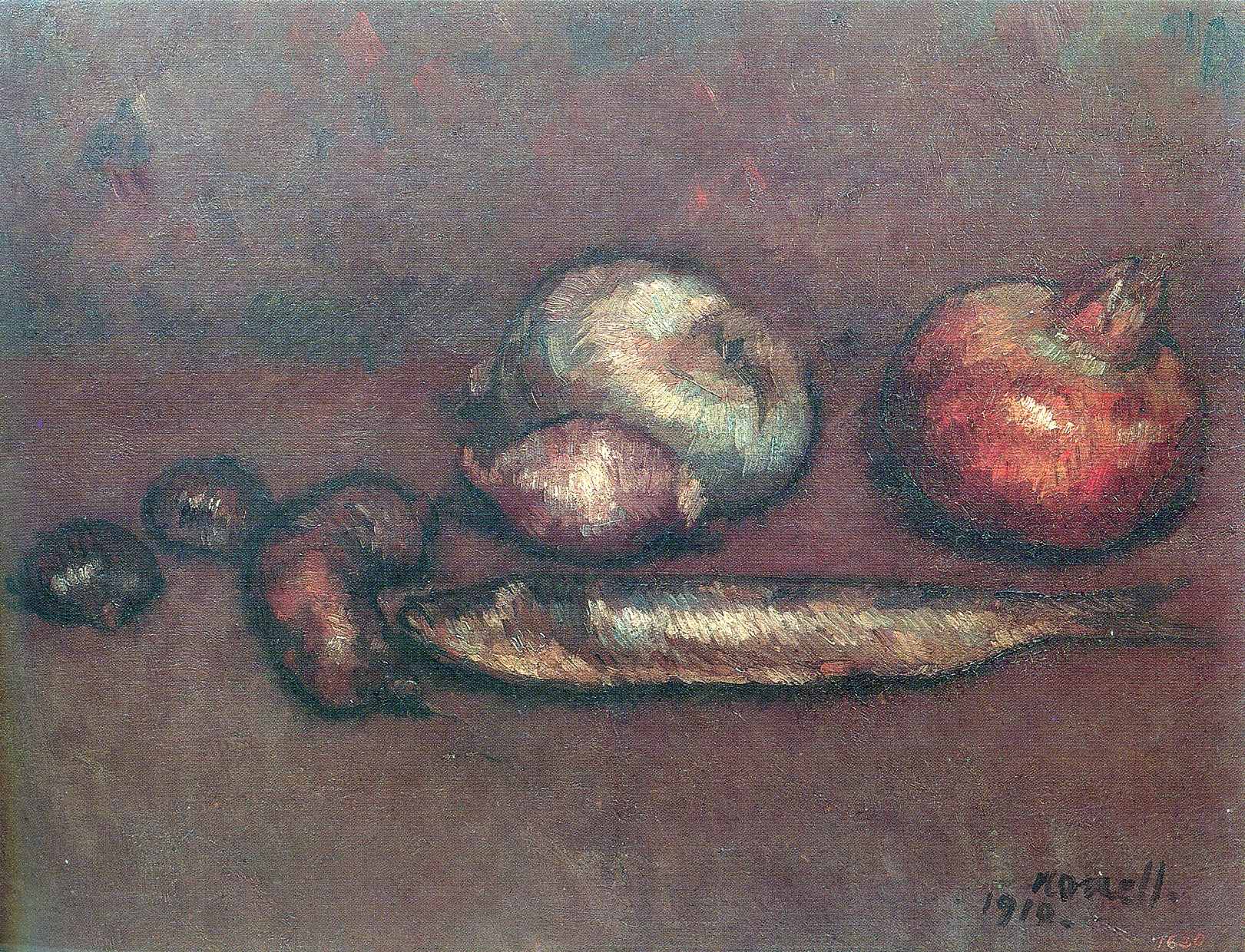
Painting Still-Life, 1910

=== Catalogues ===
In 2023, Edicions del Molí de Dalt published the title Nonell. Catàleg raonat de pintura authored by Glòria Escala.
In 2020, the Museu Nacional d'Art de Catalunya published the catalogue: Nonell: Visions from the Margins, authored by Francesc Quílez, Eduard Vallés and others (296 pp, ISBN 978-84-8043-363-1), following up on the likewise complete catalogue they had published in the year 2000: Isidre Nonell (1972-1911), with various authors: M. Doñate, F. Fontbona, C. Mendoza and C. Vidal (328 pp, ISBN 978-84-8043-066-1).

== Bibliography ==
- VV.AA.: Isidre Nonell (1872–1911), Editorial MNAC, Barcelona i Fundación Cultural Mapfre, Madrid 2000, ISBN 84-89455-37-6
- VV.AA.: Isidre Nonell, Editorial Polígrafa, Barcelona 1996, ISBN 84-343-0817-7
- Fontbona, Francesc, Nonell, Gent Nostra, Thor, Barcelona 1987.
- Jardí, Enric: Nonell, Editorial Polígrafa, Barcelona 1984, ISBN 84-343-0412-0
- Robinson, William H. et al, Barcelona and Modernity: Picasso, Gaudí, Miró, Dalí. Cleveland Museum of Art in association with Yale University Press, New Haven and London, 2006. ISBN 9780940717879
