= El Be Negre =

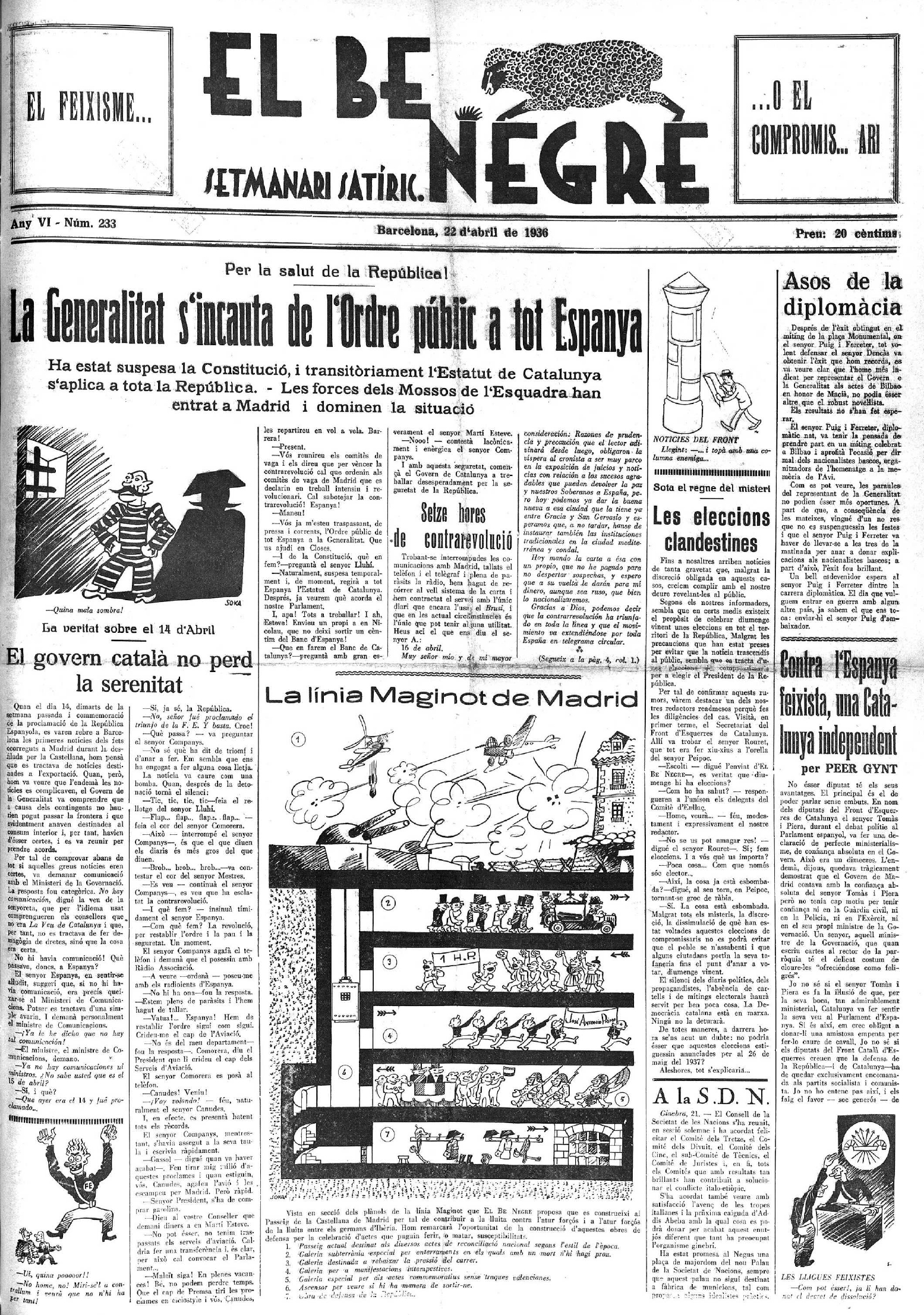
- Cover of El Be Negre April 1936 issue
- Categories: Satirical magazine
- Frequency: Weekly
- Founder: Amadeu Hurtado
- First issue: 1931
- Final issue: 1936
- Country: Catalonia (Spain)
- Based in: Barcelona
- Language: Catalan

El Be Negre, meaning "The Black Sheep" in Catalan, was an illustrated satirical weekly magazine. Published in Barcelona between 1931 and 1936, its life and destiny were closely linked to those of the ill-fated Second Spanish Republic.

Josep Maria Planes i Martí, director of the magazine, was assassinated by a group of anarchists in the turbulent times that swept over the city of Barcelona at the beginning of the Spanish Civil War.

== History and profile ==
El Be Negre took its name from the Catalan colloquial expression "...i un be negre!" (meaning "and a black sheep!"), an exclamation of rotund denial, skepticism or disbelief. The magazine originated in the Mirador literature, art and politics weekly and was inspired by the French language magazine Le Canard enchaîné, as well as in previous Catalan publications such as Papitu, La Campana de Gràcia and L'Esquella de la Torratxa. Its humor was more discreet and thought-provoking though, for it was witty, sharp and made liberal use of irony and ridicule.

El Be Negre was first published on 23 June 1931, only two months after the foundation of the Second Spanish Republic. Its founder was Amadeu Hurtado from the La Publicitat newspaper, together with Josep Maria Planes, Rossent Llates and Just Cabot. The director of the magazine was Josep Maria Planes. Other notable members of the team were Josep Maria de Segarra, Valentí Castanys i Borràs, Francesc Fontanals ("Soka"), Avel·lí Artís-Gener "Tisner", Manuel Amat, Ernest Guasp, Josep Maria Xicota, Andreu Avellí Artís, Carles Sinfeu, Enric Fernàndez Gual, Joan Cortès i Vidal, Joaquim Muntanyola, Salvador Mestres, Feliu Elíes ("Apa") and Romà Bonet ("Bon"). The headquarters of the magazines was in Barcelona.

In the same manner as ¡Cu-Cut! magazine had done two decades previously, El Be Negre steadfastly opposed Lerrouxism in Spain, Radical Republican Party leader Alejandro Lerroux becoming one of the favorite targets of its sharp and humorous criticism. Although its director Josep Maria Planes belonged to Acció Catalana, even that political group was not spared from the magazine's critical view. The magazine was also well known for its steadfast anti-fascist stance and among the foreign leaders criticized by the magazine's humor were Adolf Hitler and Benito Mussolini.

El Be Negre published its last issue on 15 July 1936, right before the pro-fascist coup that would lead to the Spanish Civil War, after having published a total of 245 issues. The magazine's director Josep Maria Planes would be assassinated following a series of articles on the street violence in Barcelona and its direct relationship with the activity of the Iberian Anarchist Federation (FAI).

== See also ==
- List of magazines in Spain
- Cu-Cut!
- Alejandro Lerroux
- L'Esquella de la Torratxa
