= Ricard Canals =

Spanish artist (1876–1931)

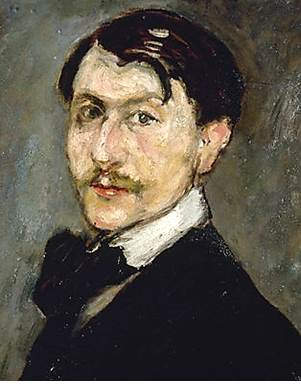
Self-portrait (1900s?)

Ricard Canals Llambí (13 December 1876 – 7 February 1931) was a Spanish Impressionist painter, illustrator and engraver; initially associated with the short-lived "Saffron Group" of Isidre Nonell; named after what critics said was their favorite color.

== Biography ==
Ricard Canals was born in Barcelona in 1876. He began his studies in 1893 at the Escola de la Llotja, but stayed only a short time before leaving to travel with friends. He ended up in Paris with Nonell, where he held a successful showing at "Le Barc de Boutteville", a gallery devoted to young artists. This enabled him to obtain Paul Durand-Ruel as an agent and exhibit throughout Europe and the United States.

Although many of his Parisian paintings were in Spanish costumbrista style, to appeal to his French clients, during this time he came under the influence of Renoir and Degas. He also continued a friendship with Picasso, whom he had met in Barcelona. In 1905, Picasso painted a portrait of the model, Benedetta Bianco, who would later become Canals' wife. The year before, Canals had painted "A Box at the Bullfight", which portrayed Bianco and Picasso's future partner, Fernande Olivier.

He returned to Barcelona in 1907. Three years later, he was named Chairman of the painting section of the newly founded association, "Les Arts i els Artistes". He remained a member until his death. The organization disbanded in 1936. During this time, he made long stays in Madrid, Seville and Granada, painting a wide variety of subjects, although he is especially remembered for his portraits. One of his last works involved decorating the ceiling of the City Council chambers in Barcelona. Canals died in Barcelona in 1931.

A major posthumous exhibition was held at the Sala Parés in 1933.

== Selected paintings ==
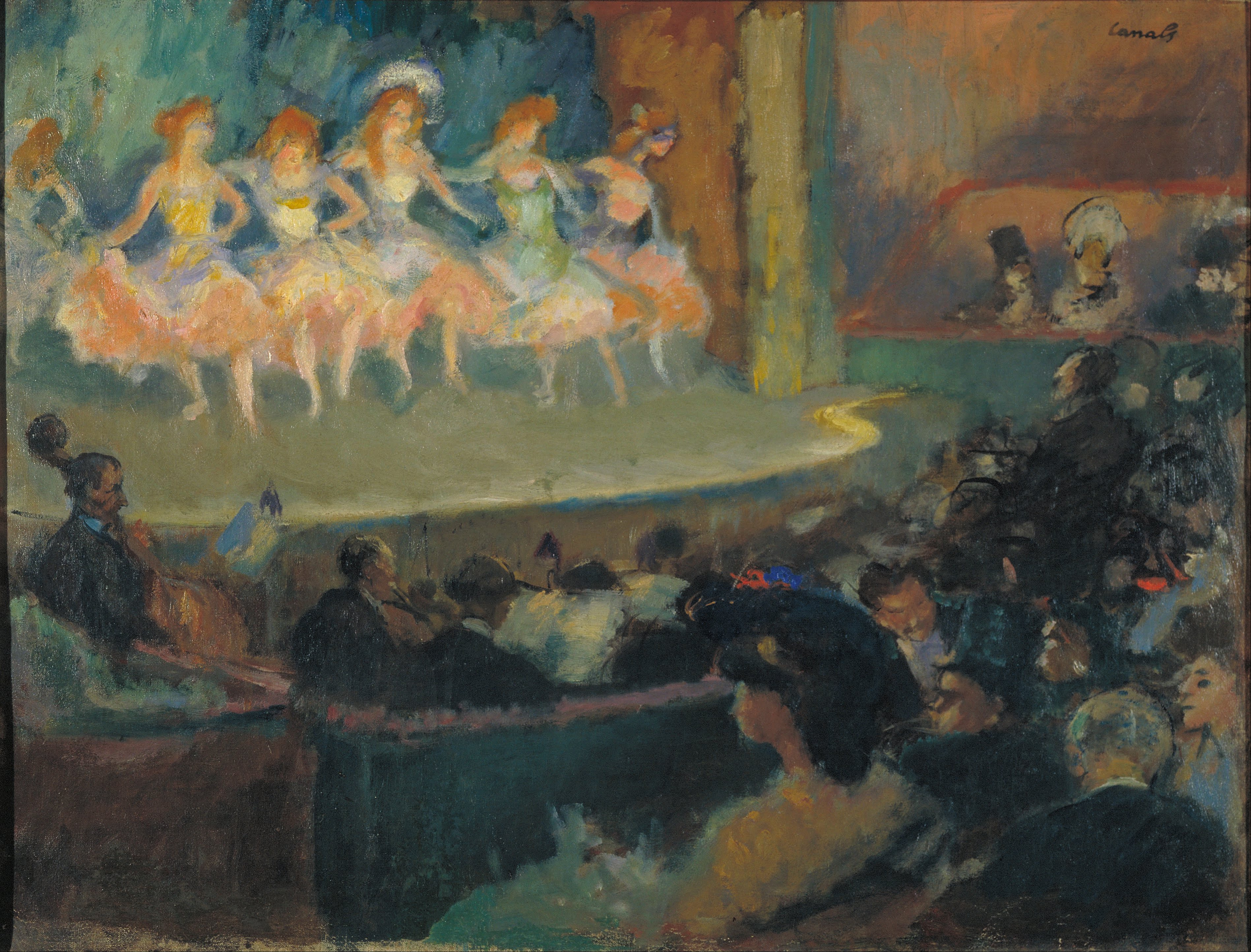
Café Concert (c.1903)

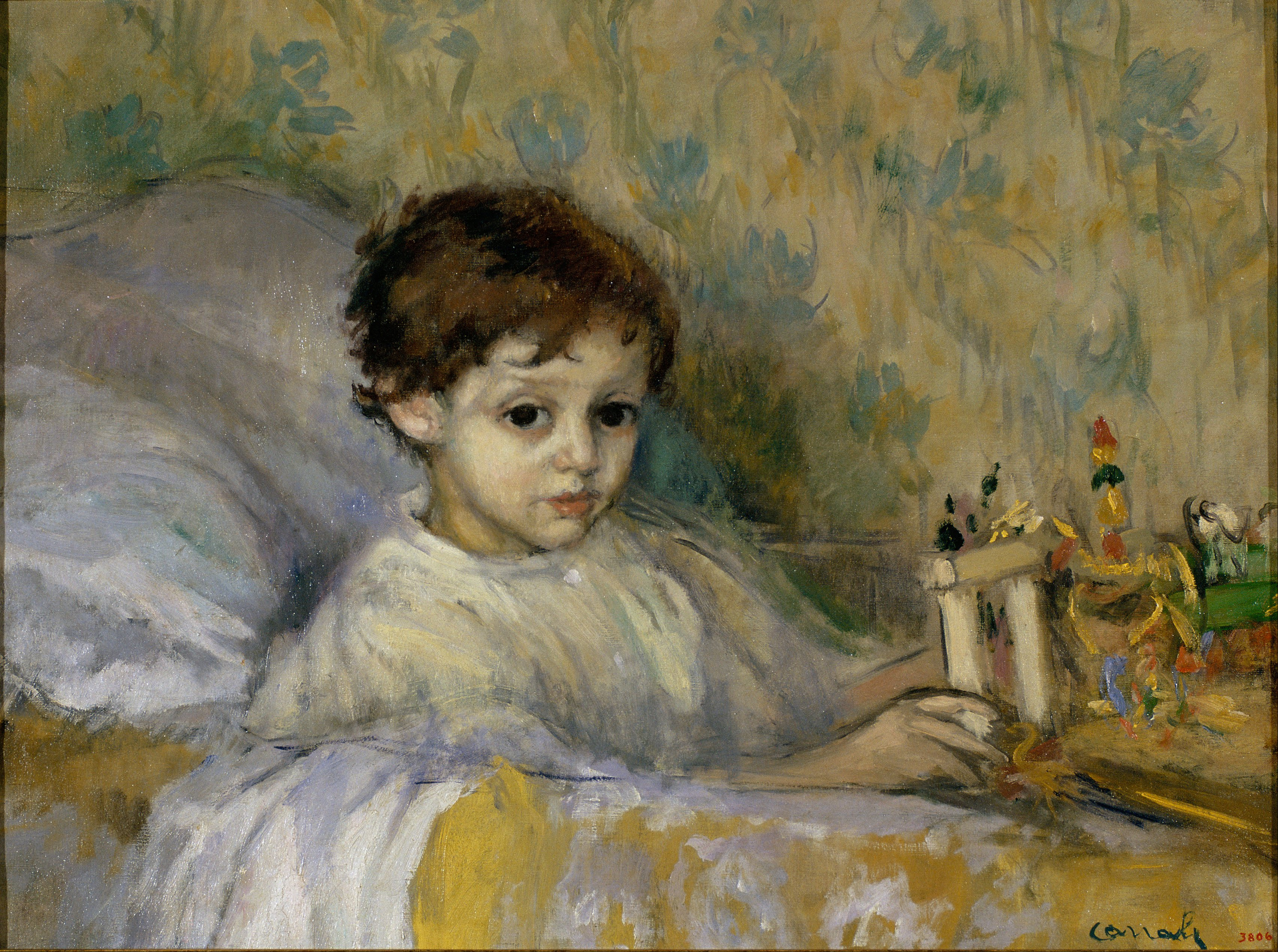
Sick Child (His son, Octavi) (c.1903)

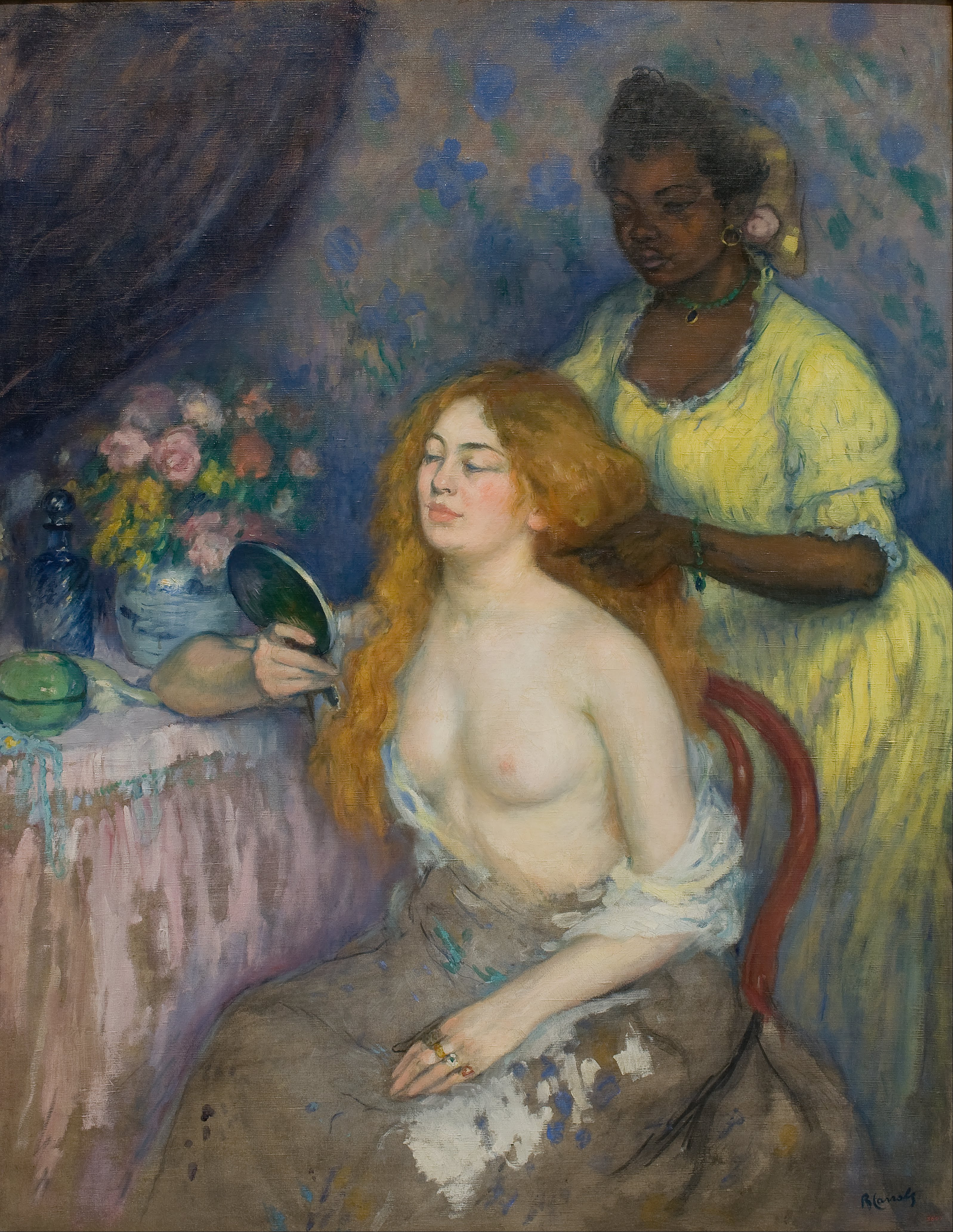
La Toilette (c.1903)

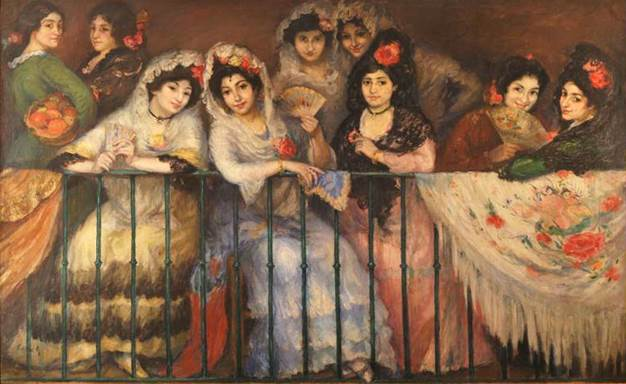
The Box at a Bullfight (1904)

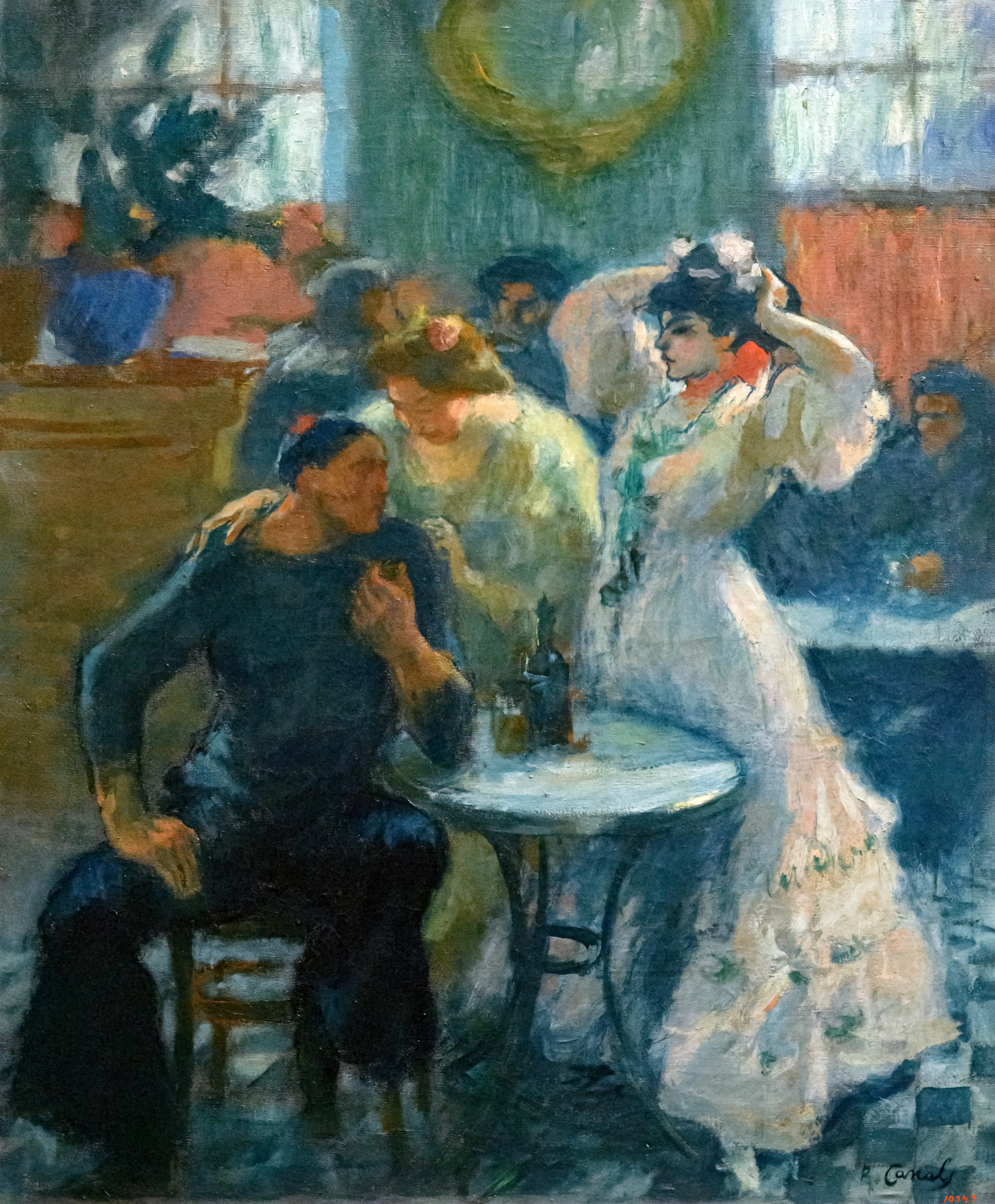
In the Bar (c.1910)
