= Prudenci Bertrana =

Catalan writer

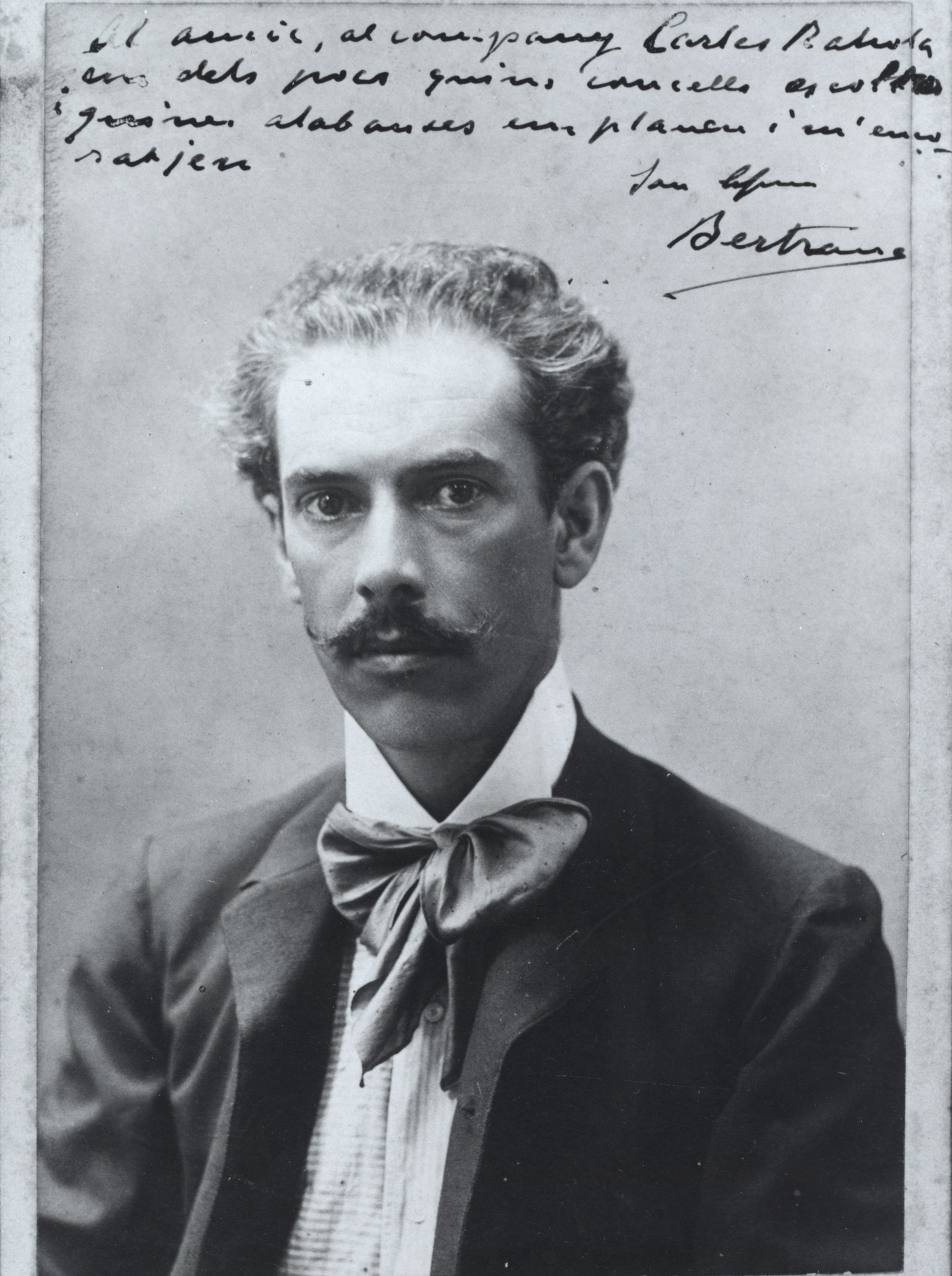
Portrait of Prudenci Bertrana

Prudenci Bertrana i Comte (Catalan pronunciation: [pɾuˈðɛnsi βəɾˈtɾanə]; Tordera, 19 January 1867 - Barcelona, 21 November 1941) was an important modernist writer in Catalan.

== Biography ==
During his youth, he studied at Girona. Some years later, he went to Barcelona to pursue a course in industrial engineering and managed such magazines as L'Esquella de la Torratxa or La Campana de Gràcia. He worked as a journalist and also taught art. Bertrana also collaborated with other newspapers such as El Poble Català, La Publicitat, Revista de Catalunya and La Veu de Catalunya.

His style is certainly distinguished in relation to the fashions of the moment. He is quite known because of his novel Josafat (1906), the book with which began his literary production, and also for his short story collection Proses bàrbares (Barbarous prose, 1911). He published his first stories in 1903, and some of them have been considered of an excellent quality. His works (specially short stories) are based on three principal aspects: landscape, peasants and animals. Bertrana's novels, structured from a careful and detailed observation of the world, are grounded in his own life experience as a writer and a man of his time. It is, however, with the trilogy Entre la terra i els núvols (Between the Earth and the Clouds), comprising L'hereu (The heir, 1931), El vagabund (The vagrant, 1933) i L'impenitent (The unrepentant, 1948), where an autobiographic purpose is most clearly reflected, based on his personal frustration, the hardest part of which was the death of three of his sons. In 1933 he won the Fastenrath Award for his play El Comiat de Teresa (Teresa's Farewell, 1932).

He died in 1941 in Barcelona. His daughter Aurora's memoir, contains many references to her father.
