= Bagaria =

Spanish caricaturist (1882–1940)

Lluís Bagaria i Bou
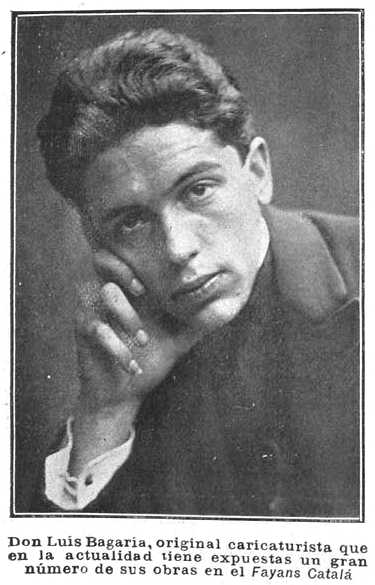
- Louis Bagaria 1910
- Born: 1882; Barcelona
- Died: 1940 (aged 57–58); Havana
- Occupation: caricaturists
- Known for: published in L'Esquella de la Torratxa and ¡Cu-Cut!

Lluís Bagaria i Bou (1882 in Barcelona – 1940 in Havana) one of the most important Spanish caricaturists in the first half of the 20th century. His drawings, in a synthetic and decorative style, were published in the most important journals of Spain, including L'Esquella de la Torratxa and ¡Cu-Cut! between 1906 and 1940.

He was born in Barcelona, but it was in Madrid where he achieved great popularity and fame. He published in the journal El Sol and drew the covers of España magazine. His caricatures against fascism during the war provoked his exile to Paris and into Cuba.

== Bibliography ==
- Luis Bagaría. Dibujos humorísticos. Cat. Expo. La Habana: Museo Nacional Masónico Aurelio Miranda Álvarez, 1958
- Luis Bagaria, 1882-1940, Cat. Expo. Madrid: Biblioteca Nacional / Ministerio de Cultura, 1983
- Antonio ELORZA. Luis Bagaría. El humor y la política. Barcelona: Anthropos, 1988
- Lluís Bagaria. Caricaturista del món barceloní. Cat. Expo. Sabadell: Museu d'art de Sabadell, 2003
- Emilio MARCOS VILLALÓN. Luis Bagaria. Entre el arte y la política. Madrid: Biblioteca Nueva, 2004
- Bagaría en El Sol. Política y humor en la crisis de la restauración. Cat. Expo. Madrid: Fundación Mapfre, 2007
- Jaume CAPDEVILA. Bagaria. La guerra no fa riure. Barcelona: Dux Elm, 2007
