= Isidre Bonsoms i Sicart =

- Born: 1849; Barcelona
- Died: 14 November 1922; Valldemossa, Mallorca
- Occupation(s): bibliophile and cervantist

Isidre Bonsoms i Sicart (1849 – 14 November 1922) was a Catalan bibliophile and cervantist.

He was born in Barcelona. In 1910 he donated to the Biblioteca de Catalunya an important collection of historical-political leaflets regarding events of the history of Catalonia from the 16th to the 19th centuries, most of them printed in Catalonia.

It contains relations of events, legal dispositions, public announcements, edicts, flying sheets and satirical posters. He had also gathered a large number of legal proceedings and decisions, political speeches, sermons preached regarding diverse events, printed matter of local interest, novels and other brief treatises of different topics. It includes relations, notices and news gazettes, too.

In 1914 Bonsoms communicated to the Biblioteca de Catalunya his plan of donating the Cervantine Collection of 3,367 volumes by, or relating to, Miguel de Cervantes. Delivered in 1915, it is one of the leading collections on the topic of Cervantes, including the words of Cervantes works in original language and translations, works of biographical character and literary criticism, as well as inspired or adapted works of Cervantine iconography. As of 2018, the collection consists of approximately 9,000 volumes and includes the first editions of every Cervantine work in original language and translations; except for La Galatea, which is conserved in the form of a very rare second edition. The Collection includes the first six editions of Don Quixote (part 1, 1605), bibliophile items and publications of the Cervantine work in more than 50 languages. Bonsoms died in Valldemossa, Mallorca, aged 73.

In honor of the donor, the Institut d'Estudis Catalans created the Isidre Bonsoms Award to recognize "the best work of investigation, publishing, bibliography, art, critic[ism], biography or music on Cervantes works and on the novels and stories of knighthood and adventures that preceded Don Quixote, as well as on those that it has motivated or influenced".

== Bibliography ==
- Cincuenta años de la antigua Biblioteca de Catalunya. Barcelona: Biblioteca Central de la Diputación de Barcelona, DL 1968.
- La correspondencia entre Isidre Bonsoms Sicart y Archer Milton Huntington: el coleccionismo de libros antiguos y objetos de arte. Barcelona: Reial Acadèmia de Bones Lletres; Associació de Bibliófils de Barcelona, 2010.
