= Barcelona Cómica =

Spanish magazine

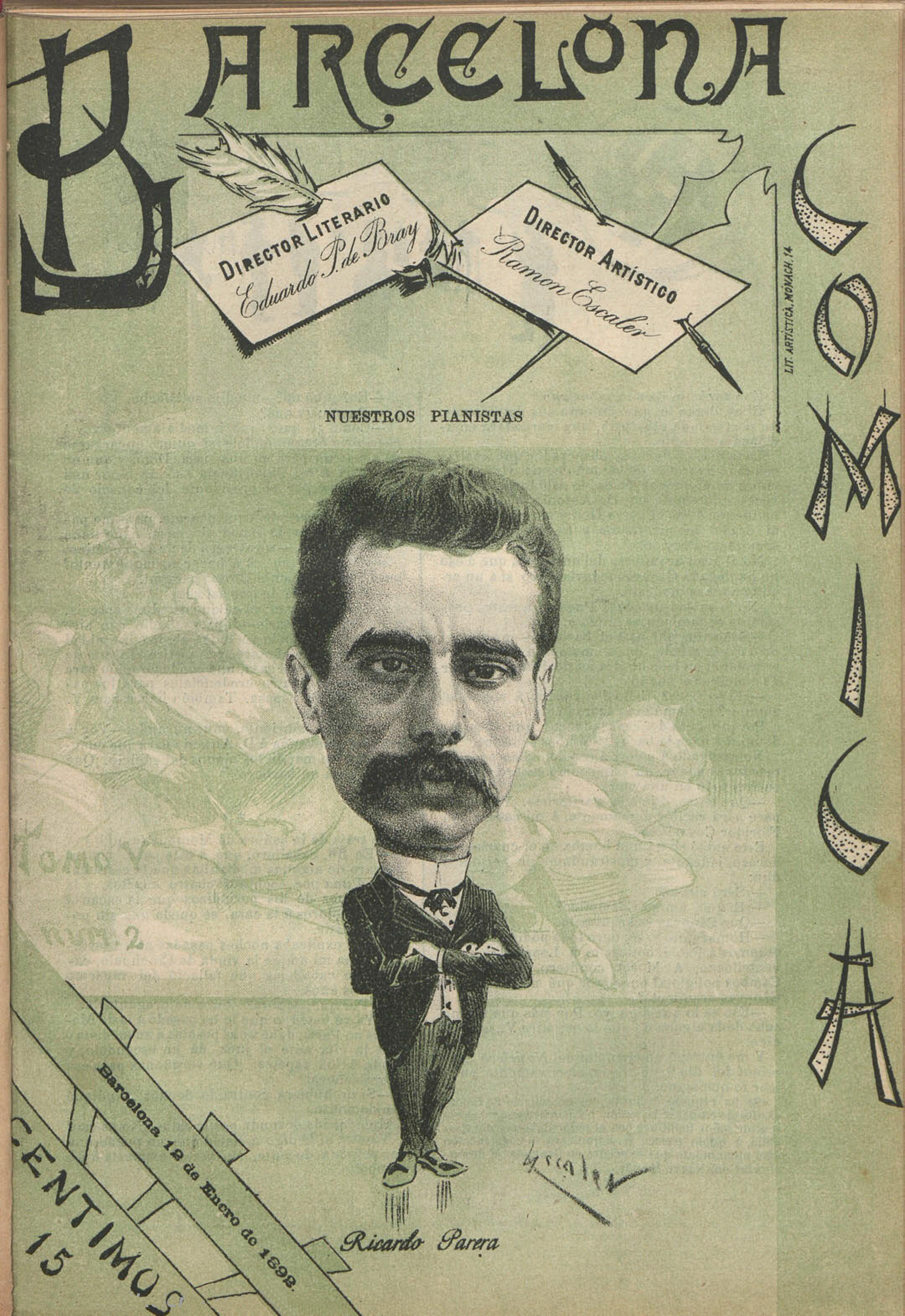
1892 edition of the magazine.

Barcelona Cómica was a satirical Spanish language magazine published between 1889 and 1900. The magazine covered satirical work.
