= La Campana de Gràcia =

Catalan satirical seminal weekly magazine

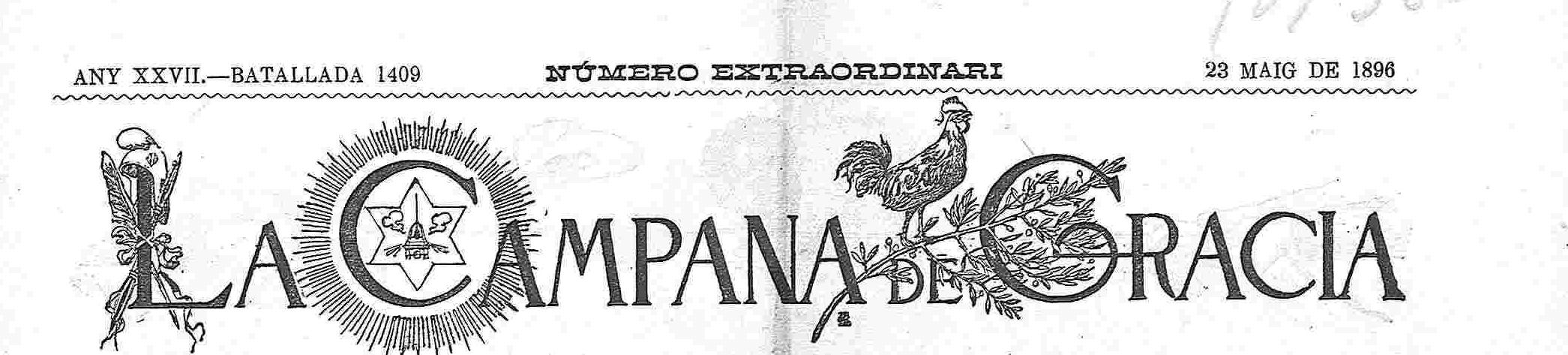

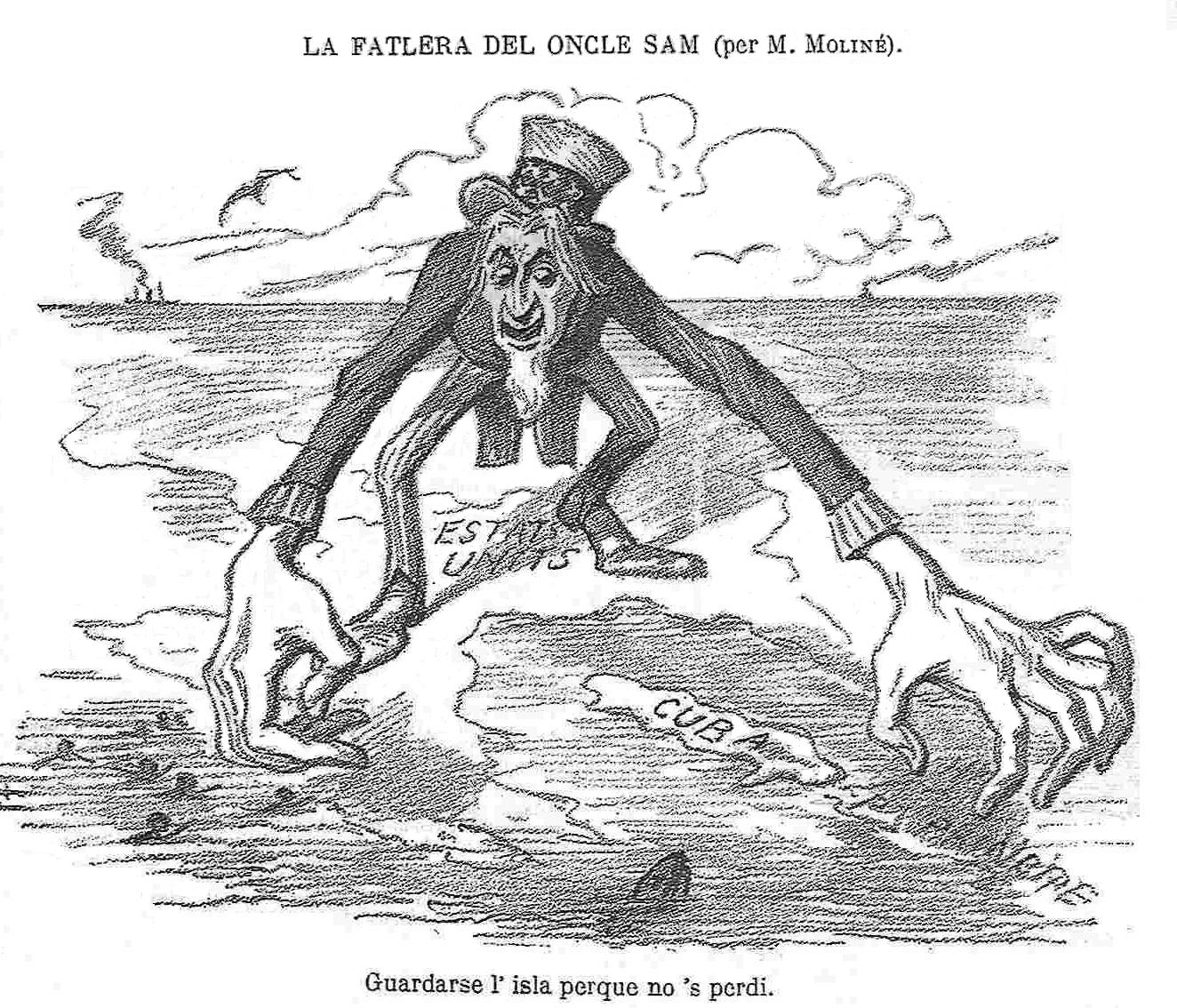
- A published satirical drawing criticising the U.S. behaviour regarding Cuba by Manuel Moliné, just prior to the Spanish–American War. Upper text reads (in old Catalan): "Uncle Sam's craving", and below: "To keep the island so it won't get lost."
- Categories: Satirical magazine
- Frequency: Weekly
- Founder: Inocencio López Bernagosi
- Founded: 1870
- First issue: 8 May 1870
- Final issue: 1934
- Company: Republican Left of Catalonia
- Country: Spain
- Based in: Barcelona
- Language: Catalan; Spanish
- ISSN: 1576-3722
- OCLC: 801821684

La Campana de Gràcia (Catalan pronunciation: [lə kəmˈpanə ðə ˈɣɾasiə]; lit. 'The bell of Gràcia') was a seminal Catalan weekly magazine of satire, written bilingually in Catalan and Spanish of the late 19th and early 20th century, staunchly supportive of republicanism and anticlericalism. The headquarters was in Barcelona.

== History and profile ==
La Campana de Gràcia was founded in 1870 by Innocenci López i Bernagossi and was edited for 64 years. The magazine was first published on 8 May 1870. The magazine was published on a weekly basis. Although at first it focused on the Spanish politics of the time, often leaving out Catalan politics and Catalanist actions, its ideological tone changed over time and by 1906 it openly expressed support for Solidaritat Catalana and Catalan working-class left-wing political issues. From 1932 until its last issue in 1934, it was owned by ERC. Two of its most notable directors were Antonio Sierra and Prudenci Bertrana.

== See also ==
- El Be Negre
- L'Esquella de la Torratxa
