= Eusebi Planas =

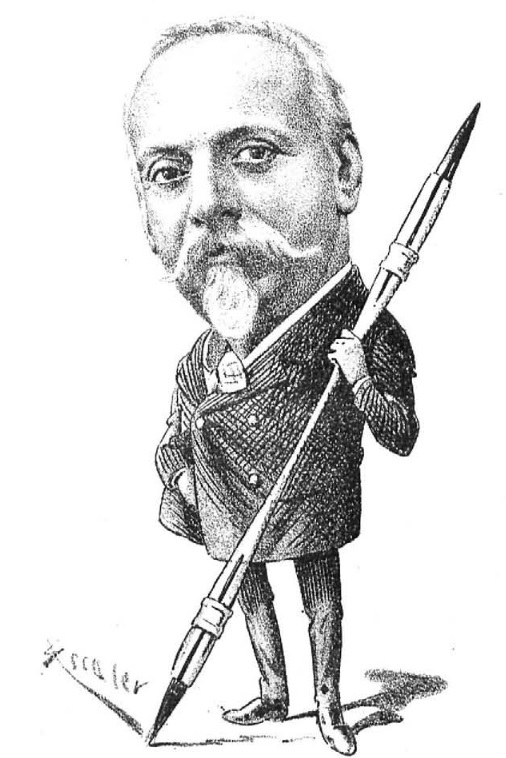
Eusebi Planas; by Ramon Escaler (1891)

From Las Mujeres Españolas, Americanas y Lusitanas (1886)
by Faustina Sáez de Melgar

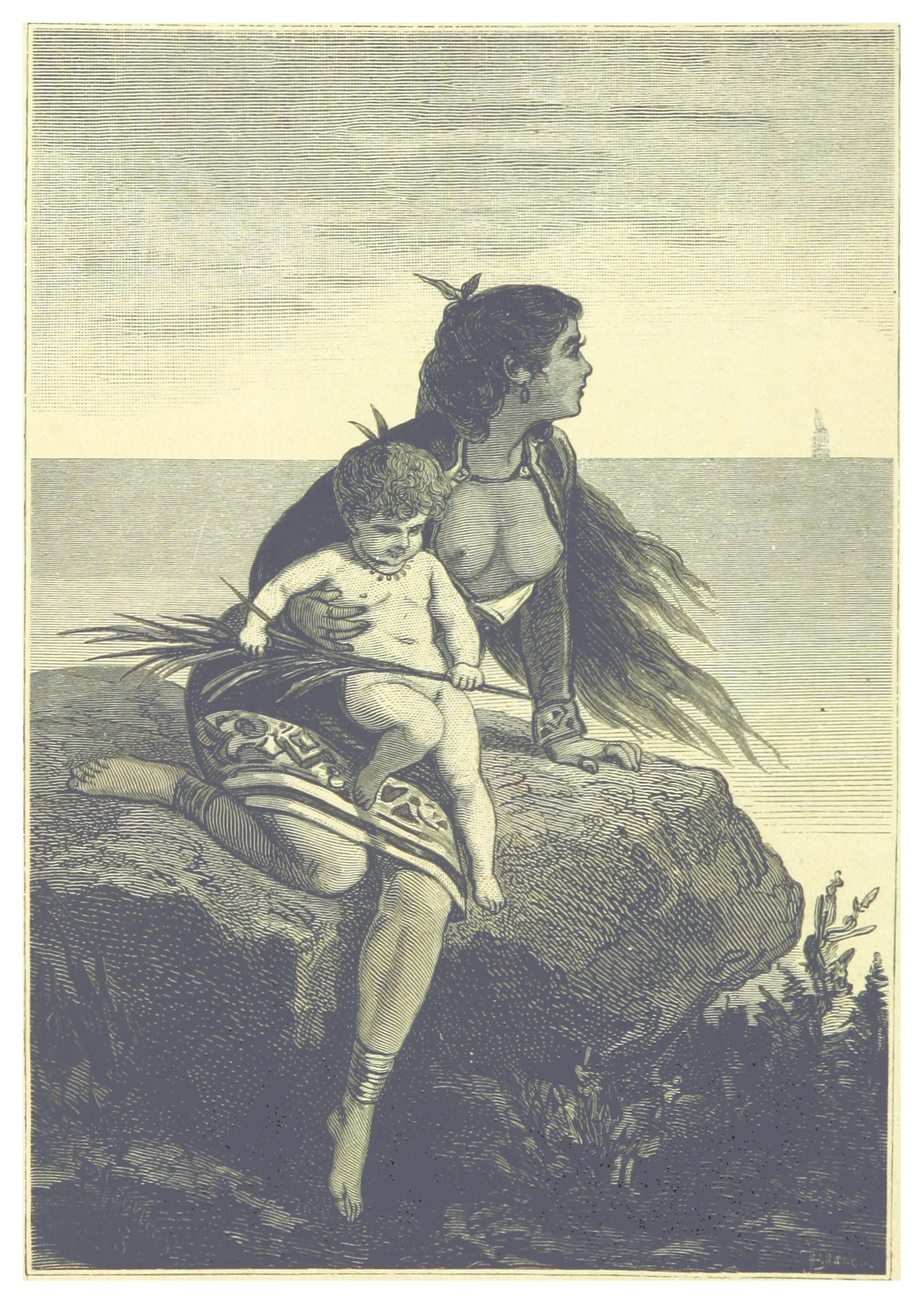
The Philippine Princess

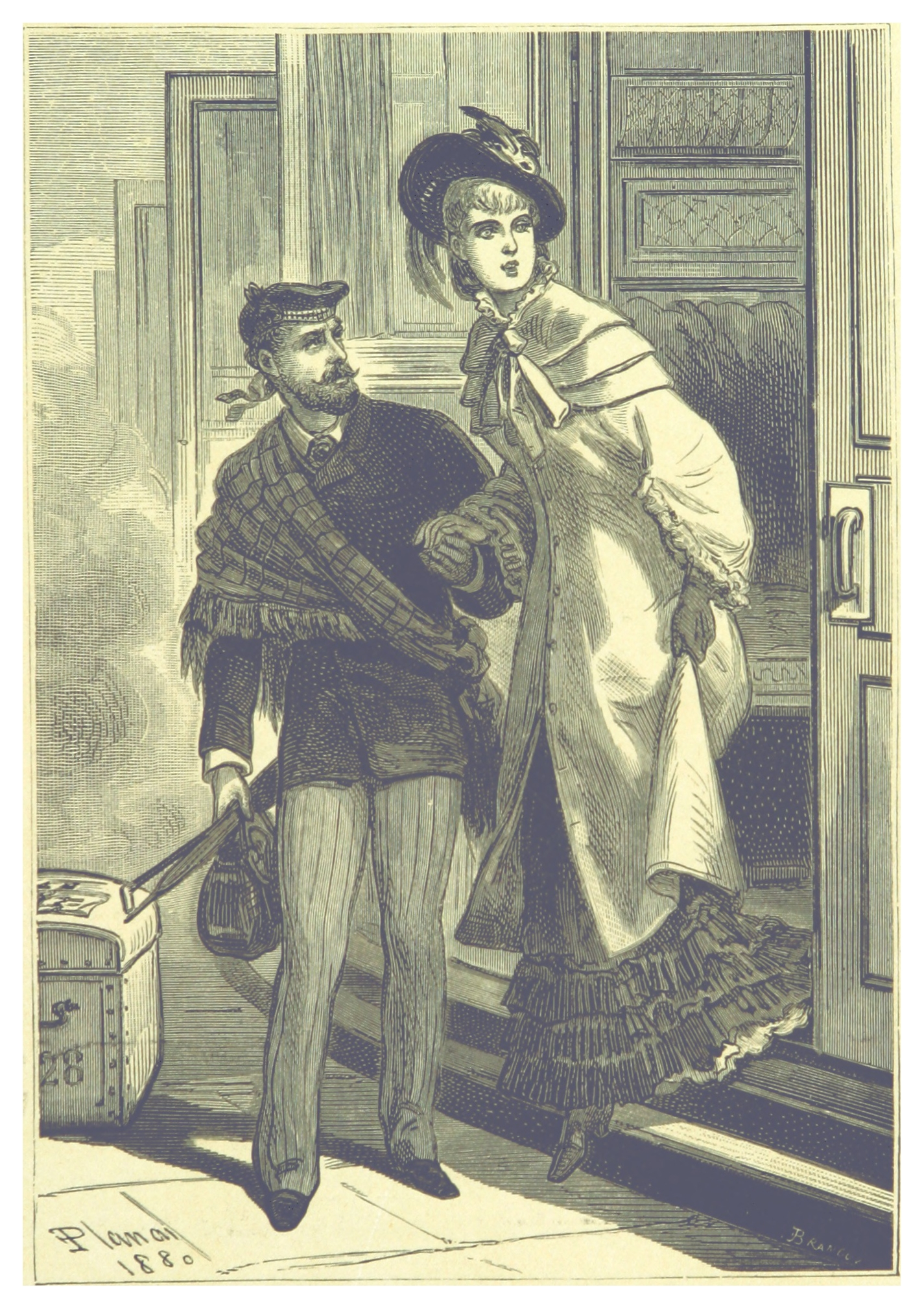
The North American

Eusebi Planas i Franquesa (1833, Barcelona - 13 March 1897, Barcelona)) was a Catalan graphic artist, lithographer and watercolorist.

== Life and work ==
His family wanted him to study law, but his artistic inclinations prevailed, and he found work with a lithographer. He later enrolled at the Escola de la Llotja and took classes at a private academy. In 1849, he went to Paris to perfect his techniques, under the direction of Émile Lassalle. He soon began working for the art dealer and publisher, Adolphe Goupil, providing him with illustrations and lithographs of paintings.

In 1854, a cholera epidemic made him decide to return to Barcelona, where he continued to produce illustrations; notably for The Three Musketeers and Les Misérables. He also made enhancements to photographs, as well as posters and flyers for public and private events. In addition, he is credited with documenting notable feminine prototypes for beauty, in such works as Historia de Una Mujer (History of a Woman, 1880).

While being praised for certain images of women, he also became infamous for two series of erotic and pornographic scenes; El Noble Arte del Billar and El Noble Juego del Tresillo (Literally translated; "The Noble Art of Billiards" and "The Noble Game of Triplets"); issued anonymously. Some satirical drawings were signed with the pseudonym "Felipó".
