= Apel·les Mestres =

Catalan writer and graphic artist (1854-1936)

Apel·les Mestres i Oñós
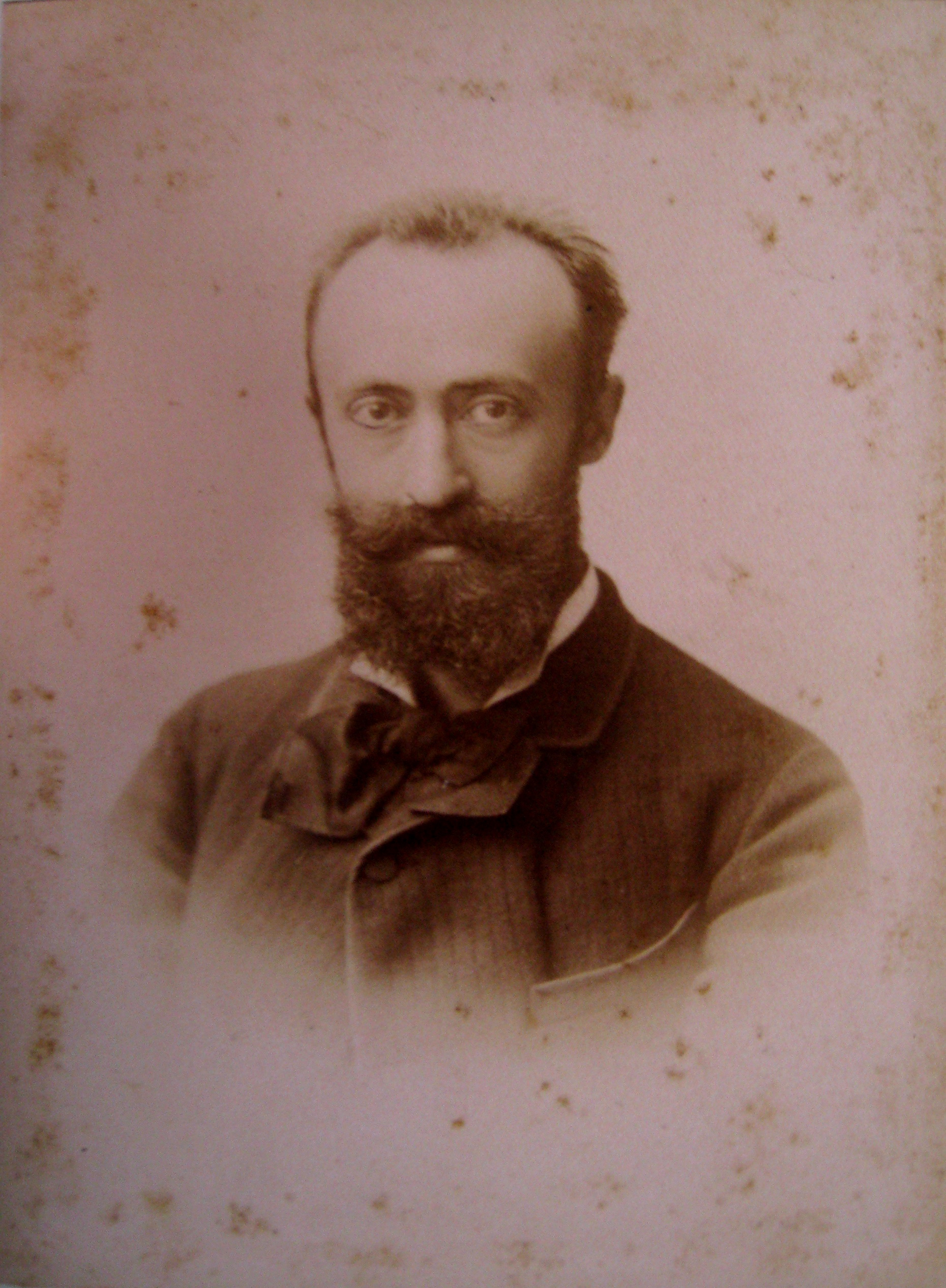
- Photograph by Antonio Napoleon (1884)
- Born: Apel·les Mestres i Oñós; October 28, 1854; Barcelona, Spain
- Died: July 19, 1936 (aged 81); Barcelona, Spain
- Education: Escola de la Llotja
- Known for: Illustration, poetry, graphic art
- Style: Caricature, symbolic illustration
- Movement: Modernisme
- Spouse: Laura Radénez
- Awards: Cross of the Legion of Honor

Signature
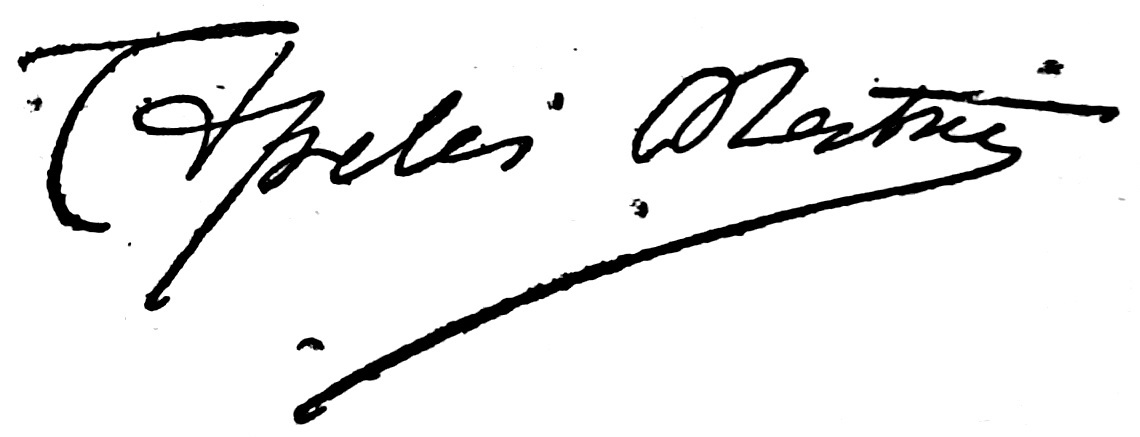

Apel·les Mestres i Oñós (28 October 1854, Barcelona – 19 July 1936, Barcelona) was a Catalan writer, graphic artist, and illustrator.

== Biography ==
His father, Josep Oriol Mestres, was an architect who participated in numerous major project, including the demolition of the city walls. He attended a French secondary school, and studied at the Escola de la Llotja, where he showed a talent for caricatures. His teachers included Antoni Caba, Lluís Rigalt, Claudi Lorenzale and Ramon Martí Alsina.

He made several extended visits to Switzerland with his friend, the journalist and playwright, Pompeu Gener, where he was influenced by Swiss federalism, the poetry of Heinrich Heine, and the comic drawings of Rodolphe Töpffer. He would later work for some of the most important magazines of that time; contributing comics, jokes, and headline designs.

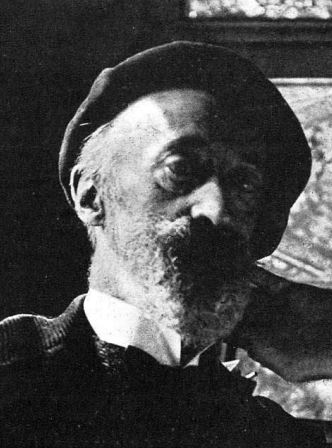
Apel·les Mestres - Mestre en Gai Saber 1908

In 1885, he married Laura Radénez, a Parisian with some artistic talent. They had no children. Their home, a narrow apartment in the old part of town, with a garden of hydrangeas on the roof, became a meeting place for the creative community of Barcelona.

He considered books to be a global art form, and was involved in every step of the process; including the paper, the cover and the binding. In 1912, he had to abandon drawing, due to a visual impairment. Two years later, he had become almost blind. He continued his creative activities however; improvising songs on the piano, then having them harmonized and written down by professional musicians. His songs have been recorded by many notable performers, including Conchita Badía.

In 1915, he wrote a book of poems about World War I, Flors de Sang (Flowers of Blood), which gained him several awards, including a Cross of the Legion of Honor, from the French government. Later, these poems would become very popular with Republican forces during the Spanish Civil War. He died shortly after it had begun.

In 1938, a marble monument was dedicated to him, in a park at the foot of Tibidabo. A literary prize for illustrated children's books bears his name.

Illustrations from Liliana (1907)

== Gallery ==
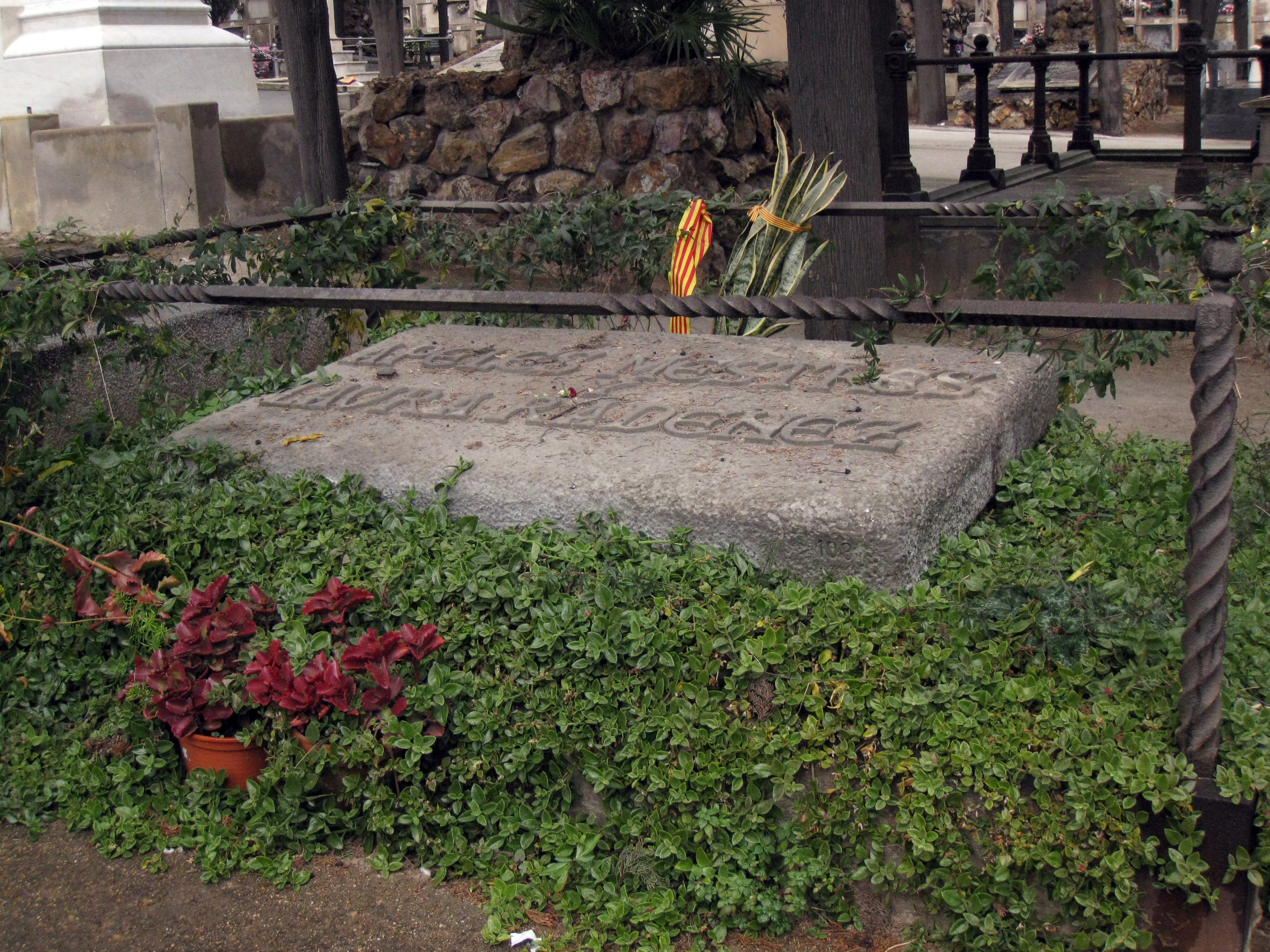
Tomb of Apel·les Mestres at Cementiri del Poblenou, Barcelona

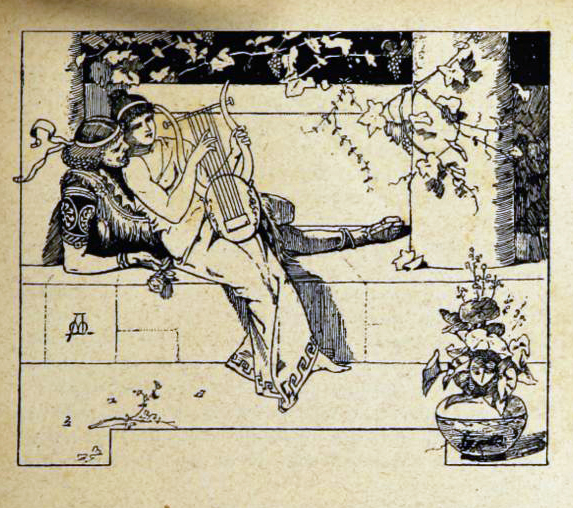
"The Pharaoh’s Daughter" (1881)

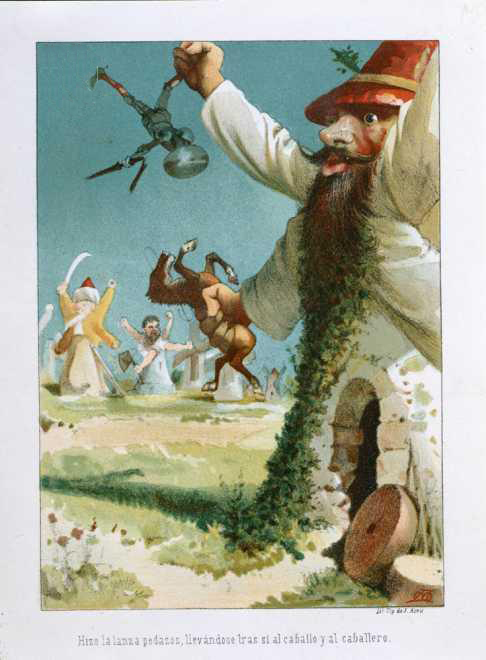
A fanciful version of fighting the windmills, from Don Quixote

"Death and the Devil" (1884–1885)

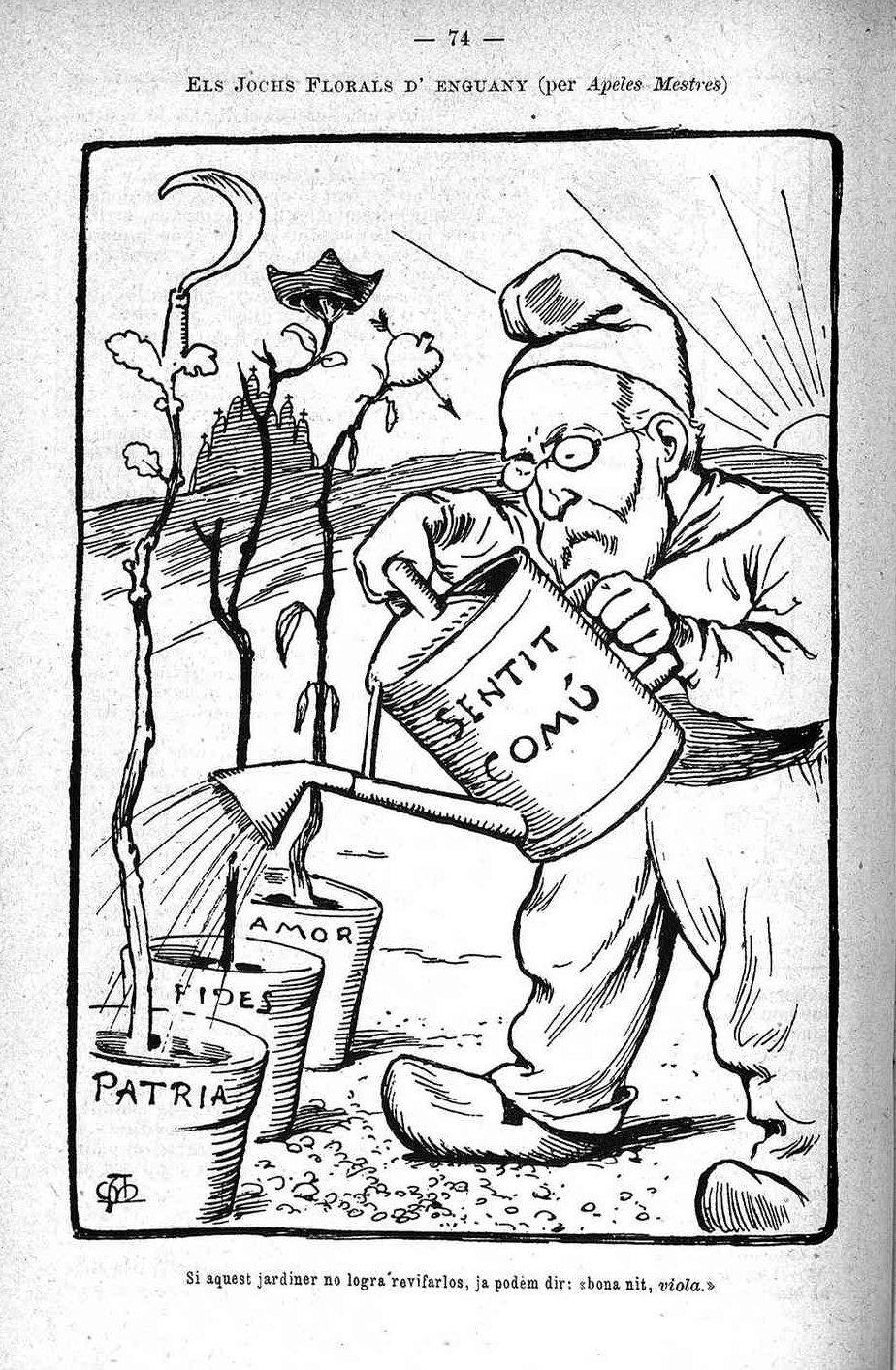
Caricature in Almanach de La Esquella de la Torratxa (1902)

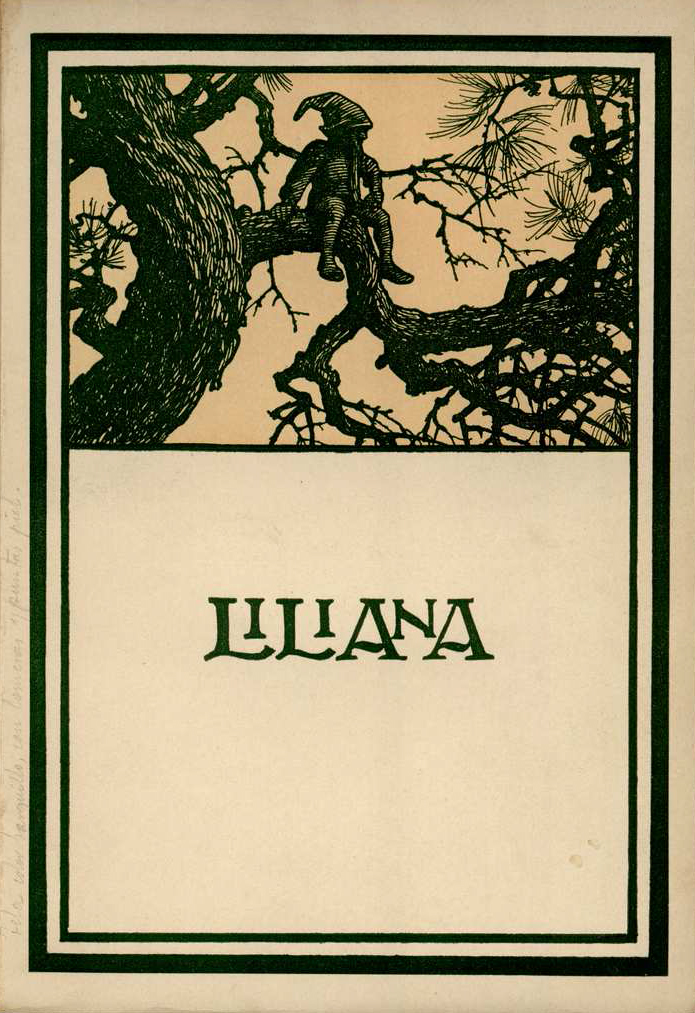
Collection Liliana (1907)

Illustration from the collection Liliana

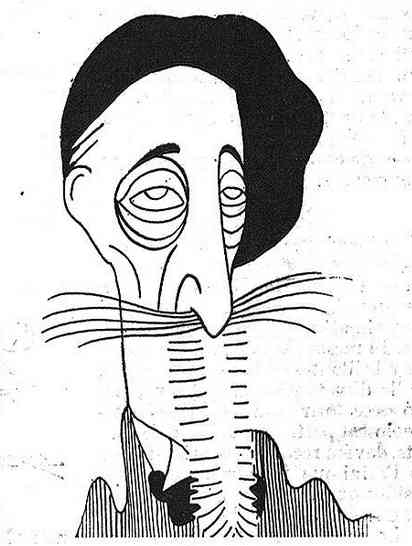
Caricature of Apel·les Mestres by Bagaria, published in La Esquella de la Torratxa (8 May 1908), in the series Galería cómica dels Mestres vius

== Sources ==
- Joan Armangué i Herrero, Obra primerenca d'Apel·les Mestres (1872-1886), Ed. Abadia de Montserrat, 2007 ISBN 978-84-84159-65-0
- Josep Maria Ainaud de Lasarte (Ed.), Apel·les Mestres (1854-1936). En el cinquantenari de la seva mort. 1936-1986, Fundació Jaume I, 1985
- Mateu Avellaneda and Joana Escobedo (Eds.), La meva col·lecció Apel·les Mestres, Biblioteca de Catalunya, 2005 ISBN 978-84-7845-153-1
