= Cala Forn =

1917 painting by Joaquim Sunyer

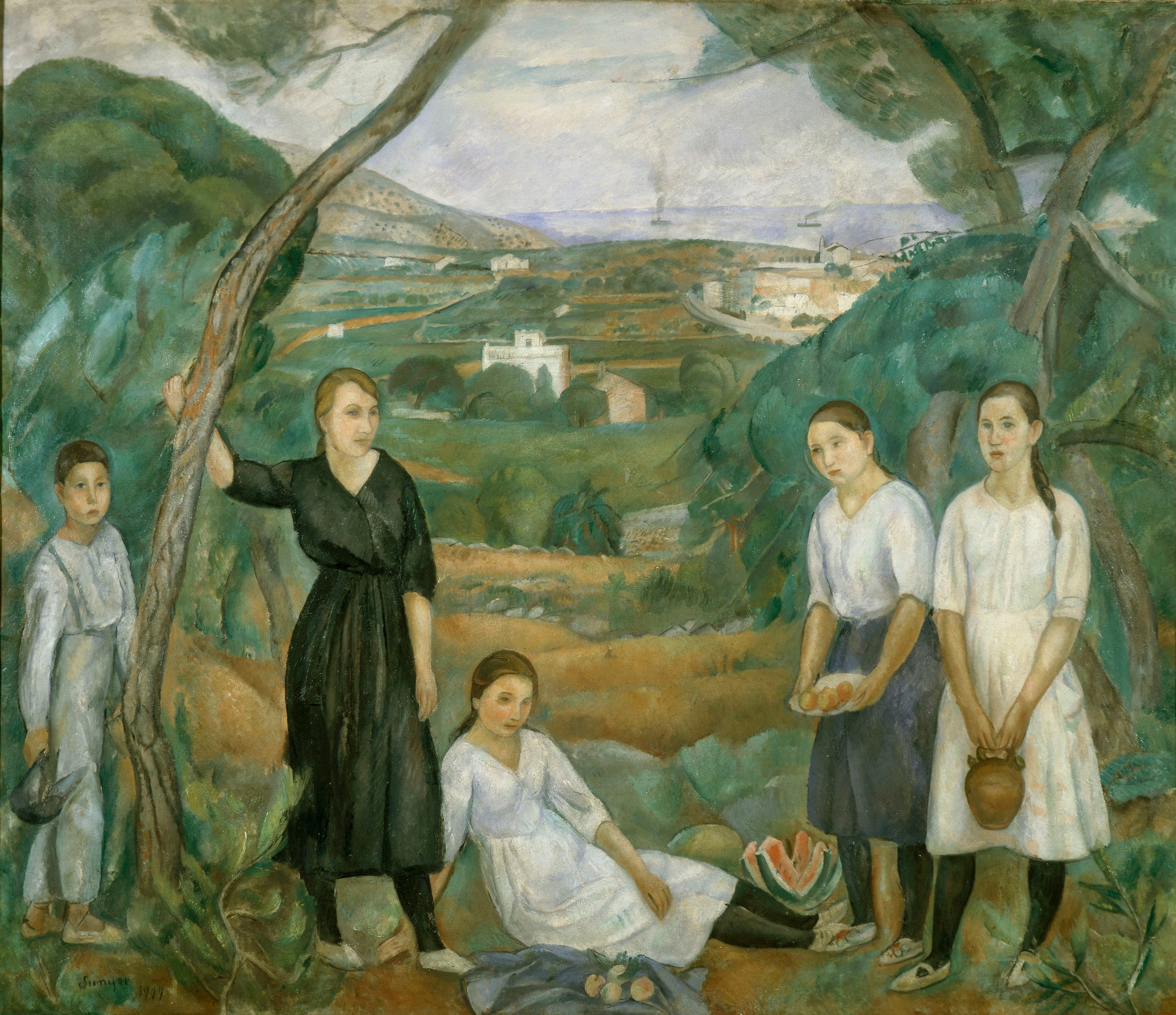
- Artist: Joaquim Sunyer
- Year: 1917
- Medium: Oil on canvas
- Dimensions: 120 cm × 140,5 cm (47 in × 553 in)
- Location: Museu Nacional d'Art de Catalunya; Barcelona

Cala Forn is a painting by Joaquim Sunyer currently exhibited at the National Art Museum of Catalonia.

== History ==
After a few years in Paris, where he was influenced by the French Post-Impressionists before adopting a language similar to Cézanne's, Sunyer returned to Catalonia, where he made his name as the leader of Noucentisme, an artistic movement that preached a return to classical models and upheld figurative art in opposition to the avant-garde movements. Cala Forn, one of Sunyer's and Noucentisme's most paradigmatic works, marked the peak of his creative development. With its great expressive power and feeling, the artist achieves perfect integration of the figures in the landscape, not limiting them to reproductions of everyday reality but turning them into symbols of the Catalonia of the time.
