= Masó House =

Coordinates: 41.9860°N 2.8246°E

Masó House is the birthplace of Rafael Masó i Valentí (1880–1935). It is also one of the most important works of architecture in Girona, in Catalonia, Spain. Offering unparalleled views of the city, it is the only one of the famous houses on the Onyar River open to the public. The house has been preserved with the furniture and decoration in Noucentisme style.

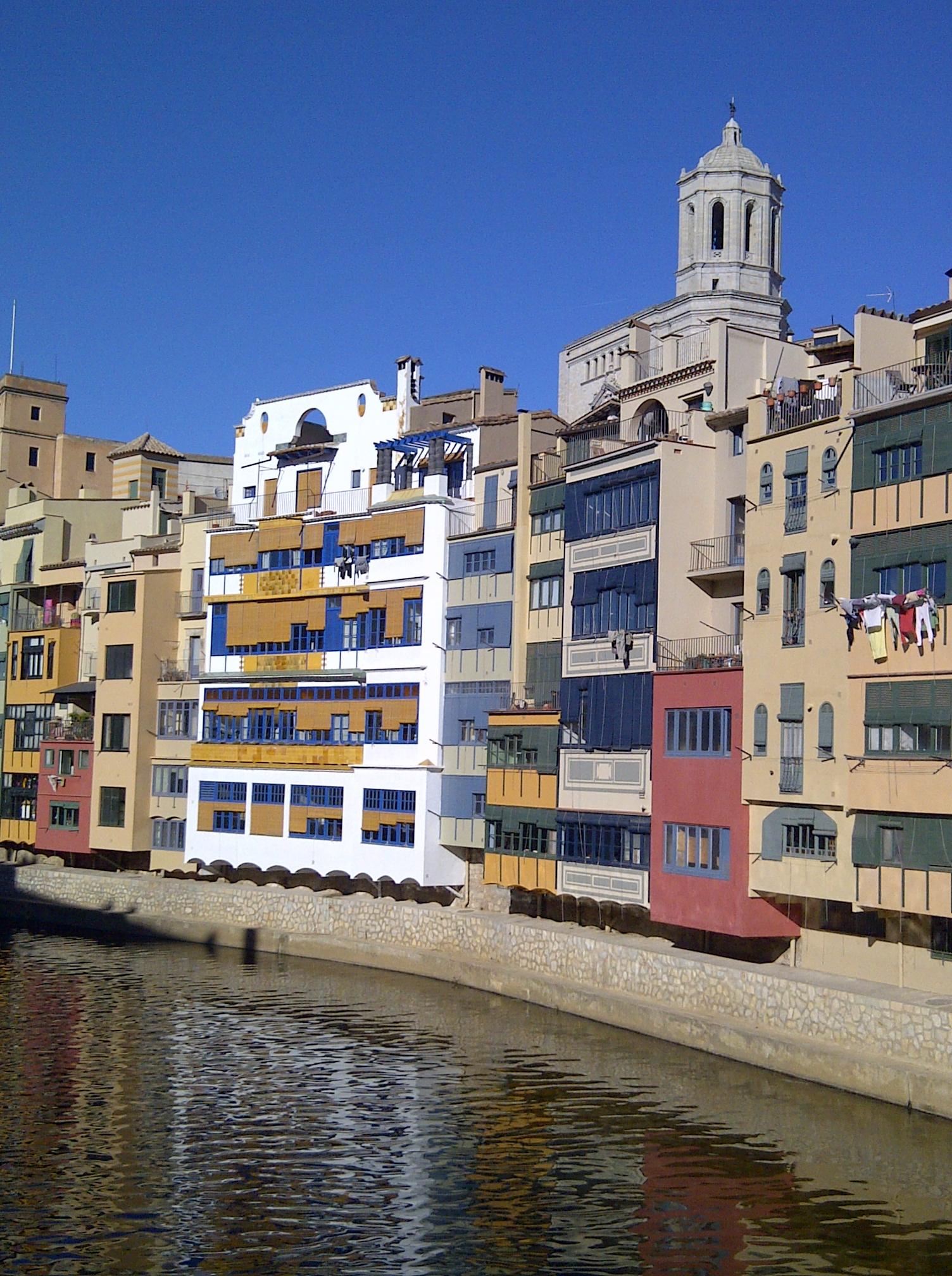
The river facade, Girona

== Facade ==
A cursory study of the facade reveals Masó House was the result of the merging of four separate dwellings acquired by the Masó Valentí family between the mid-19th century and the early 20th century. Today's facade is the result of the renovation work carried out by Rafael Masó between 1911 and 1919, the same time he unified and updated the interior spaces. The most outstanding element is the bow window on the third floor. On the ground floor, the architect's father managed the Masó Press, where he edited and printed the Diario de Gerona de Avisos y Noticias newspaper between 1889 and 1936. The large first-floor balcony was a privileged vantage point for watching the festivals and parades on Ballesteries Street.

== Entrance ==
In 1911–12, Masó renovated the main entrance to the house, with the intention of reinforcing the image and prestige of his family by forging links with old Girona tradition. To his end, he combined elements from history (heraldic coats of arms on the tiled wainscoting), religion ( St Narcissus bas-relief and St Paula panel), and the vernacular architecture (semi-circular arches, wrought iron, stonework, and glazed ceramics).

== Hall ==
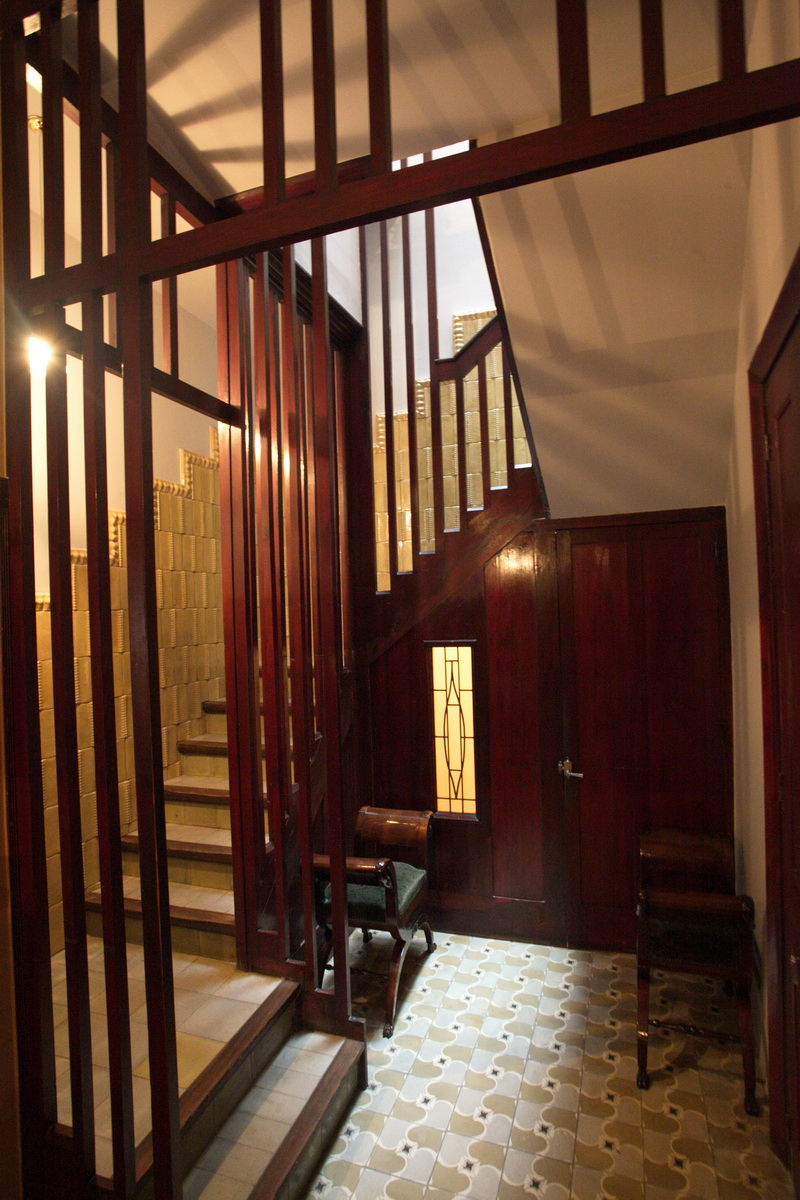
Hall and stairs inside Casa Masó

The predominance of wood, and the cream and chocolate colors of the hall transmit a warm, welcoming feeling to the home. The repetition of vertical, elongated geometrical shapes (decorative frieze below the ceiling, wainscoting, and stairway woodwork), and the brightness coming from the skylight at the back enabled Masó to create a sense of large, orderly, sober space. An outstanding feature is the French clock dating from the mid-19th century.

== Dining room ==
The dining room was the scene of all the family celebrations. In this room, Masó was best able to express the noucentista concept of the home as an austere but comfortable place, a harmonious whole with great attention to detail, of humble traditional appearance but filled with cultured references. Outstanding features include objects designed by the architect, in particular the hanging lamp, the stained glass, the sideboard, and the cabinet, as well as the Woman with bundle (ca 1906) figure by noucentista sculptor Enric Casanovas.

== Gallery and sewing room ==
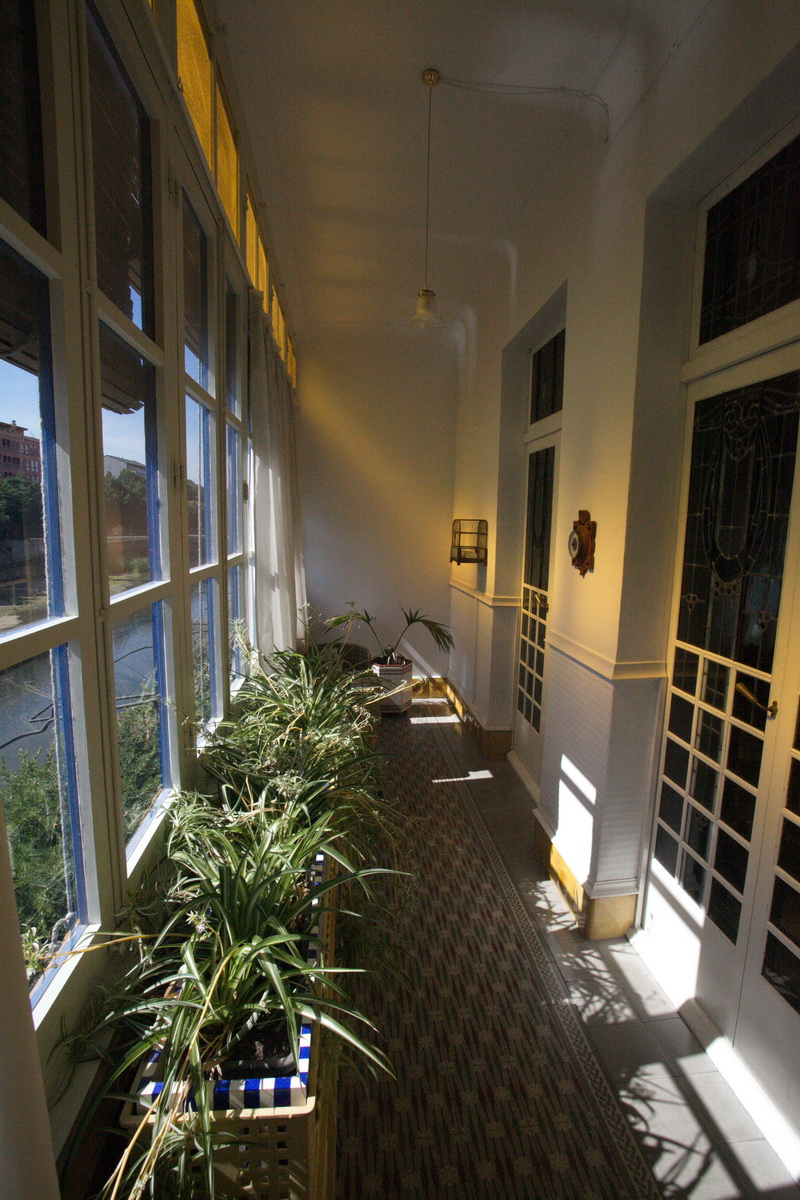
Gallery overlooking the river

Due to the slight curve of the River Onyar at this point, the glassed-in galleries provide a unique perspective of the River Onyar and its bridges, as well as the other houses overlooking the river. These were spaces for sewing, mending, and embroidering the enormous amount of clothing and household linen belonging to the large Masó family. The architect himself designed monograms and other motifs for pillowcases, cushions, handkerchiefs, tablecloths, bedspreads and quilts, which were embroidered by his wife and his sisters.

In the gallery, we can see several planters designed by Masó with a geometrical decoration very similar to that used by Charles Rennie Mackintosh and to the Gitterwerk conceived by Josef Hoffmann and Koloman Moser for the Wiener Werkstätte.

== Kitchen ==
The kitchen and the spiral staircase leading to the service quarters on the third floor recall the other persons living in the house: the cook and the maids who worked for the Masó family. Day-to-day living and the numerous parties and traditions of the time depended on the constant presence of servants, who took care of the children, as well as looking after the meals, the daily chores, and all the other aspects of running a household.

== Library and office ==
Santiago Masó (1878–1960), the eldest of the Masó Valentí siblings, inherited the family house on the death of both parents. He became a Doctor of Law in 1903 and pursued a distinguished professional career as a lawyer and politician. The furniture for his legal office was designed by his brother Rafael in 1918. The Masó House library contains a rich and diverse sample of the family's literary, political, and professional interests, and now remains open to researchers.

== Living room ==
The living room contains some fine pieces from the Masó House art collection. The architect's father, a solicitor, politician, and journalist, was also an amateur painter with a keen interest in contemporary Catalan painting. Outstanding works include paintings by Laureano Barrau, Modest Urgell, Joan Brull, Lluís Graner, Baldomero Gili (1873-1926), and Iu Pascual, among others.

== Inner staircase and bedrooms ==
Rafael Masó designed the furniture for the first-floor bedroom in 1924, upon the marriage of his brother, Joan. The geometric forms of the bed headboard, wardrobe, and dressing table show Masó's preference for austere refinement combined with traditional craftsmanship. To accommodate the large Masó Valentí family, the house originally contained many more bedrooms on the second floor, now occupied by the offices and exhibition rooms of the Foundation. The inner staircase, with its pronounced geometrical and vertical design, is an example of Masó's adaptations of the English Arts & Crafts interiors. on the second-floor landing there are two drawings attributed to Goya, as well as others by Marià Salvador Maella, Eugenio Lucas and Vicente López, among others.

== Bathroom ==
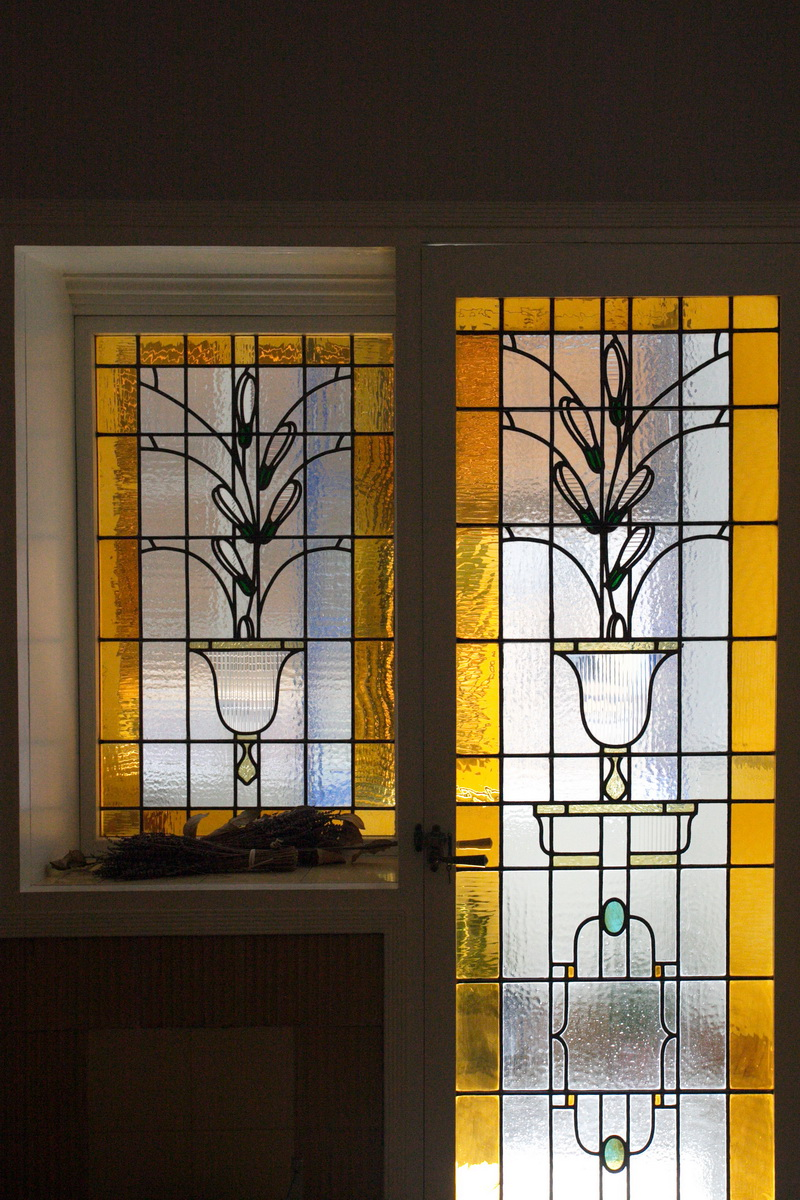
Glass door and window

The bathroom is a magnificent example of how Masó combined design with different materials in order to imprint character on his interiors. In this case, the texture and color of the ceramic tiles and mosaic floor, together with the stained glass door and window, lend notes of warmth, hygiene, and refinement to this most private of all places, hitherto the objects of scant attention in the decoration of middle-class dwellings.

== Facade overlooking the river ==
As Masó was remodeling and uniting the interiors of the four houses acquired by his family, he also unified the rear of the houses into one large facade, the largest of all those overlooking the river. He painted the facade white to set it apart from the rest of the row of houses, and distinguished it with yellow-glazed ceramic tiles, thus adding notes of color to go with the wooden blinds, the blue window frames, and the greenery in the planters.

== The Fundació Rafael Masó ==
The Foundation is a non-profit-making body set up in 2006 after the cession of the Masó House to Girona City Council by the architect's nephew and his wife, the last owners of the building. It is supported by Rafael Masó's heirs, the City Council, the Architects' Association, the Quantity Surveyors' Association, and the University of Girona.

As well as the conservation and the visitor management of Masó House, the Foundation also promotes research, conservation, and dissemination of Masó's works and of Catalan Noucentisme in general. It also organizes exhibitions, publications, and educational activities for all ages in order to build awareness of the importance of architecture and urban planning for people and the society in which they live.
