= Forn =

Forn is a Spanish surname. Notable people with the surname include:

- Ivar Andreas Forn (born 1983), Norwegian footballer
- Joaquim Forn (born 1964), Spanish Catalan politician
- Josep Maria Forn (born 1928), Spanish actor and filmmaker
- Juan Forn (1959–2021), Argentine writer and translator
- Teresa Forn (born 1959), Spanish Catalan runner

== See also ==
- Cala Forn, a painting by Joaquim Sunyer
- El Forn, a hamlet in Andorra
- Forn Sed Norge, a Norwegian heathen religious organization
