= Jaume Agelet i Garriga =

Jaume Agelet i Garriga (1888–1981) was a Catalan poet. He was born in Lleida, Catalonia, Spain and died in Madrid. He was a graduate in law. In 1920 he entered the diplomatic service and was stationed in Vienna, Mexico, Washington, The Hague and finally Paris, his main residence after 1935.

== Works ==
He was the author of diverse works, which integrated the Noucentisme movement with symbolism and neo-populism. He was also an occasional contributor to "La Revista", "La Nova Revista", "Quaderns de Poesia" (Poetry Notebooks) and "Vida Lleidetana" (Life in Lleida). As most of his works were published outside his native Catalonia, he was perhaps better known internationally than in his home country.

Many of his works were published in 1955 in "Obra poètica 1924-1955" (Poetic Works 1924-1955), which included a selection from previous collections: Domassos al Sol (Damask in the Sun, 1924), La Tarda Oberta (The Open Afternoon, 1927); Hostal de Nuvols (1931); Els Fanals del Meu Sant (The Lanterns of My Saint, 1935); Rosada i Celistia (1949); Pluges a L’erm (Rains in the Desert, 1953); and L’escalf del Graner (The Heat of the Granary, 1955).

Subsequently he published Fauna i Flora (Fauna and Flora, 1959); Fonts de Lluna (Fountains of the Moon, 1960), his most intense and melancholy book, La Gàbia de la Faula (The Cage of the Fable, 1964); Hort Well (Old Garden, 1968) and Ocells al Teulat (Birds on the Roof, 1970). In 1984 the definitive edition of his Complete Poems was published by the "Institut d’Estudis Ilerdencs".

His works have not been translated into English. (as of 2009)
