= Quaderns de poesia =

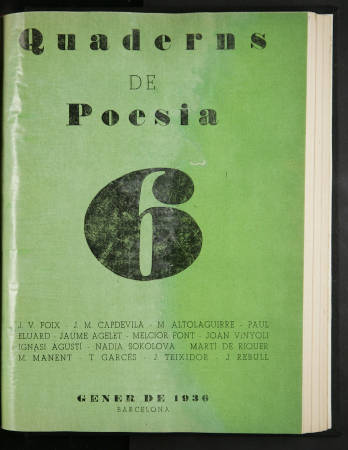
front cover of one of the numbers of "Quaderns de poesia"

Quaderns de poesia (in English Poetry Notebooks) is a poetry Catalan magazine. Its publication started in June 1935 and continued until 1936 when it had to be interrupted due to the Spanish Civil War. In total 8 volumes were published monthly. It was directed by a staff including Josep Vicenç Foix, Tomàs Garcés, Marià Manent, Carles Riba and Joan Teixidor. It was a high quality magazine regarding its presentation and its content. The magazine had 32 pages with 2 columns each and the dimensions were 240x185mm. The impression was done in Castells Bonet, S.A. and the editing office was in the Street Carrer de les Corts Catalanes 660 in Barcelona. The price was one and a half peseta.

== Theme and collaborators ==
The theme of the magazine was poetry. They were published poetry texts from poets from that period. Almost all of them were written in Catalan, but there also were some in Spanish and French. Furthermore, they published critical articles and essays about literature.

The collaborators of the magazine were Josep Carner, Carles Riba, García Lorca, Stephen Spender, Jules Supervielle, Riquer, Pedro Salinas, Josep Maria Capdevila, Marià Manent among others. Moreover, there were drawings by Francesc Domingo. The number 4 was dedicated to the poetry of Ramon Llull.

Quaderns de Poesia was one of the best recompilations of poetry from that period in Europe. In addition, they were a clear exponent of Noucentisme and the beginnings of Avant-gardism.
