= La nacionalitat catalana =

1906 book by Enric Prat de la Riba

"La nacionalitat catalana" (Catalan pronunciation: [lə nəsi.unəliˈtat kətəˈlanə], in English "The Catalan nationality") is an essay and political manifesto written by the Conservative politician Enric Prat de la Riba in 1906. Focusing on the will for the restoration of self-government in the region, it is one of the foundational text of Noucentisme and modern political Catalanism and a philosophical justification of Catalan nationalism.

The author portrays the years spanning between the abolition of the privileges and traditional institutions of Catalonia as part of the introduction of French centralism by the first Bourbon king of Spain, Philip V, and the present moment, as a period of cultural renaissance among those who struggled against the unification and centralisation of Spain (as exemplified by the Romanticist movement La Renaixença) and were aware of its nationality.
