= Enric Prat de la Riba =

Catalan politician (1870–1917)

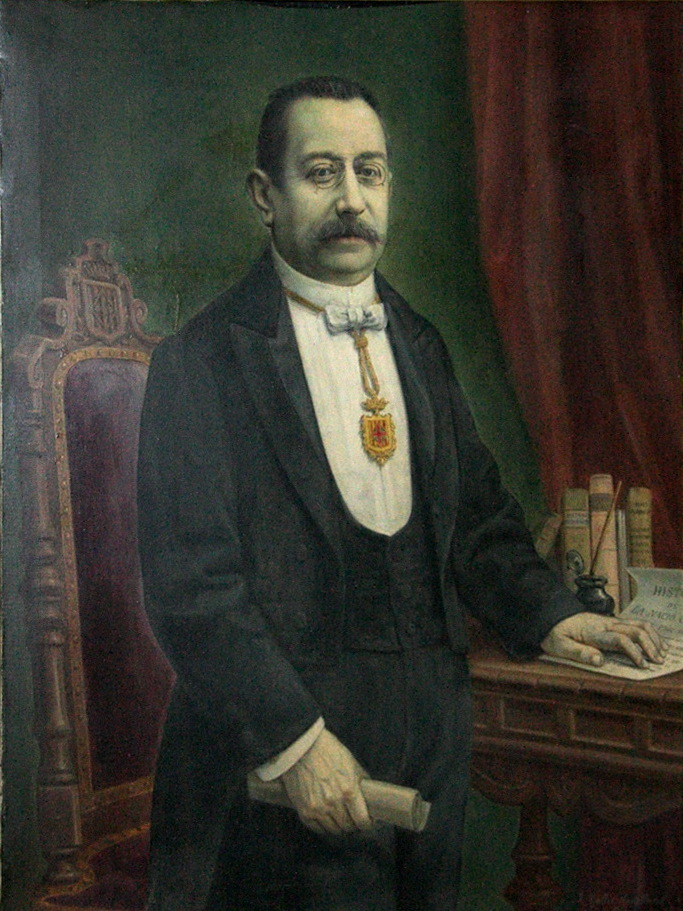

President of Barcelona Provincial Council
- In office 2 April 1907 – 6 April 1914
- Preceded by: Joaquim Sostres i Rey
- Succeeded by: Joan Vallès i Pujals

President of the Commonwealth of Catalonia
- In office 6 April 1914 – 1 August 1917
- Preceded by: New office
- Succeeded by: Josep Puig i Cadafalch

Personal details
- Born: Enric Prat de la Riba i Sarrà; 29 November 1870 Castellterçol, Barcelona
- Died: 1 August 1917 (aged 46) Castellterçol, Barcelona
- Party: Regionalist League of Catalonia (Catalan: Lliga Regionalista)
- Education: University of Barcelona; Complutense University of Madrid
- Occupation: Lawyer, writer, journalist

Enric Prat de la Riba i Sarrà (Catalan pronunciation: [ənˈrik ˈpɾad də lə ˈriβə]; 29 November 1870 – 1 August 1917) was a Spanish politician, lawyer and writer. He was a member of the Centre Escolar Catalanista, where one of the earliest definitions of Catalan nationalism was formulated. He became the first President of the Commonwealth of Catalonia on 6 April 1914 and retained this office until his death. He wrote the book and political manifesto La nacionalitat catalana in which greater autonomy to Catalonia was advocated. He was one of the main architects of the resurgence of Catalan national consciousness in the 19th century. He also took part in the drafting and approval of the Bases de Manresa, a foundational document of Catalan regionalist politics that laid out a proposed framework for self-government in Catalonia in 1892. He died in 1917 and is interred in the Montjuïc Cemetery in Barcelona.

== Early life ==
He was born into a family of rural landowners originally from Can Prat de la Riba, in Bigues. His parents were Esteve Prat de la Riba i Magarins and Maria Sarrà i Rosàs. He was the fifth child of the couple, whose children were Valentí, Rosa, Antònia, Ramon, Enric, Joaquim, and Josep.

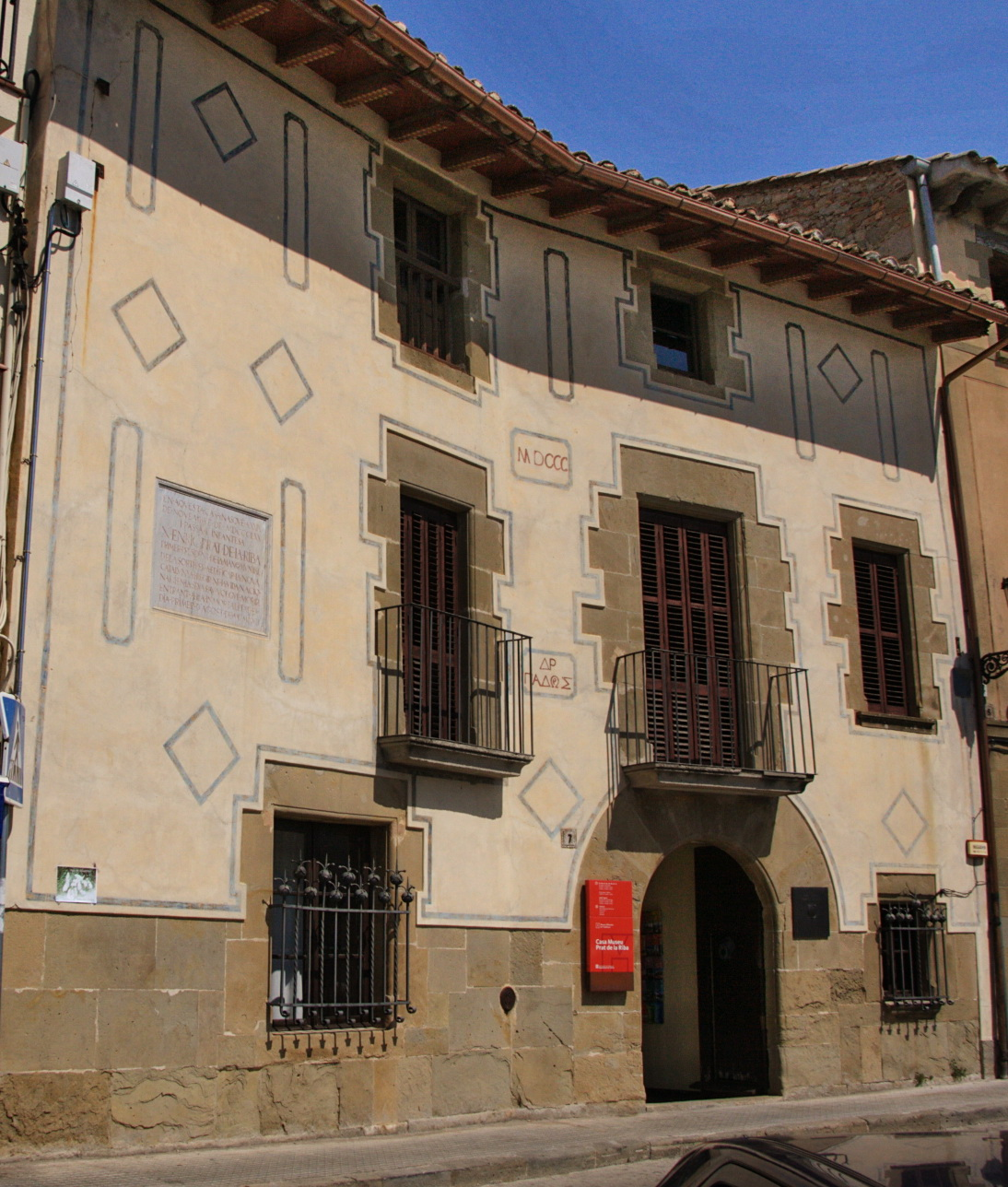
Birthplace of Prat de la Riba in Castellterçol

Enric Prat de la Riba i Sarrà was born on 29 November 1870 in Castellterçol, to an affluent Roman Catholic conservative family. He started his law studies at the University of Barcelona and finished and received his degree at the Central University of Madrid.

== Political career ==
Prat de la Riba was attracted towards Catalan nationalism when he was still in college. In 1887, he became a member of Centre Escolar Catalanista. He became an important member of the cultural and political organization Unió Catalanista, in which he wrote some of its most relevant manifestos, among them is the famous Missatge al Rei dels Hel·lens in 1897. In 1891, he was elected the secretary of Unió. He penned Catalan nationalist writings such as Compendi de la doctrina catalanista and Compendi de la història de Catalunya. He also wrote for the periodical La Renaixença. Since 1899, he promoted Catalan nationalism in politics, at first as a member of the Centre Nacional Català and later in the Regionalist League of Catalonia. The Regionalist League was a right-wing Catalan political party established in 1901 by Prat de la Riba. The party demanded greater administrative autonomy to Catalonia.

Prat de la Riba served as a secretary of the assembly in charge of writing the draft for a regional constitution known as Bases de Manresa in 1892, the first step towards the development of the Catalan Statute of Autonomy. He is also known as the author of the Noucentista Catalan nationalist manifesto La nacionalitat catalana in 1906.

Later on, in 1907 he became the first president of the Institut d'Estudis Catalans, president of the Diputació de Barcelona and a proponent of the Commonwealth of Catalonia, which he led until his death on 6 April 1914, having served as its first President of the Commonwealth.

=== Imprisonment ===
In 1902, following an article published in La Veu de Catalunya titled Separatism in Roussillon, which was a literal copy of what had been published in the Perpignan newspaper L'Indépendant, legal proceedings were opened against the newspaper. On 2 April, his provisional imprisonment was decreed, which lasted only a few days before he was placed under house arrest. After the coronation of Alfonso XIII, a general pardon was decreed, and on 23 May, by order of the military authority, he was provisionally released. Finally, on 21 June, he was officially notified of the dismissal of the case.

In 1905, he was elected member of the Barcelona Provincial Council for the second district and was re-elected for Vic-Granollers in 1909, 1913, and 1917. He was elected president of the council in 1907, re-elected in 1909, 1911, 1913, and 1917. As a defender of the provincial Commonwealth (Mancomunitat), he was elected president of the Commonwealth of Catalonia in 1914 and re-elected in 1917. He was a member of the Academy of Jurisprudence and Legislation of Barcelona and authored numerous articles published in the Revista Jurídica de Catalunya.

On 1 August 1917, he died at his birthplace in Castellterçol, probably as a consequence of Basedow's disease, which he had suffered from for years. On 3 August, a funeral procession, which received condolences from every town it passed through, transported his body to Barcelona. In Barcelona, a large procession was organized to accompany the coffin, which was finally buried at the Montjuïc Cemetery on 4 August.

== Political work ==
In 1887, he joined the Centre Escolar Catalanista, from which one of the first definitions of Catalanism emerged. In 1890, he was elected president and in his presidential speech he stated:

"I come to speak to you about the Catalan homeland, which, small or large, is our only homeland [...]"

— Enric Prat de la Riba, Presidential speech at the Centre Escolar Catalanista, 1890

In 1892, he was secretary of the assembly that drafted the Bases de Manresa, a document that set the foundations for the restoration of the Catalan constitutions.

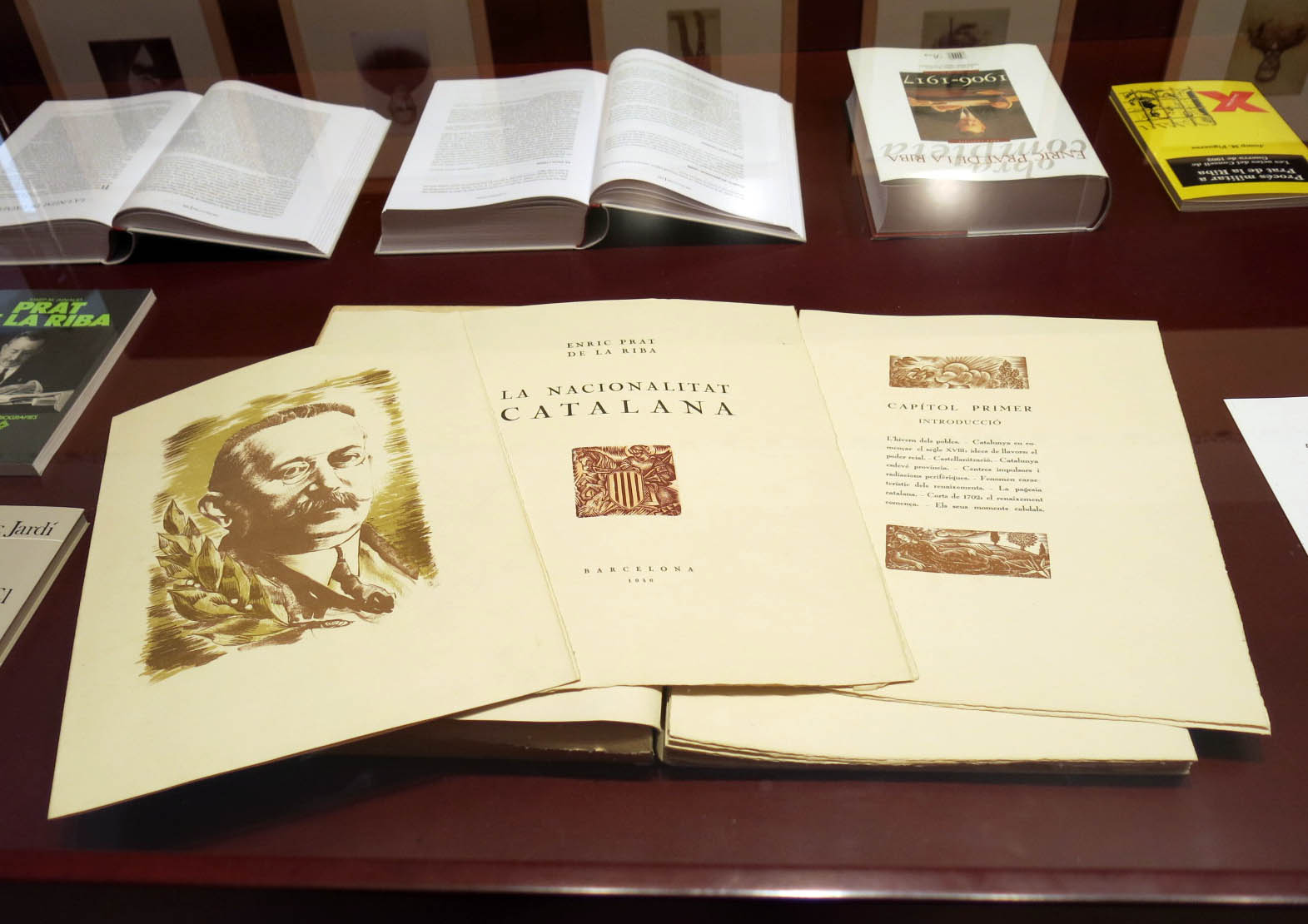
Copy of La nacionalitat catalana exhibited at the Casa Prat de la Riba in Castellterçol

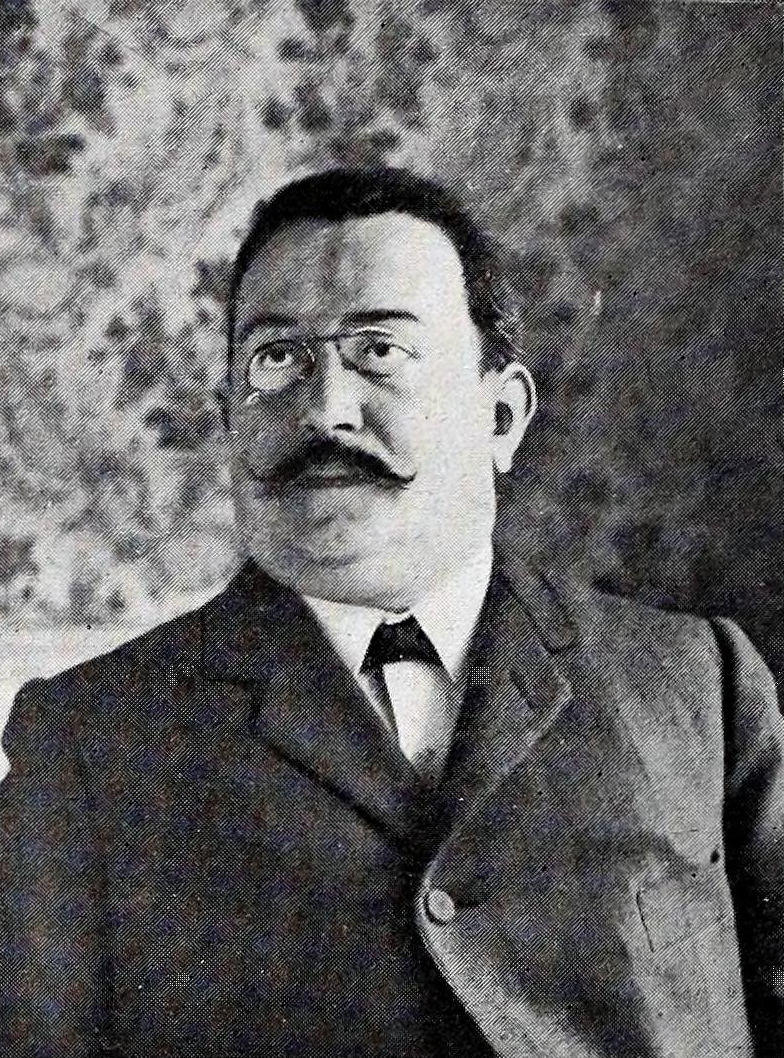
Prat de la Riba in 1908

A defender of Catalan law, he was also a defender of the Catalan language. He held several leadership positions within the Unió Catalanista. As a mobilizer of Catalanist consciousness, he drafted manifestos for the Union, among which stands out the Message to the King of the Hellenes in 1897, for which he was prosecuted.

Likewise, as a disseminator and Catalanist thinker, he wrote Compendi de la doctrina catalanista (with Pere Muntanyola i Carner), Compendi de la Història de Catalunya, and promoted the newspaper La Renaixença. He actively cooperated in the Jocs Florals movement and participated in the First International Congress of the Catalan Language in 1906.

From 1899, he promoted a Catalanist political current, first at the Centre Nacional Català and later at the Lliga Regionalista. He is also the author of the seminal work La nacionalitat catalana, written in 1906. He supported the participation of the Lliga in Spanish politics; an example is the drafting of the manifestos Per Catalunya i per l'Espanya Gran (1916) and El ahorro propio de los catalanes (1916). With the outbreak of World War I, he took a moderate position in favor of Germany.

== Institutional work ==
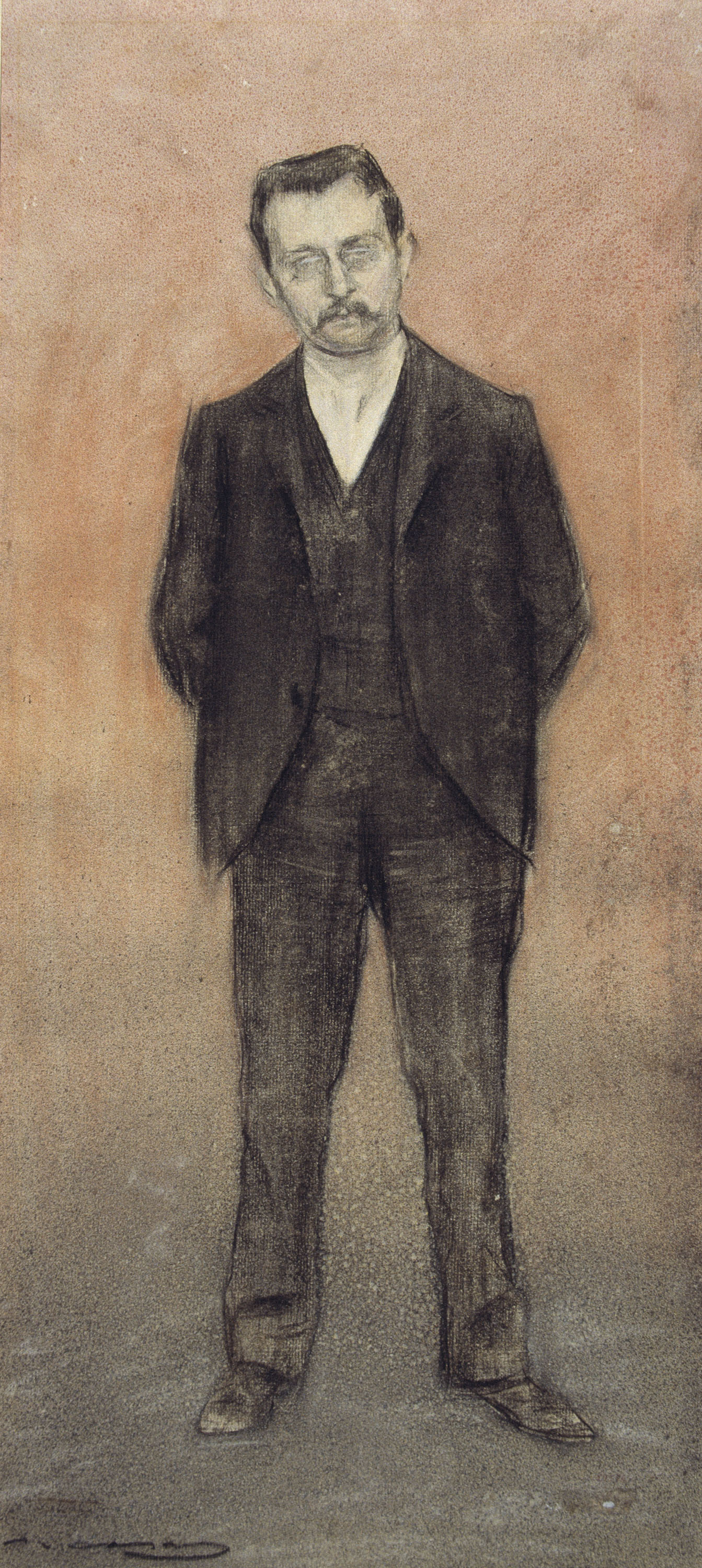
Enric Prat de la Riba portrayed by Ramon Casas (at the MNAC)

Prat de la Riba was president of the Diputació de Barcelona (Barcelona Provincial Council) from 1907 to 1914. As such, on 18 June 1907, he founded the Institut d'Estudis Catalans (Institute of Catalan Studies), based on a proposal that arose during the First International Congress of the Catalan Language. He promoted the creation of the Mancomunitat de Catalunya (Commonwealth of Catalonia), becoming its first president on 6 April 1914, a position he held until his death.

Prat de la Riba managed to unite various efforts and initiatives: although the project was promoted by the Lliga Regionalista, without the support of left-wing republican Catalanism and Catalans from the Spanish dynastic parties, unanimity would not have been achieved. This consensus led the Government of Spain at the end of 1913 to approve a royal decree authorizing provincial councils to federate exclusively for administrative purposes.

In his inaugural speech after being elected president of the Assembly of the Commonwealth of Catalonia on 6 April 1914 in Barcelona, Prat de la Riba emphasized the importance of the achievement: "The Commonwealth closes a period that begins with the fall of Barcelona, with the Nueva Planta decrees […] and initiates another, which is tomorrow […]", recalling that Catalonia had lost self-government two hundred years earlier.

In the linguistic field, Prat de la Riba called for unity and discipline among Catalans regarding the Normes ortogràfiques (Orthographic Norms), and consequently, local corporations adopted the new orthography.

== Major achievements ==
- Institut d'Estudis Catalans (Institute of Catalan Studies), 1907
- Definitive revitalization of the Escola Industrial (Industrial School), 1907
- Escola d'Administració Pública de Catalunya (School of Public Administration of Catalonia), 1912
- Biblioteca de Catalunya (Library of Catalonia), 1914; Escola Superior de Bibliotecàries (Higher School of Librarians), 1915; and, more broadly, promotion of the network of libraries across Catalonia
- Mancomunitat de Catalunya (Commonwealth of Catalonia), 1917

== Publications ==
- Prat de la Riba, Enric (2007). La nacionalitat catalana. Barcelona: Escola d'Administració Pública de Catalunya. p. 132. ISBN 978-84-393-7425-1.
- Prat de la Riba, Enric (2008). Per la llengua catalana. Barcelona: Escola d'Administració Pública de Catalunya. p. 88. ISBN 978-84-393-7425-1.

== Personal archive ==
His personal archive is preserved at the Arxiu Nacional de Catalunya. The archive contains the documents produced and received by Enric Prat de la Riba, particularly those created through his professional activity, whether legal, literary, or journalistic (including legal studies, literary criticism, and press articles). It also includes documents related to his political and associative activity linked to the Centre Escolar Catalanista, the Unió Catalanista, the Lliga Regionalista, the Provincial Council, and the Mancomunitat de Catalunya (including speeches, lectures, proclamations, manifestos), as well as correspondence (with original letters received from numerous political and cultural figures of the time).

The archive also preserves personal and family documentation (such as memoirs, diaries, agendas, family correspondence, etc.), and documents about the creator of the archive (monographs and articles).

The Biblioteca de Catalunya, whose creation he promoted, conserves his personal library, a collection of 1,811 books bequeathed by his widow.

== See also ==
- Gaietà Soler i Perejoan

== Bibliography ==
- Grau, Josep (2006). La Lliga Regionalista i la llengua catalana, 1901–1924. Barcelona: Abadia de Montserrat. ISBN 9788484157687.
- Escola d'Administració Pública de Catalunya, 2017. Commemorative infographic for the centenary of Enric Prat de la Riba's death. Various languages: Catalan · Occitan · English · French · Spanish [Accessed: 5 December 2017].
- Grau Mateu, Josep. "L'ús del català a la Mancomunitat de Catalunya", *Revista de Llengua i Dret*, 2014.
- Jardí, Enric. El pensament de Prat de la Riba. Barcelona: Alpha (1983). ISBN 84-7225-231-0
- Ollé i Romeu, Josep Maria (1995). Homes del catalanisme. Bases de Manresa. Diccionari biogràfic. (1st ed., pp. 197–200). Barcelona: Rafael Dalmau, Editor. ISBN 84-232-0484-7
- Penarroja, Jordi; Cotrina, Ramon; Jerez, Fermín. Prat de la Riba, reconstructor de la nacionalitat. (Col·lecció Personatges catalans de tots els temps). Barcelona: Editorial Blume, 1980, 94 pp. ISBN 84-7031-257-X
- Poblet, Josep M. (1970). "Monografia sobre Prat de la Riba en el centenari del seu naixement" (PDF). Nadales. Fundació Carulla.
- Santamaria Balaguer, Francesc Xavier (2010). Prat de la Riba i la institucionalització d'un model de cultura catalana: l'obra cultural i pedagògica (Thesis). Barcelona: Universitat Ramon Llull.
- Vallès, Josep (2010). Enric Prat de la Riba. Barcelona: Escola d'Administració Pública de Catalunya. ISBN 978-84-393-8309-3.

| Preceded by | Acadèmia de Bones Lletres de Barcelona Medal II Elected | Succeeded by |
|---|---|---|
| Manuel Duran i Bas | | Ignasi Casanovas i Camprubí SJ |
