= Rafael Masó i Valentí =

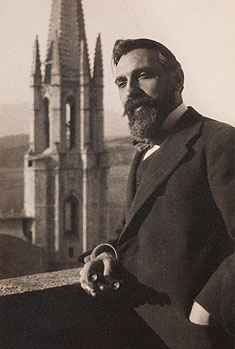
- Portrait of Rafael Maso with the church of Sant Feliu behind
- Born: 16 August 1880; Girona, Catalonia, Spain
- Died: 13 July 1935 (aged 54); Girona, Catalonia, Spain
- Occupation: Architect
- Buildings: Farinera Teixidor, Casa Batlle, Casa Salieti, Casa Masó
- Projects: Ciutat-jardí de S’Agaró

Rafael Masó i Valentí (Catalan pronunciation: [rəf(ə)ˈɛl məˈzo]; 1880–1935) was one of the most outstanding Catalan architects of the early 20th century. Masó was born in Girona into a refined, conservative, Catholic family of Catalanist ideology. The personality and professional career of the future architect were marked by the cultured atmosphere of his home, created by his father's literary and artistic interests, as well as his own love of Girona city and its traditions. Masó was an admirer of Antoni Gaudí but, as a student in Barcelona, he joined the group of artists and writers who were to forge Noucentisme, the movement that developed as an alternative to Modernisme. The civic spirit, the Catalanist outlook, and the forward-looking, pro-European ideas prevailing within the new movement inspired the young Masó, who was also to become a distinguished poet, urban planner, politician, and promoter of art and literature.

== Biography and works ==
Rafael Masó lived in the Masó House until 1912, the year of his marriage to Esperança Bru. The bulk of his work was carried out in Girona, and his buildings are mainly in the city and the surrounding area. He designed houses, villas and apartment blocks, as well as many other types of buildings, ranging from schools and hospitals to shops and factories. He was also involved in renovating farmhouses and restoring medieval architecture. His most outstanding works include the Teixidor Flour Mill (1910), the Masó House (1911), and the Athenea cultural centre (1912), all in Girona; the Masramon House (1913) in Olot, the Casas House (1914) in Sant Feliu de Guíxols, and S’Agaró garden city (1923). Unfortunately, some of Masó’s plans never left the drawing board, as the clients did not always agree with his proposals. Moreover, after his death, certain buildings were either demolished or irreparably altered.

Rafael Masó’s work is characterized by his identification with the noucentista postulates of a modernity that did not forsake the austerity of classicism, and included forms, colors, and materials taken from the local culture, with much reliance on artisan techniques. Strongly influenced by the English Arts & Crafts movement and by the new German regionalist architecture, Masó wished to unite the tradition of vernacular architecture with new ideas on structure, ornamentation, interior decoration, and furniture design. His contribution was decisive for the introduction into Catalonia of modern concepts in housing, the updating of traditional craftsmanship, the conservation of the Catalan historic heritage, and the promotion of cultural activity.

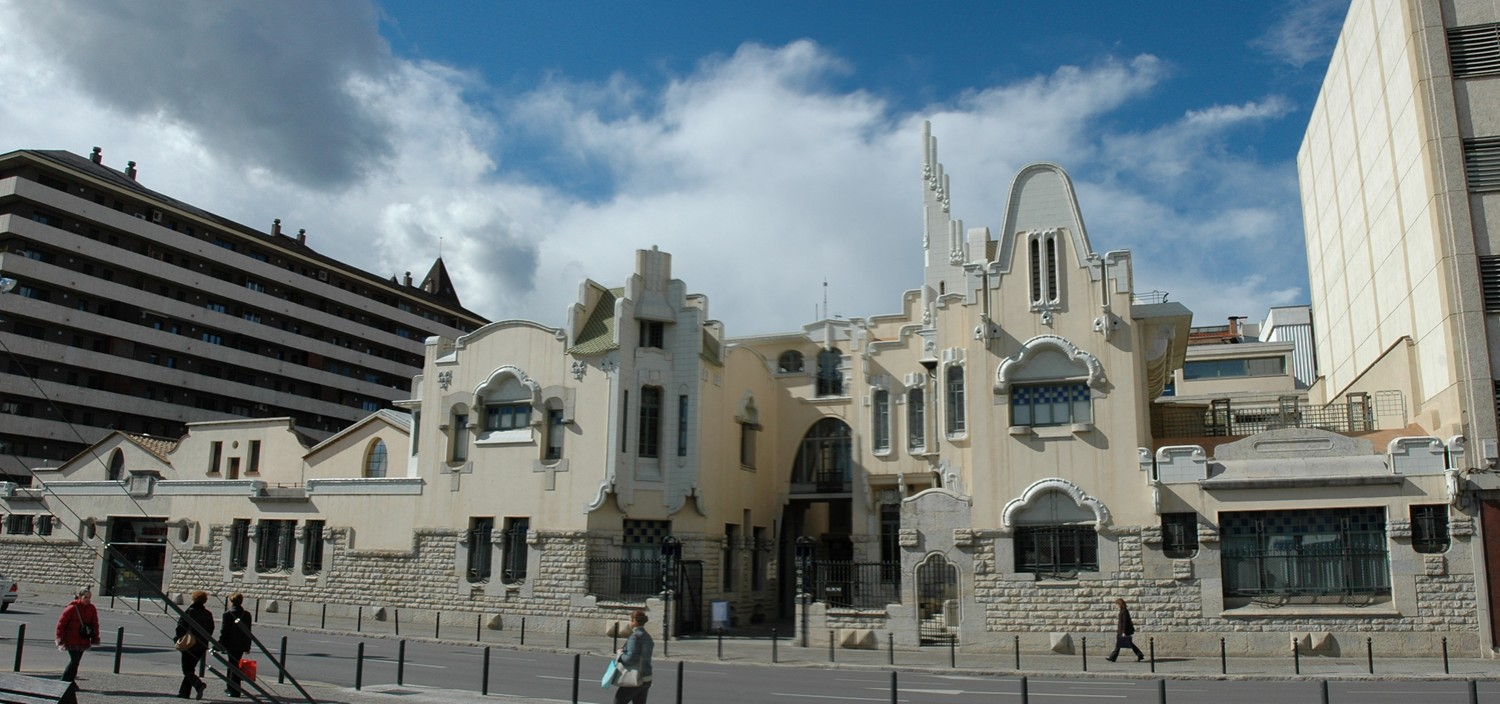
Farinera Teixidor. (Girona)

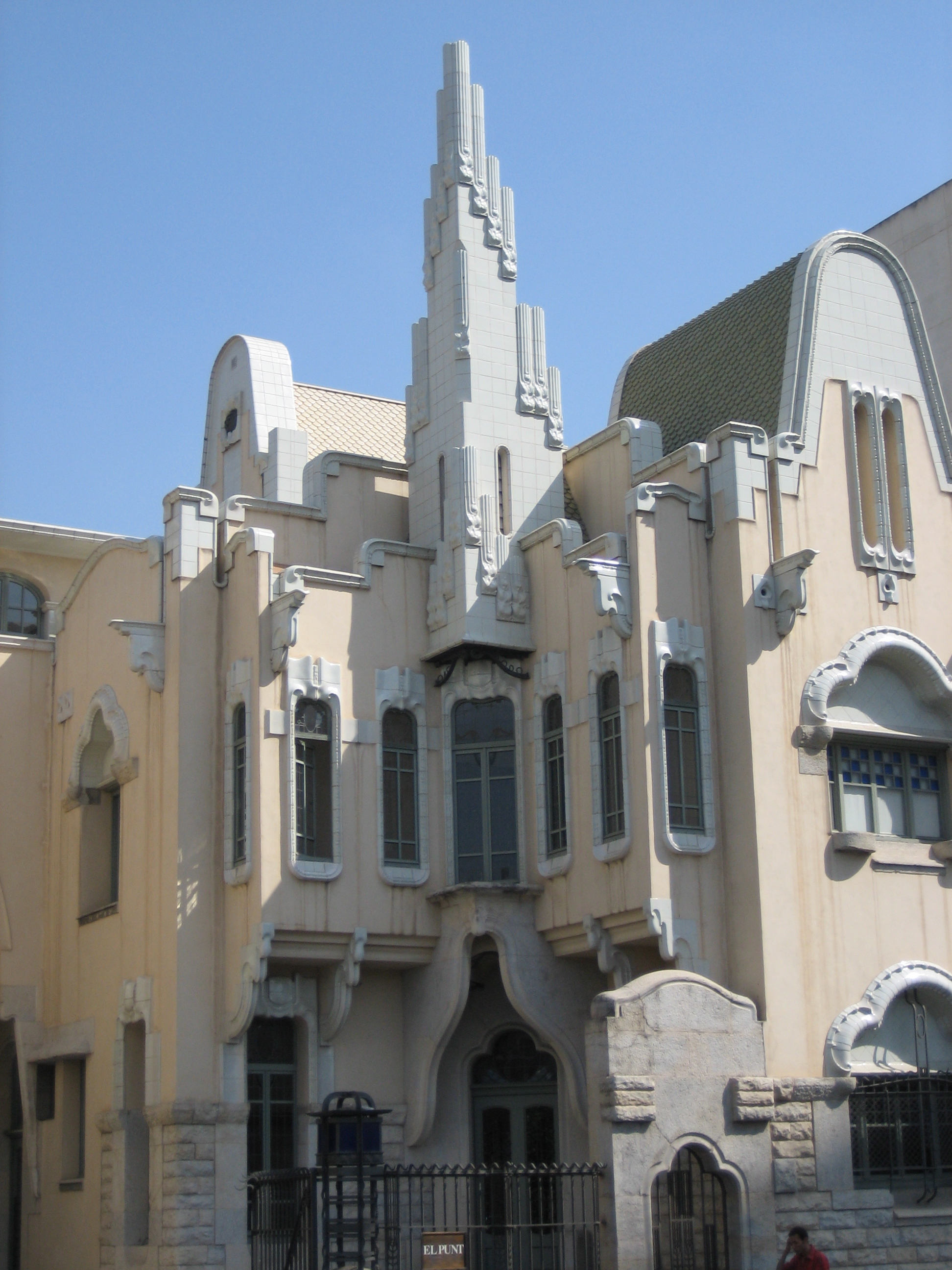
Farinera Teixidor. (Girona)

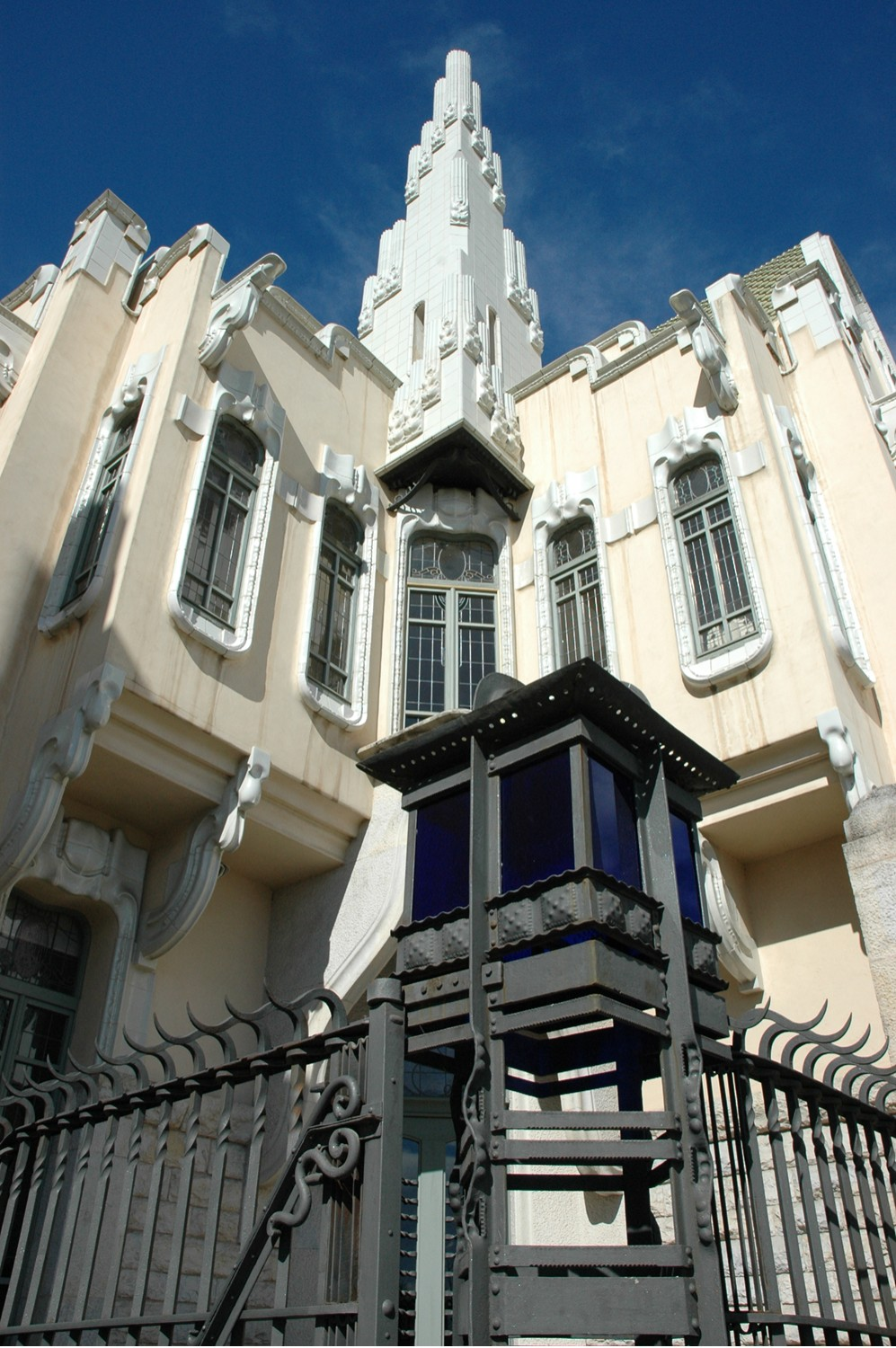
Farinera Teixidor. (Girona)

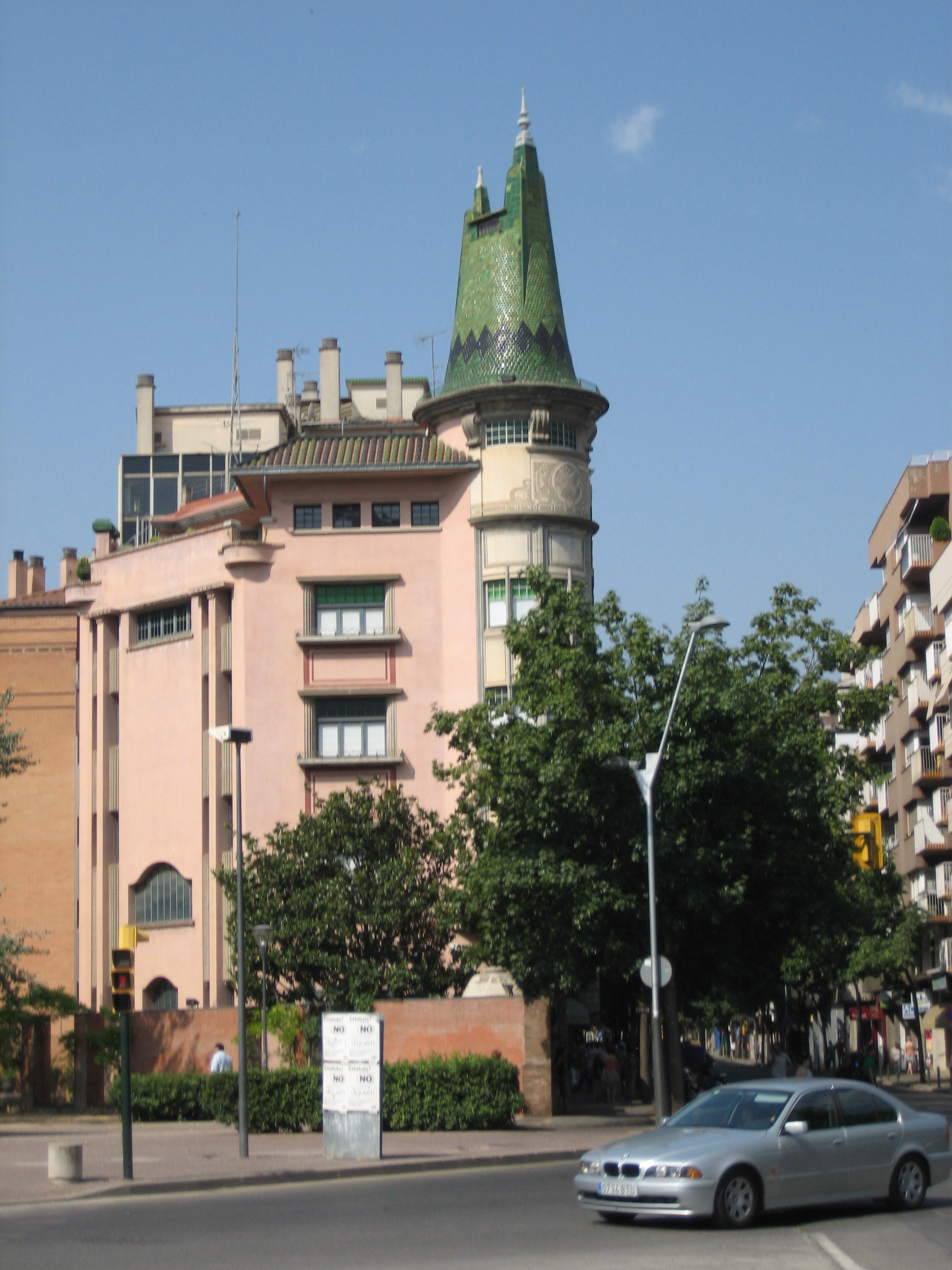
La Punxa. (Girona)

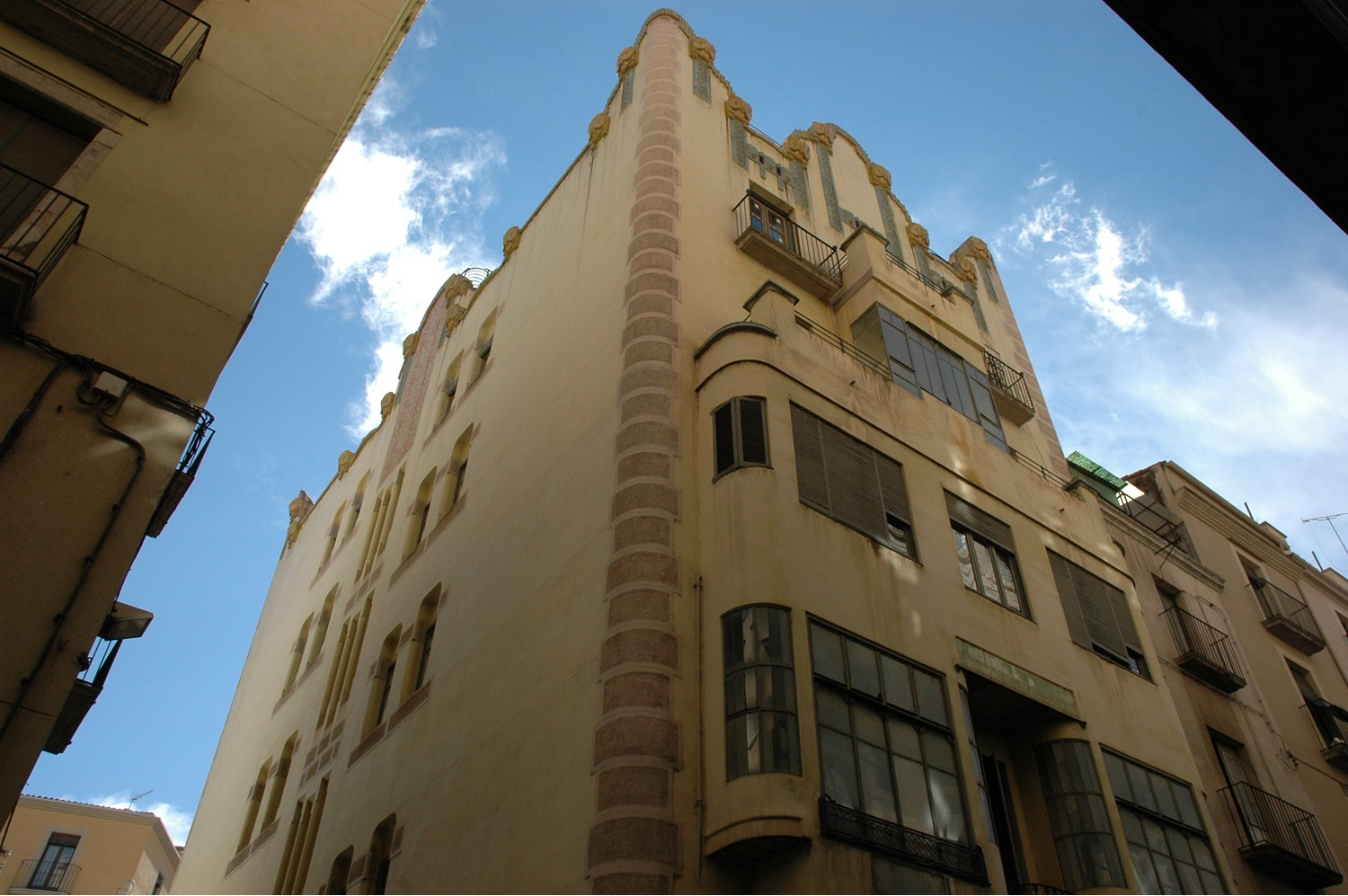
Casa Batlle. (Girona)

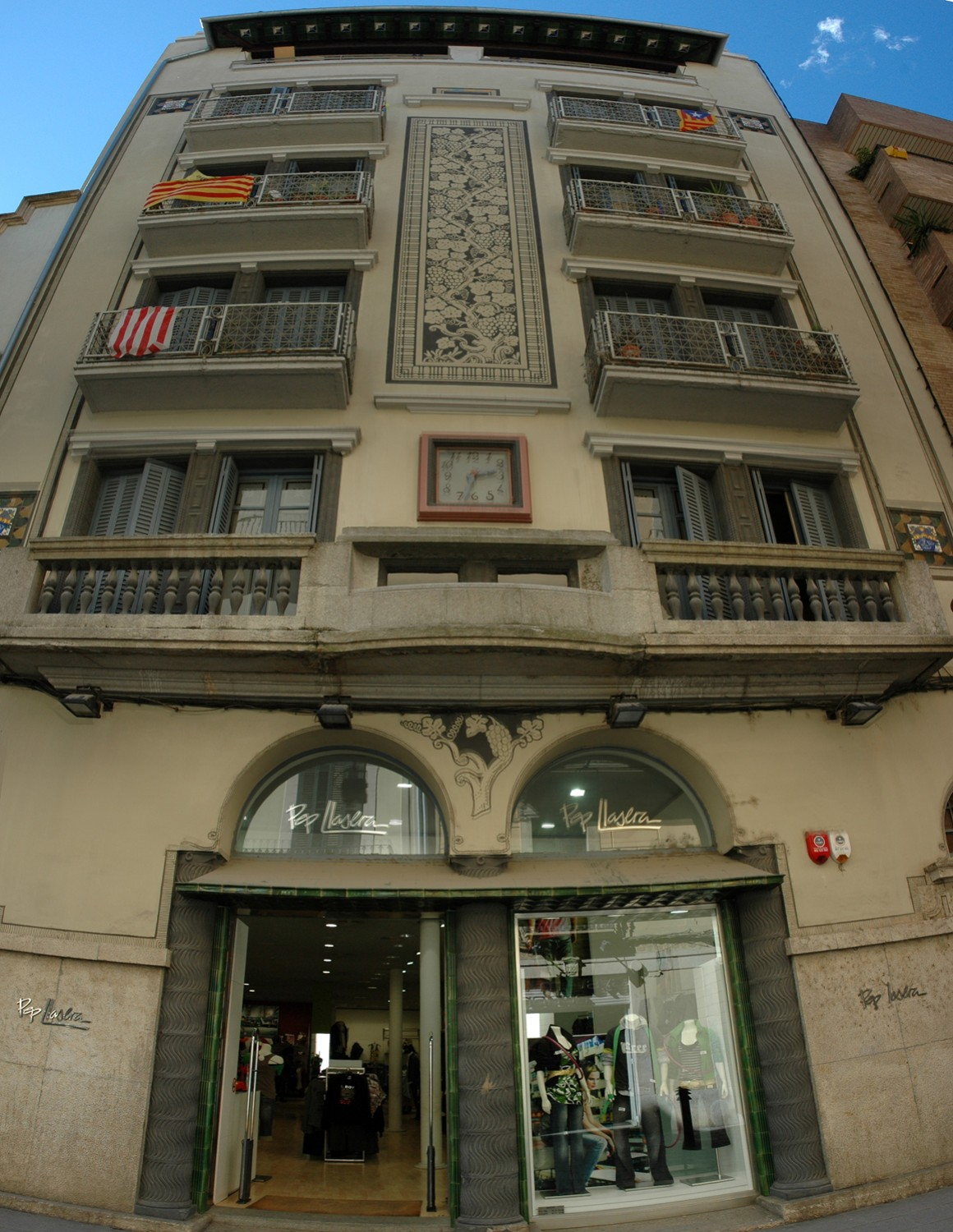
Casa Cots.(Girona)

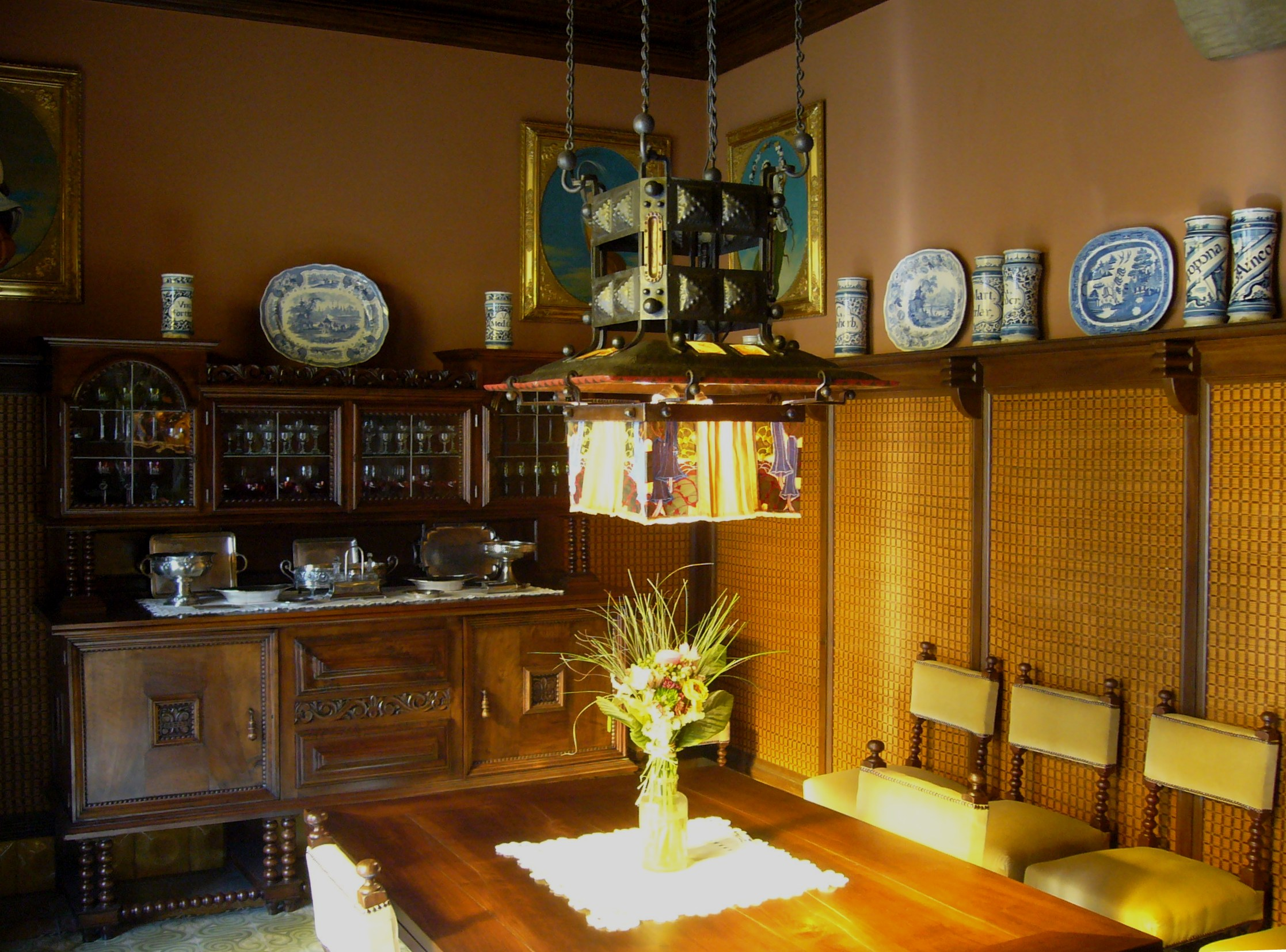
Casa Masó. (Girona)

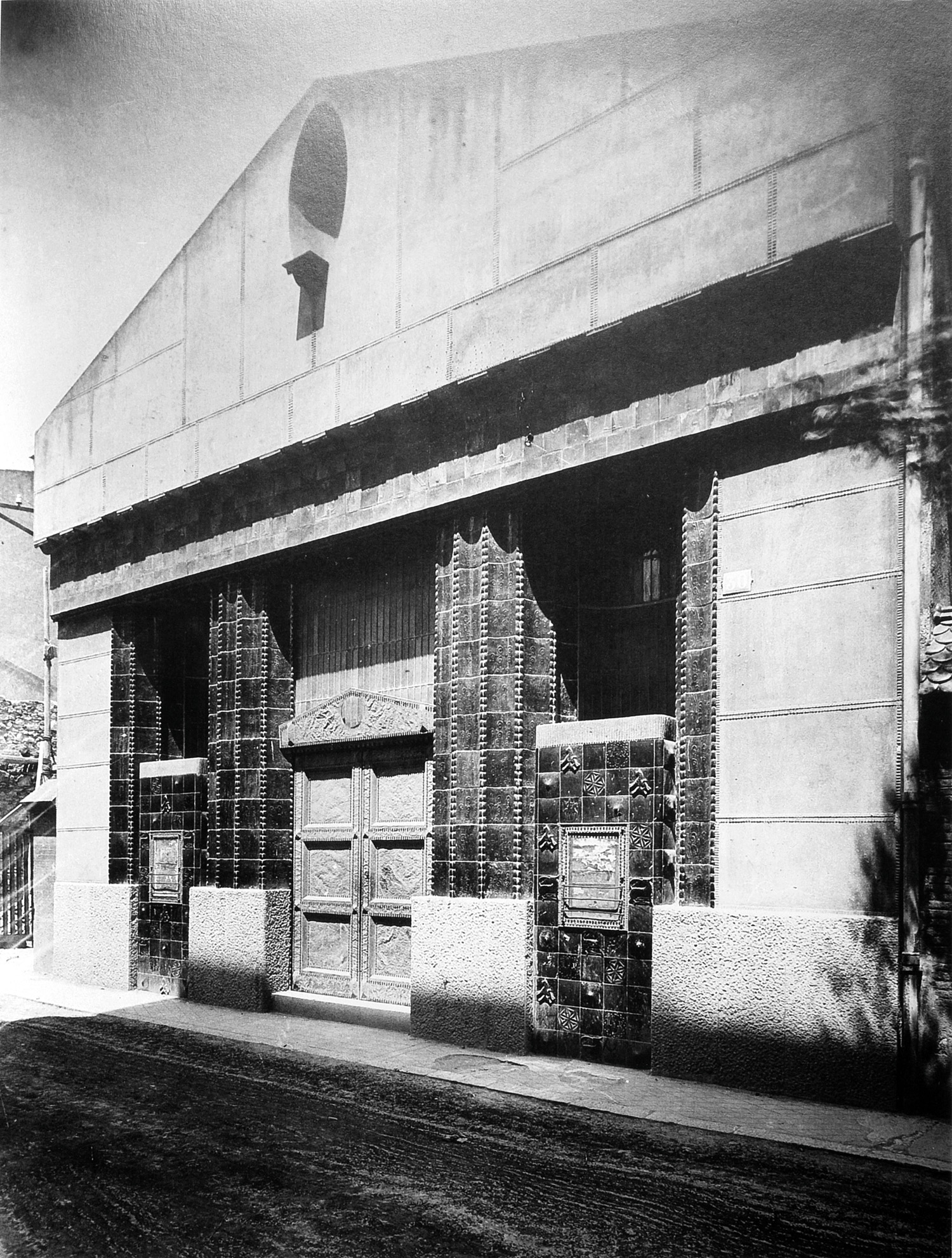
Athenea. (Girona)

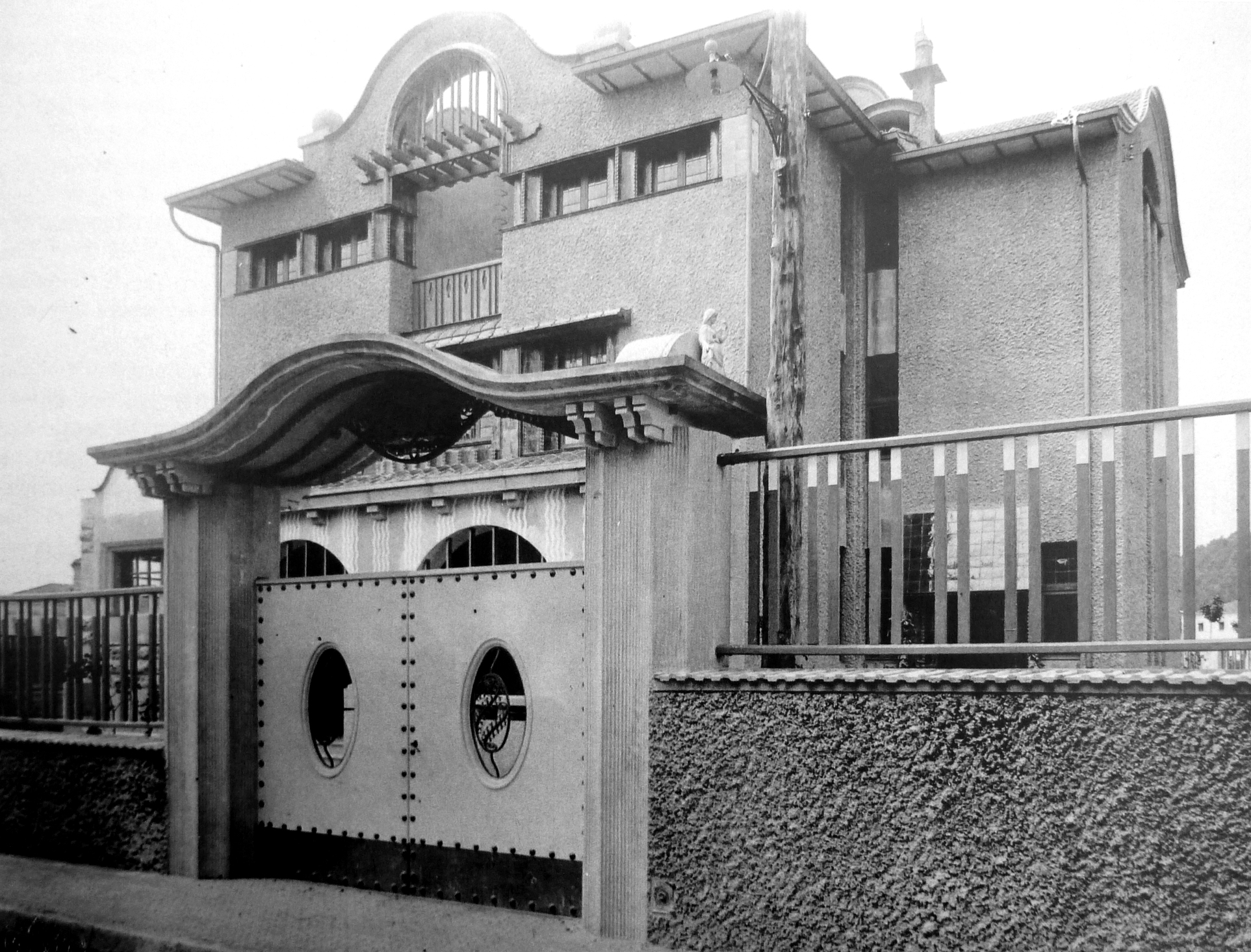
Casa Masramon. (Girona)

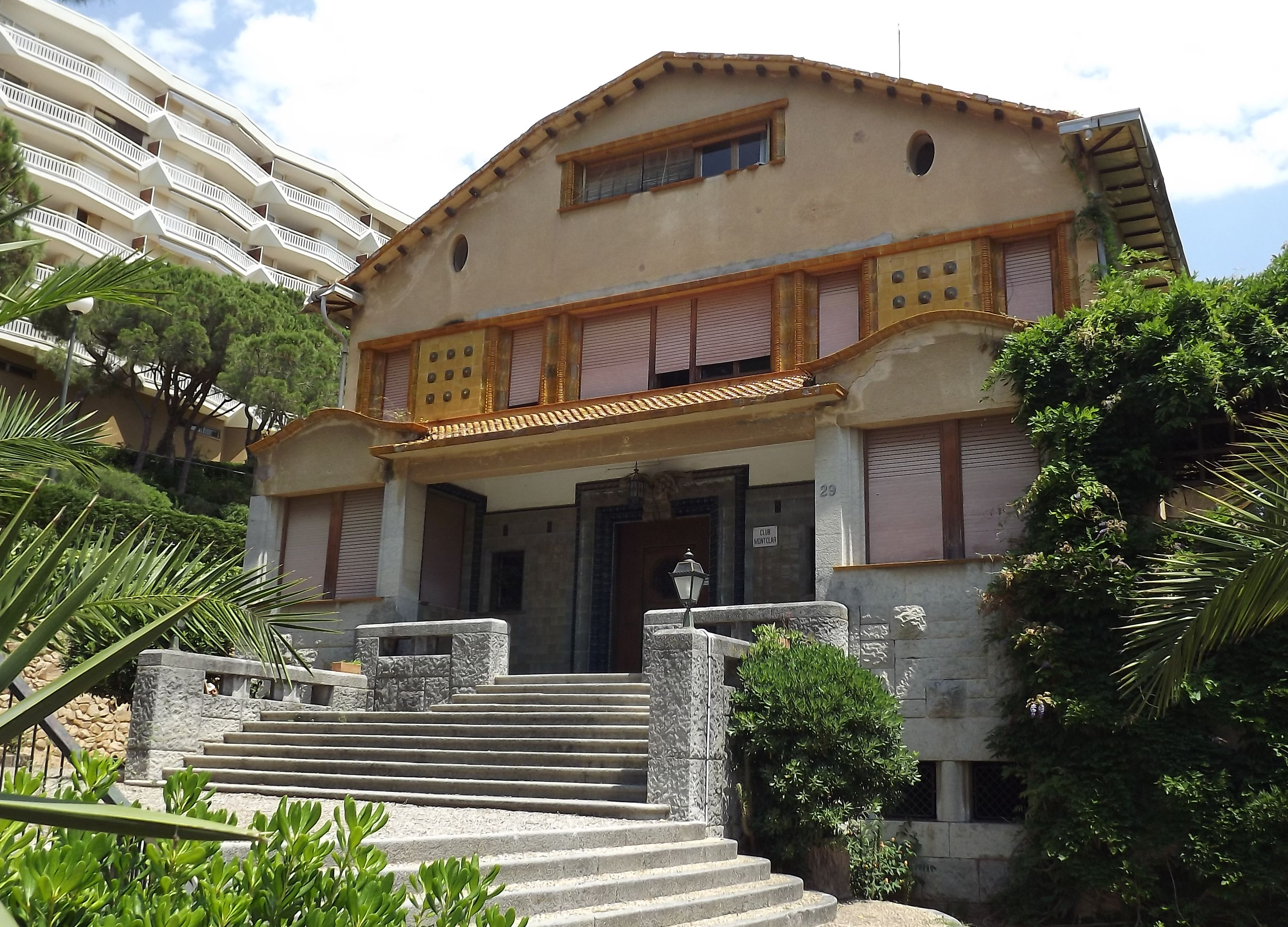
Casa Casas. (Sant Feliu de Guíxols)

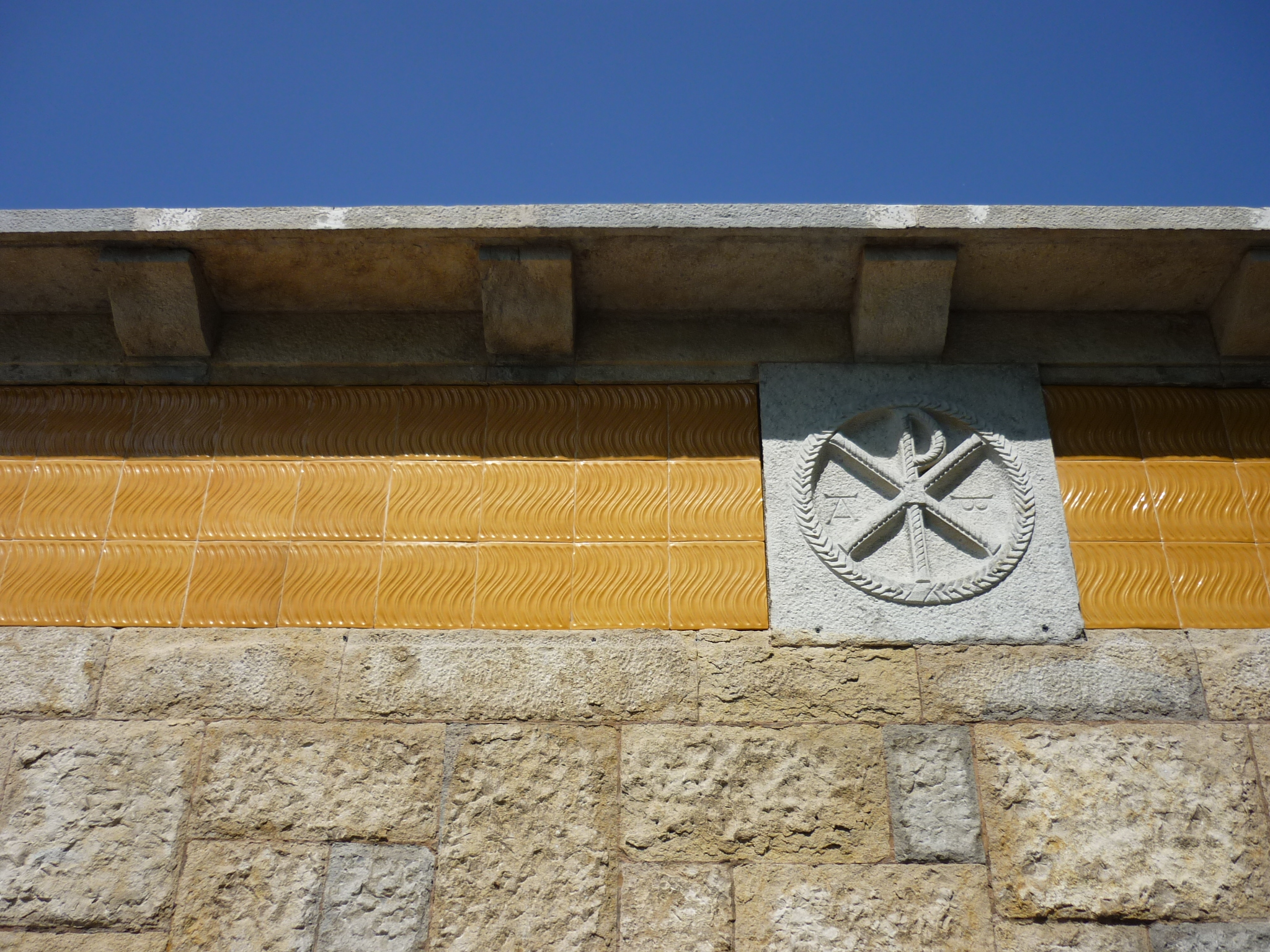
Cemetery. (Girona)

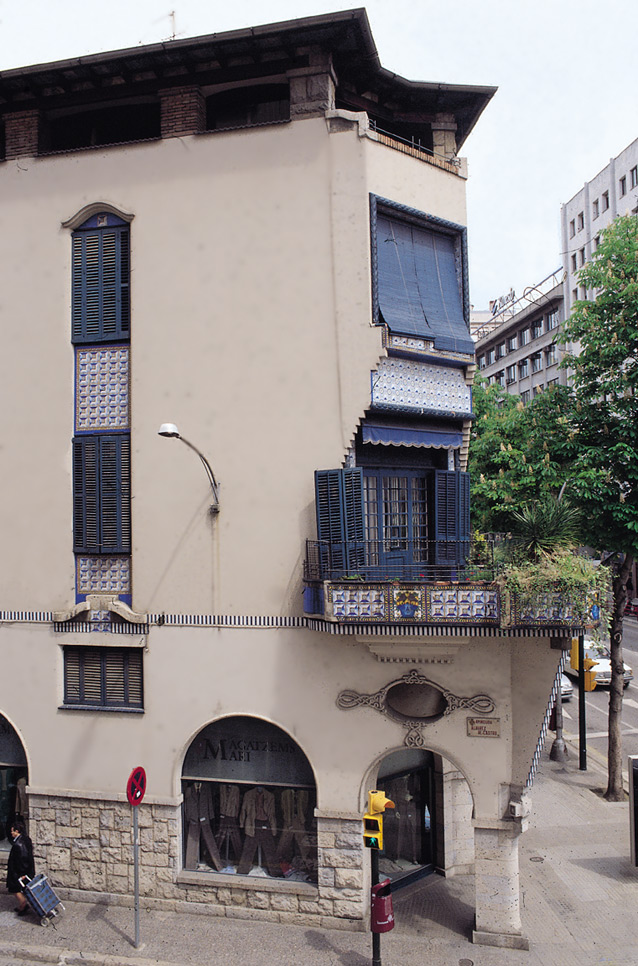
Casa Gispert-Saüch. (Girona)

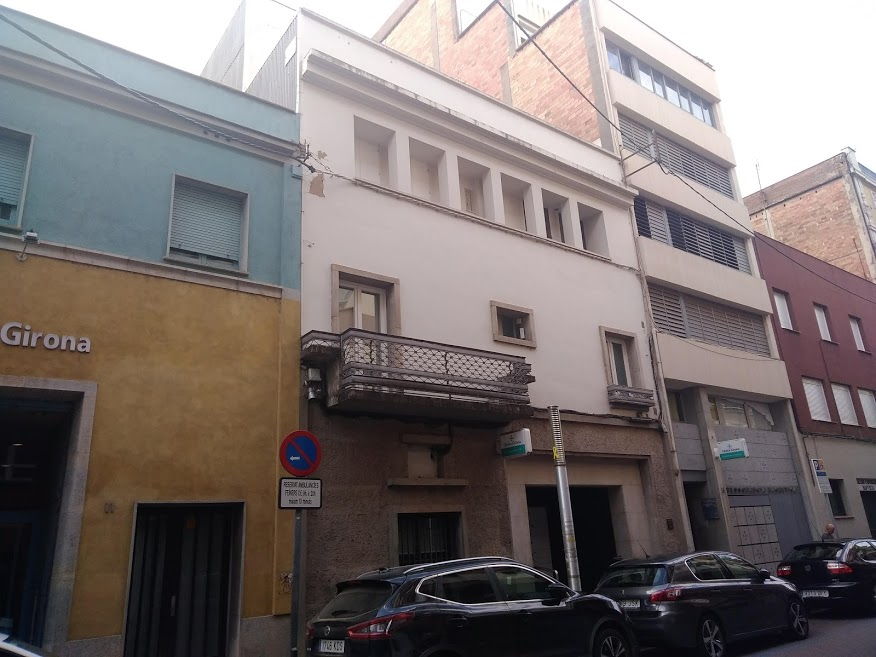
Casa Oliveras.(Girona)
