= Joaquim Sunyer =

Spanish painter

Joaquim Sunyer (Catalan pronunciation: [ʒuaˈkim suˈɲe]; 1874 in Sitges – 1956) was a Catalan painter often linked to the Noucentisme movement.

He began his artistic education with his uncle, Joaquim Mir, later moving to Barcelona where his fellow students included Joaquín Torres García, Isidre Nonell, and Joaquin Mir Trinxet. In 1896 he moved to Paris, where he became acquainted with the neo-impressionist movement and worked extensively in the style. His paintings of this period include street scenes of working-class life. He also produced graphic works influenced by Toulouse-Lautrec and Théophile Steinlen that emphasize urban night life and urban poverty. He was friends with Picasso, and in the early years of the 20th century their works were similar in style and subject.

In 1908, Sunyer turned away from Parisian subject matter in favor of the themes that would occupy him for the rest of his life, especially nudes in pastoral landscapes, family scenes, women, and children. He returned to Spain in 1911, establishing himself in his hometown of Sitges. There he painted numerous landscapes, highlighting his preoccupation with capturing Mediterranean light through the use of very light colours, marking a clear rupture with the darker paintings he had executed in Paris. His compositions are noted as an example of balance, though sacrificing technical perfection for the benefit of a more intense evocative power.

He was an important influence on younger Catalan artists such as Miró.

== Gallery ==
Landscape by Sunyer, 1913

La sandía (The Watermelon), 1920, oil on canvas, 59 x 71.5 cm, Museu Nacional d'Art de Catalunya, exhibited Exposició d'Art francès d'Avantguarda, Galeries Dalmau, Barcelona, 1920
