= Noucentisme =

Architectural movement

Noucentisme (Catalan pronunciation: [ˌnɔwsənˈtizmə], noucentista being its adjective, Spanish: novocentismo) was a Catalan cultural movement of the early 20th century that originated largely as a reaction against Modernisme, both in art and ideology, and was, simultaneously, a perception of art almost opposite to that of avantgardists. In 1906, Eugeni d'Ors coined the term following the Italian tradition of naming styles after the centuries (for example, Quattrocento, Cinquecento, etc.) and using the homonyms nou (nine) and nou (new) to suggest it was a renovation movement. The same year two essential works for Noucentisme were published: Els fruits saborosos by Josep Carner and "La nacionalitat catalana" by the Conservative politician Enric Prat de la Riba.

== In the arts ==
Despite certain similarities between the movements, it opposed Modernisme, the previous movement, and the radical and individualist views and Bohemian lifestyle most of its proponents engaged in. Noucentisme glorified order and what they saw as the spirit of the 20th century and an idealist expectancy of change. The novel was largely excluded in favour of poetry, which was more useful to convey the spirit of the style. The style as a whole shows a predilection for a Classicist approach, Europeanism, Modernism and a struggle to perfect the literary style of language. Artists and politicians were close collaborators.

Its main defining features in poetry are a return to Apollonian classicism, a very refined and accurate language, objectivity and rejection of abrupt feelings and a particular interest in nature. Its stylistical origins in the tradition started by Josep Torras i Bages, the Escola Mallorquina ("Majorcan School") led by the poets Joan Alcover and Miquel Costa i Llobera, the French Parnassian poetry and the Symbolists are obvious in most of the works produced in the period that spans from 1906 to approximately 1923. The Vienna Secession was a key influence to their ideal of beauty in architecture. The architect Rafael Masó i Valentí (1880-1935), works mainly in Girona and its regions, is one of the clearest promoters of nineteenth-century architecture. The architects of the first period, as Josep Maria Pericas mix and nineteenth-century modernist elements, especially in civil engineering.

Its most prominent adherent, Josep Carner, known by his epithet of "prince of the Catalan poets" and produced very elaborate, ornate poetry, reminiscent of the Baroque and still admired for his beautiful style and refined language.

In the following decades, though, the name of the movement has acquired a negative connotation of an excessively affected and artificial literature, just the opposite of Moderniste Joan Maragall's Romantic theory of "the living word", that is, spontaneity in creation.

Painters and sculptors of the Noucentista period are Joaquim Sunyer, Joaquín Torres-García and Manolo Hugué (who was a close friend of Picasso).

== In politics ==
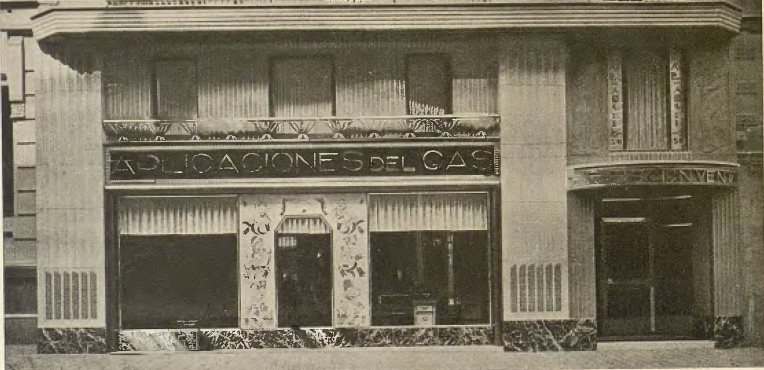
"Aplicaciones del Gas" store in Barcelona by Santiago Marco (1930)

Catalonia was the most industrialised and therefore wealthiest region of Spain at the time. A change of attitude towards politics among members of Catalan bourgeoisie helped develop the basis of political pragmatism and idealism in Noucentisme. Catalan nationalism was becoming seriously influential in politics for the first time, especially incarned in the right-wing and Catholic party Regionalist League, whose goal, despite having a full national conscience, was to achieve a number of reforms to reassure the hegemony of the Catalan principate within Spain and to become more influential in the decision-making in Spanish politics, instead of achieving formal independence.

Following the disagreements that took place among Catalan politicians, intellectuals and, most prominently, the working class of Barcelona (after the "disaster" of 1898 and the Rif War, especially after what has come to be known as Setmana Tràgica or Tragic Week in 1909), a segment of the population wished to disengage from Spain. The Catalan nationalist tradition in the 19th century had relied on protectionist views held by both the bourgeoisie and the working classes. On the other hand, an anti-liberal and reactionary Carlism that reclaimed its ancient rights and privileges still existed in the countryside and helped give birth, through Vigatanisme, to the emerging right-wing Catalanism. These new Noucentista views had partly assimilated and inherited these ideals, but were in favour of more modern values that represented their faith in (most probably far-fetched) idealist changes. A majority of members of the industrial bourgeoisie of the country supported the Regionalist League, which became the most influential party until about 1925.

Now that they had been given the chance, intellectuals of Noucentisme (itself a vehicle of this conservative, Catholic Catalanism), led by Eugenio d'Ors, advocated a project of cultural intervention based on four principles: Imperialism, Arbitrarism, Civility, and Classicism.

Noucentista imperialism was a conservative and up-to-date version of the principles of Spanish Regenerationism designed to make Catalonia the leading region of modernization of the Spanish state and society.

Arbitrarism was a philosophy naming literary creation a symbol of human will conquering reality. Their particular will could be summed up as an "ideal Catalonia" that would come to replace the "real Catalonia" through the remaining two precepts, Civility and Classicism.

Their concept of civility was rooted in a vision of an "ideal Catalonia" equalled to that of a Catalan polis ruled on the principles of culture, harmony, a democratic community life and order versus what they saw as the barbaric countryside.

Their interest in an Apollonian Classicism was not only of a literary nature: they desired formal perfection, harmony and flawless proportion to be everywhere. Mediterraneity came to be seen as a synthesis of the Noucentista ideal.

Their intervention in practice was carried out following three goals:

- A reform of the country based on their ideology.
- Orthographic reform of the Catalan language.
- Editorial support and cultural infrastructures for the Catalan language.

They chose Barcelona as the natural centre of all these institutional reforms.

Their project was never completely fulfilled, among other reasons because of disagreements between members of Noucentisme, anti-catalanist repression under the 1923–1930 dictatorship of Miguel Primo de Rivera, and the consequent rise to popularity and power of left-wing Catalan nationalist and independentist parties. However, a large renovation of Catalan society took place, especially thanks to the reforms during the period of the Commonwealth of Catalonia and Catalan got its first consistent spelling rules with the reform led by Pompeu Fabra.

They also promoted the creation of institutions in charge of the cultural and official development of Catalan. The Bernat Metge Foundation translated Greek and Latin language classics into Catalan and the Institut d'Estudis Catalans became a regulator body for Catalan. Also dating from the Noucentista era are other official institutions to promote culture and make it widely accessible were Network of Popular Libraries, the Catalan Drama School, the School of Librarians and the Library of Catalonia.

== Prominent members ==
- Josep Carner
- Marceliano Coquillat
- Pompeu Fabra
- Josep Goday i Casals – architect
- Rafael Masó
- Eugenio d'Ors ("Xènius")
- Enric Prat de la Riba
- Josep Puig i Cadafalch
- José Ortega y Gasset
- Joaquim Sunyer

== See also ==
- Commonwealth of Catalonia – Union of the four Catalan provinces (Barcelona, Lleida, Girona and Tarragona) for administrative purposes.
- Lliga Regionalista – large Conservative party with close ties to Noucentisme.
- Modernisme – previous Catalan cultural movement.
- Modernism – not to be confused with the above-mentioned.
- Novecentismo – Spanish movement whose name shares the same root but is completely unrelated and more progressive.
- Gaziel
- Jaume Agelat i Garrega
- Sculptures in Plaça de Catalunya
