= Fall of the dictatorship of Miguel Primo de Rivera =

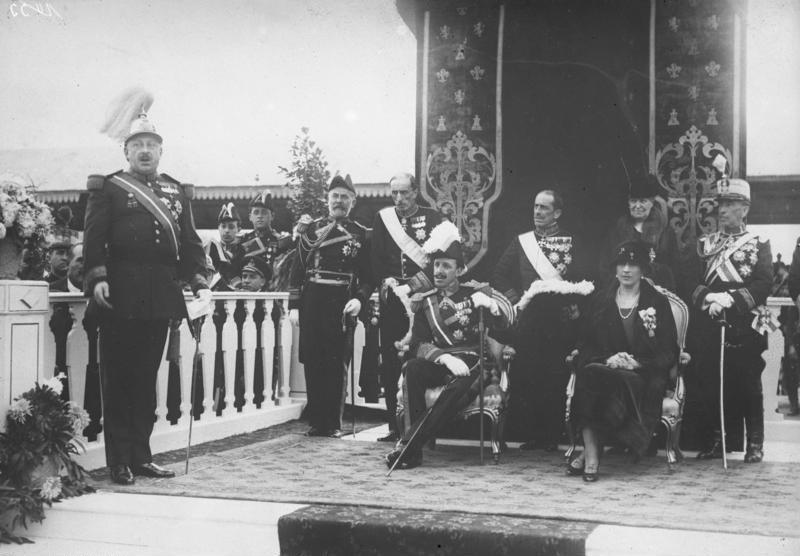
Primo de Rivera made a speech before the kings in 1927, during the commemoration of the 25th anniversary of Alfonso XIII's accession to the throne.

The fall of the dictatorship of Miguel Primo de Rivera took place on January 28, 1930, when General Miguel Primo de Rivera was forced to present his resignation to the King of Spain, Alfonso XIII, which he accepted, giving way to the Dictablanda of Dámaso Berenguer. The end of the dictatorship was the culmination of a process that began several months earlier.

Historian Genoveva García Queipo de Llano places the beginning of the crisis of the dictatorship in mid-1928, when several factors converged: the worsening of the dictator's diabetes, which shortly after leaving power would lead to his death; the failure of the dictatorship to establish a new regime; and the growing role of the opposition, which was joined by a sector of the Army that organized several armed conspiracies against the regime. Ángeles Barrio Alonso situates it slightly earlier, at the end of 1927, when with the constitution of the National Consultative Assembly it became clear that Primo de Rivera, in spite of the fact that from the beginning he had presented his regime as "temporary", had no intention of returning to the situation prior to the coup d'état of September 1923.

For his part, Alejandro Quiroga delays the beginning of the crisis to January 1929 when the insurrection led by José Sánchez Guerra took place and, despite its failure, "managed to show the cracks in a regime with less support than it claimed". "Certainly, until the beginning of 1929 there was nothing to indicate that the primorriverist regime was in crisis", adds Alejandro Quiroga. Francisco Alía Miranda agrees with Quiroga: "Since the January 1929 uprising, things were never the same again for the dictatorship. Primo de Rivera himself would confess it after his resignation to the Buenos Aires newspaper La Nación: "...they gave me the discouraging impression that the Army, that with so much correctness, loyalty and citizenship had been on the side of the dictatorship, was distancing itself from it".

== Loss of support: rupture of the "alliance of 1923" ==
The social and political sectors that had initially lent their support to the dictatorship —forming the "alliance of 1923", as Shlomo Ben-Ami called it— gradually withdrew their support: the peripheral nationalisms when the dictatorship failed to fulfill its promise of "decentralization" and ended up dissolving the Mancomunitat of Catalonia; the business organizations dissatisfied with the UGT's increased influence in labor relations —"the UGT strengthened its organizations and began to extend them to agriculture, which subverted the traditional relations between day laborers and employers in the countryside. In the cities, where small and medium-sized employers were dominant, the rise of union power translated into obligations with respect to schedules, hierarchies of trades, definition of tasks and salaries to which they were not accustomed", states Santos Juliá; the intellectual and university sectors that abandoned their "benevolent expectations", disillusioned with their conservative "regenerationism"; various liberal social and political groups that saw how the dictatorship intended to perpetuate itself in power, failing to fulfill its promise of being a "temporary regime"; etc. Likewise, the progressive loss of social and political support caused the king, according to Santos Juliá, to begin "to consider that perhaps the Crown ran some risk if it continued to be tied to the figure of the dictator".

=== Employers ===
The protectionist and interventionist economic policy of the dictatorship harmed the interests of certain economic sectors which therefore gradually withdrew their support. This was the case of the owners of the commercialized agricultural sector who complained about the policy of high tariffs because it harmed the exports of oil, wine and oranges —this was expressed, for example, by the Chamber of Commerce of Valencia as early as October 1923—. Or that of the merchants, since the protectionist policy meant high prices in the domestic market, limiting their volume of activity and reducing their profits —however, Primo de Rivera blamed them for the rise in prices, blaming it on the "excessive luxury" of their stores.

Small and medium-sized enterprises also protested against the interventionist policy which they considered to be aimed at favoring the large and monopolistic companies and also harmed the consumers because "free competition is an indispensable condition for a better quality and cheaper production", as the Superior Council of Chambers of Commerce, Industry and Navigation stated at the end of 1925, and reiterated at the beginning of 1929: "The government has long since abandoned its harmonizing function. It now invades a field which, due to the natural demands of economic life, should remain closed to any official intervention". The Confederación Gremial Española, the association of small producers which had enthusiastically supported Primo de Rivera's coup, also criticized "the actions of the regulatory committees of national production" and "the granting of monopolies, of whatever kind", since "only with absolute freedom in the establishment of business will individual initiative be stimulated and the improvement of production be pushed forward".

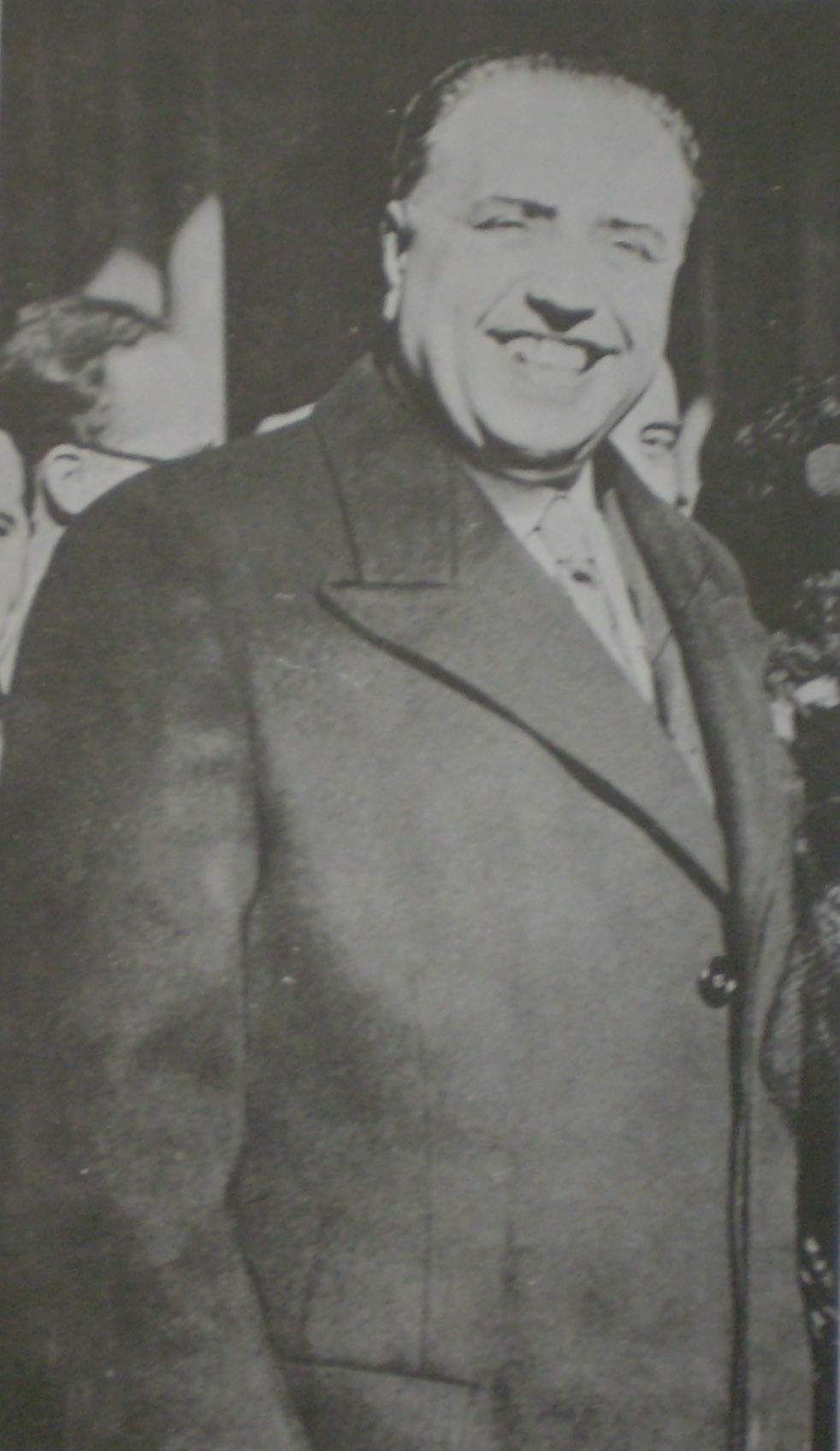
Eduardo Aunós, Minister of Labor and main promoter of the National Corporate Organization.

The increase in taxes, an "obstacle to the normal development of production", according to the employers, and the measures against tax fraud, such as the obligation to keep a "daily book of sales", were also the object of protests. One employers' organization complained that it was "a constant nightmare for traders and industrialists to be presented as the only tax fraudsters", despite the fact that they were the ones who had received the full "weight of the tax reform". The large companies also complained about the high taxes and in 1929 they also began to criticize the interventionist economic policy, which had benefited them so much until then, because of the tax burden it entailed.

Employers and businessmen were even more opposed to the regime's social policy, which, according to them, had "multiplied the advantages of social legislation" and was being carried out at their expense, as they were forced to pay more taxes to finance it. The Joint Committees of the National Corporate Organization were the object of a harsh campaign against them on the part of the employers' associations which demanded their elimination or their reform, a campaign in which the conservative and Catholic press took an active part, especially when these sectors perceived that the great beneficiaries of the corporate system, which they had always defended, were not the Free Trade Unions but the socialists of the UGT. The employers complained that the Joint Committees were not bodies exclusively dedicated to conciliation and arbitration, but that they dealt with matters which until then had been the exclusive monopoly of the employers, such as, for example, discipline or the organization of work. They went so far as to say that in the joint committees "the most serious class struggle in our history is currently taking place". The Minister of Labor Eduardo Aunós replied that the joint committees were a key instrument in Primo de Rivera's "revolution from above", the only one that could avoid "a catastrophic and anarchic revolution from below", whose main victims would be the propertied classes.

=== Army: artillery rebellion and coup d'état attempts ===
The unity shown by the Army during Primo de Rivera's coup d'état, as soon as he obtained the King's support, was not maintained for long and "in fact, the opposition of important sectors of the Army was one of the determining factors in Primo's fall", pointed out Alejandro Quiroga. "When the social order was no longer immediately threatened, the Moroccan problem had been solved and the king began to show unequivocal signs of disliking the dictatorship, a growing alienation of the armed forces from Primo de Rivera became evident", affirmed Shlomo Ben-Ami. According to Eduardo Gonzalez Calleja, the military policy of the dictatorship had a great influence in this, which "turned out to be chaotic and contradictory" as could be seen in the question of Morocco —first defending the "abandonista" position, supported by the military junteros and questioned by the military Africanists, and then the interventionist one, defended by the Africanists and criticized by the juniors— and in the promotion policy, turned into "the reign of contradiction and arbitrariness". An opinion shared by José Luis Gómez Navarro: "From September 1925 onwards, all the military policy of the dictatorship, from the development of the war in Morocco with the landing of Al Hoceima to the changes in the promotion systems, meant the triumph of the spirit and the model of the Africanist army over this of the junteros, reopening and aggravating this confrontation".

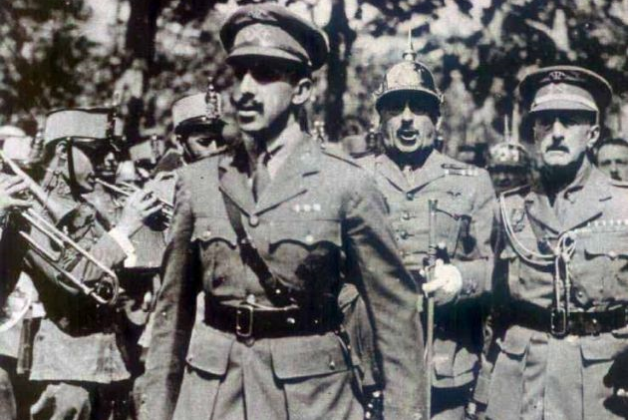
King Alfonso XIII, in the uniform of Captain General, inspecting the troops. Behind him the dictator Primo de Rivera and to his left General Joaquín Milans del Bosch, Captain General of Catalonia and, later, head of the King's Military Household.

The management of promotions had always been a very controversial issue, especially in the Infantry, since the junteros defended that only seniority should be taken into account, while the Africanists supported war merits. Progressively, the dictatorship took control of the Board of Classification of Generals and Colonels, so it was Primo de Rivera who ultimately decided the promotions, rewarding the like-minded military and punishing the critics. A Royal Decree of July 4, 1926, established that it was not necessary to communicate the reasons why certain chiefs and officers had not been promoted and furthermore denied them any possibility of appeal. The resulting arbitrariness in promotions —which became evident especially after the landing of Al Hoceima in which a flood of promotions for war merits took place— motivated the distancing of some chiefs and officers who began to conspire against the dictatorship by contacting politicians of the parties of the turn dislodged from power. "Many of the memoirs and political works written by military officers during these and later years reveal personal grievances, rather than an anti-dictatorial militancy based on deep ideological convictions", said Gonzalez Calleja. "The concentration of power in the hands of the Marquis of Estella (something habitual in his way of governing) and his arbitrariness when exercising it (also a classic primorriverista), decreeing dazzling promotions within the Army, generally of Africanists, led numerous generals and colonels to gradually position themselves against the dictator", emphasized Alejandro Quiroga.

In this context of internal confrontations, on February 20, 1927, it was decreed the reestablishment of the General Military Academy, which had already existed in Toledo between 1882 and 1893, with the aim, not only of improving the training of the officers, but also of reestablishing "the unity of the military family by promoting comradeship", according to Eduardo González Calleja. This same historian interprets the appointment of General Franco as its director "as a gesture of reconciliation with the Africanists, achieved after the operations of the summer of 1925". Alejandro Quiroga makes a similar assessment: "The appointment of Francisco Franco as director of the General Military Academy of Zaragoza only confirmed the Africanist bias of the dictator in the eyes of many peninsular chiefs and officers close to the Juntas". Javier Moreno Luzón and José Luis Gómez-Navarro also agree.

Coat of arms of the Artillery Academy of Segovia, which was closed by order of Primo de Rivera during the conflict with the Artillery Corps.

The main military conflict that the dictatorship had to face was the rebellion of the Artillery, which opposed the suppression, by a Royal Decree of June 9, 1926, of the closed scale —promotions by seniority— which was in force in that Corps, as well as in the rest of the more technical corps of the Army —Engineers and Military Health. The protests were immediate and reached the king, to whom they asked for the repeal of the decree and the dismissal of Primo de Rivera. The king intervened, which had its effects, since the dictator was forced to agree on a verbal pact with the artillerymen, also to prevent them from joining the coup d'état that General Aguilera was plotting, and which would be known as the Sanjuanada: promotions for war merits would only be granted exceptionally and would be subject to appeal before the Third Chamber of the Supreme Court.

However, the truce only lasted a month because the government, having overcome the danger of the "Sanjuanada", approved on July 26, 1926, a Royal Decree granting the power to grant "special" promotions in certain circumstances, which again raised the protests of the artillerymen, since it established the principle of promotion by election. On September 4, the active chiefs and officers initiated a "plante" consisting of voluntary reclusion in their barracks. The following day Primo de Rivera decreed a state of war throughout Spain, closed the Artillery Academy of Segovia and suspended from employment, salary and privileges all active officers —some 1200— except those stationed in Morocco, while taking control of the Artillery Parks. These measures, which had the full backing of the king, meant the de facto dissolution of the Artillery Corps. The artillerymen finally gave in and, in December, they were reinstated in their functions after accepting the reform and committing themselves to be loyal to the king and the Government. However, "the indignation against the regime and the king was long-lasting", since the artillerymen participated from then on in all the anti-dictatorial plots, such as the one that exploded in Ciudad Real and Valencia at the beginning of 1929. After the failure of the plot, Primo de Rivera again dissolved the Artillery Corps and definitively closed the Artillery Academy of Segovia, which deepened the distancing of the artillerymen from the regime.

Although Alfonso XIII supported Primo de Rivera, the conflict with the artillerymen seriously damaged the relationship between the king and Primo de Rivera, since when the monarch tried to mediate, the latter was radically opposed, threatening to resign and reminding the king that the Army was under his command. On the other hand, the king's acceptance of the dissolution of the army was interpreted by the artillerymen as a connivance between Alfonso XIII and Primo de Rivera. Thus, "the conflict with the artillerymen did not fail to have repercussions in the following years, and the most important of them was that it accentuated the progressive distancing from the king". On the other hand, the dissolution also "increased the distancing [from the dictatorship] of broad sectors of the aristocracy who were appalled to see how a body with a large number of nobles among its members was being closed" and of other closed scale bodies such as Engineers and Military Health.

There were two coup d'état attempts to oust Primo de Rivera from power and return to the constitutional system. The first was known as the Sanjuanada because it was planned for June 24, 1926. The conspiracy involved the liberal generals Valeriano Weyler and Francisco Aguilera, and prominent members of the "old politics" such as Melquiades Álvarez, who drafted the manifesto A la Nación y al Ejército de Mar y Tierra (To the Nation and the Army of Land and Sea). The liaison officer with the anarchists was Captain Fermín Galán, who would lead the Jaca uprising of December 1930, during the Dictablanda of Dámaso Berenguer. "The indecision, the varied composition of the conspirators —a mosaic, in the dictator's words— and the lack of clear and concrete objectives led to the failure of the Sanjuanada", said Francisco Alía Miranda. "In reaction to this attempted coup, the dictator handed out fines left, right and centre".

The second coup attempt took place in January 1929 and its main scenarios were Valencia and Ciudad Real. The civilian leader of the movement was the conservative politician José Sánchez Guerra and the military leader was General Eduardo López Ochoa, although the real mastermind of the conspiracy was Miguel Villanueva. The artillerymen were the protagonists of the uprising in the La Mancha city. They took control of the city with great ease, but gave up when they realized that they were alone, since none of the garrisons committed had joined the pronunciamiento. In spite of the failure, "the news of the uprising of the artillerymen from La Mancha was published in the most important national and international newspapers, which gave signs of uneasiness inside the country and discredit abroad. The courts of justice [which imposed light sentences and even acquitted some of those involved, such as Sánchez Guerra himself] gave the dictator the final blow".

Primo de Rivera decided to punish the artillerymen for the participation of some of them in the coup d'état and in a council of ministers held on February 19, presided over by Alfonso XIII, a decree was approved by which the corps was again disbanded. "The king, in favor of less drastic and more clement measures, was opposed; but, after a long discussion, he ended up signing the decree". A royalist artillery general wrote in a letter to Primo de Rivera: "Several generations must pass before the artillerymen forget what the king promised them without fulfilling it". Another artilleryman, Antonio Cordón, this one a Republican, wrote in his memoirs Trayectoria (memories of an artilleryman): "The indignation of the artillerymen against Primo de Rivera also extended to the sovereign, since the majority, even many monarchists, considered that the King should not have signed the decree".

Attempted coups d'état were a novelty that had legitimized the dictatorship itself —it was lawful to resort to military force (as the old pronunciamiento) to overthrow a government and change a regime— and "in this sense, the dictatorship was like a return to 19th century politics", said Santos Juliá. An observation shared by Javier Moreno Luzón: "The victory of the 1923 coup, validated by Alfonso XIII, had reopened the box of thunder, since it legitimized the use of violence, or armed threats, with the aim of upsetting the political situation. The insurrectionary customs of the 19th century, which had been cornered —or at least diminished— during the almost fifty years of the Restoration, returned with 20th century updates".

In fact, the attempted coup d'état of January 1929, although it failed, "showed the whole country that Primo did not have total control of the Army, no matter how much he boasted about it". This was confirmed when the Superior Council of War and Navy lowered the initial sentences and annulled the death sentences and life sentences imposed in a court martial on the Ciudad Real artillerymen. Even more so when, in October 1929, the military tribunal that tried him absolved José Sánchez Guerra, arguing that his actions had been lawful because they were directed against an unlawful regime. "Primo flew into a rage".

On the other hand, internal frictions "encouraged the process of radicalization of a minority sector of the Army", especially after the frustrated coup of January 1929 led by Sánchez Guerra. In May, General Weyler, directly involved in the coup, wrote to Socialist leader Indalecio Prieto that it was necessary to "act without hesitation or weakness" against "the reaction [that] has us immobilized". "The state of things in Spain moves my spirit to despair. I declare that I have never known such a fierce and tenacious threat against our democratic ideology", he also told him. Shortly afterwards, a group of officers, among them Ramón Franco, Juan Hernández Sarabia, Arturo Menéndez, Fermín Galán and Ángel García Hernández —the last two led the Jaca uprising; the first three held important posts during the Second Republic— founded the clandestine Unión Militar Republicana (Republican Military Union). The manifesto they made public stated: "We want to go to an essentially democratic Republic by means of a popular movement supported by the Army".

José Luis Gómez-Navarro pointed out that "the result of the military policies of the dictatorship and the involvement of Alfonso XIII in them, either in an active and leading role, or as the ultimate political leader of the regime and with the power to sign or not the decrees submitted to him, had lethal consequences for the relations between Alfonso XIII and the armed forces.... The figure of the soldier-king, the king defender of the armed forces, was pulverized for these sectors [harmed by Primo de Rivera's military policy] throughout the dictatorship. Thus, these sectors of the army drifted from an anti-dictatorial sentiment to an anti-monarchist, or at least anti-Alfonso sentiment. [...] In 1923 there was a relatively united army, albeit fragile, and at the service of the king. On the contrary, in 1930, the army suffered from a deep division and important sectors of it felt very distanced from the monarchy and some were even openly fighting for republicanism. This transformation was undoubtedly an effect of the dictatorship".

=== University rebellion ===
The first student protests took place in the spring of 1925, promoted by the recently created Unión Liberal de Estudiantes (ULE), which grouped the republican students. The most serious incident was led by the students of the School of Agricultural Engineers, headed by Antonio María Sbert, who did not attend a ceremony presided over by the king in protest because Primo de Rivera rejected the petition they wanted to present to him for not being made "through the regulatory process". The dictator's reaction was to expel Sbert from the School and confine him to Cuenca.

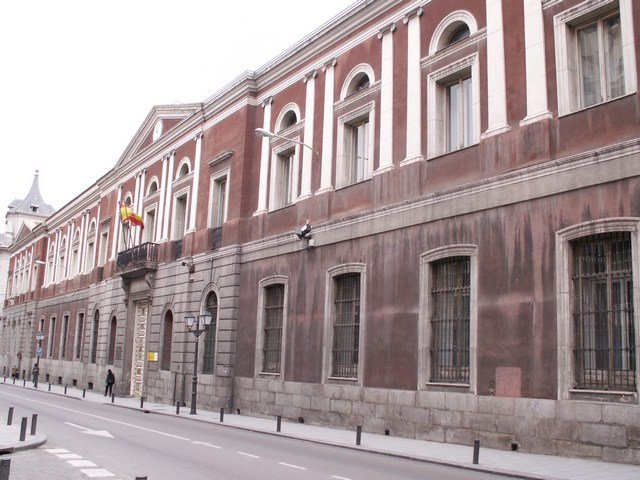
Building of the former Central University of Madrid on San Bernardo Street.

At the end of 1926 Sbert and two other students created in Madrid the Federación Universitaria Escolar (FUE), as an alternative to the hitherto hegemonic Asociación de Estudiantes Católicos (AEC). The first important strike called by the FUE was in March 1928, in protest against the case brought against Professor Luis Jiménez de Asúa for a lecture he gave at the University of Murcia on birth control, but the most important movement promoted by the FUE was the protest against the Callejo Law enacted in May 1928, article 53 of which allowed the two private higher education centers then existing in Spain, both owned by the Catholic Church —the Augustinians of El Escorial, and the Jesuits of Deusto— to issue university degrees. In principle, as Eduardo Gonzalez Calleja has pointed out, it was "a self-defense response of the students who were heading towards liberal professionals against the plethora of graduates coming from the denominational educational establishments".

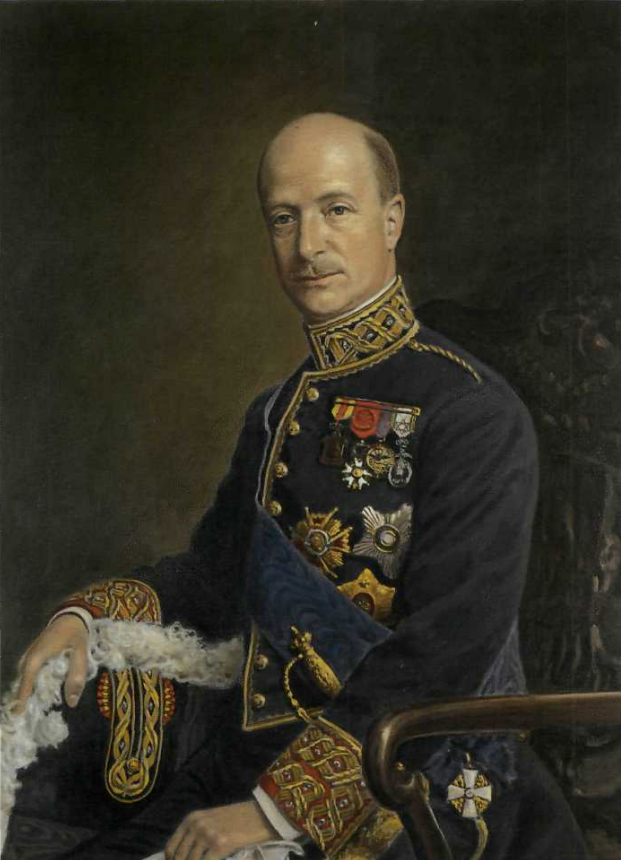
Eduardo Callejo de la Cuesta, Minister of Public Instruction, promoter of what is known as the Callejo Law, which provoked protests by university students mobilized by the Federación Universitaria Escolar (FUE).

The protest against the Callejo Law became more intense in 1929 — in that year there were already 60,000 students enrolled when in 1923 there were only 22,000. In fact, "the resumption of the university revolt in March 1929 was the first great act of opposition to the regime after the attempt of Ciudad Real and Valencia". On February 27, an assembly of student associations called a strike for March 7. The Government responded with the expulsion from the university (and from all Spanish universities) of FUE leader Sbert, which further inflamed tempers. On the scheduled date, riots and street demonstrations took place, which had a great public impact, as they were the first to be held in the interior of Spain against the dictatorship and the Monarchy. The students invaded the faculties, smashed effigies of the king —whom they ironically nicknamed "Alfonso the university student" or "Alfonso the wise"— and waved the red flag of the FUE while they clashed with the police. On the façade of the Royal Palace appeared the expressive graffiti "For Rent" and a statue of Alfonso XIII was decapitated and stained with red paint with the appearance of blood. There were also demonstrations and riots in other universities, where sometimes, as in Madrid, "We are not artillerymen!" was shouted. On March 9, Primo de Rivera dismissed the rector of the University of Madrid and the deans of all the faculties, being replaced by a Commissariat Regia. On March 10, the police and the Civil Guard stormed the university buildings, while the students stoned the dictator's house and the headquarters of the conservative newspaper ABC. On March 11, Primo de Rivera ordered the Army to occupy the faculties and threatened all students who persisted in the strike with the loss of their tuition. Only those who supported the Association of Catholic Students (5%) returned to class. The following days the students continued the strike and erected barricades in the center of the capital and burned kiosks of the Catholic newspaper El Debate. On March 13, there were serious incidents in Valladolid and Valencia. On March 16, the government closed the Central University of Madrid, followed by the closure of six others throughout Spain. More than one hundred professors and lecturers showed their solidarity with the students and some of them, such as José Ortega y Gasset, Luis Jiménez de Asúa, Felipe Sánchez Román, Fernando de los Ríos and Alfonso García-Valdecasas, resigned their professorships.

After a period of some calm, on April 9, the riots resumed and the universities were closed again. They reopened on April 24, and most students returned to class.A week earlier the University of Barcelona was closed after clashes between students and youths of the Patriotic Union (Patriotic Union Youth, JUP) who had been mobilized by the dictatorship to end the strike and who had been authorized to carry revolvers (although this permission was later revoked). On May 19, Primo de Rivera began to concede by reinstating the academic authorities in their functions and annulling the sanctions against the students, and finally on September 21, he repealed the controversial article 53 of the Callejo Law.

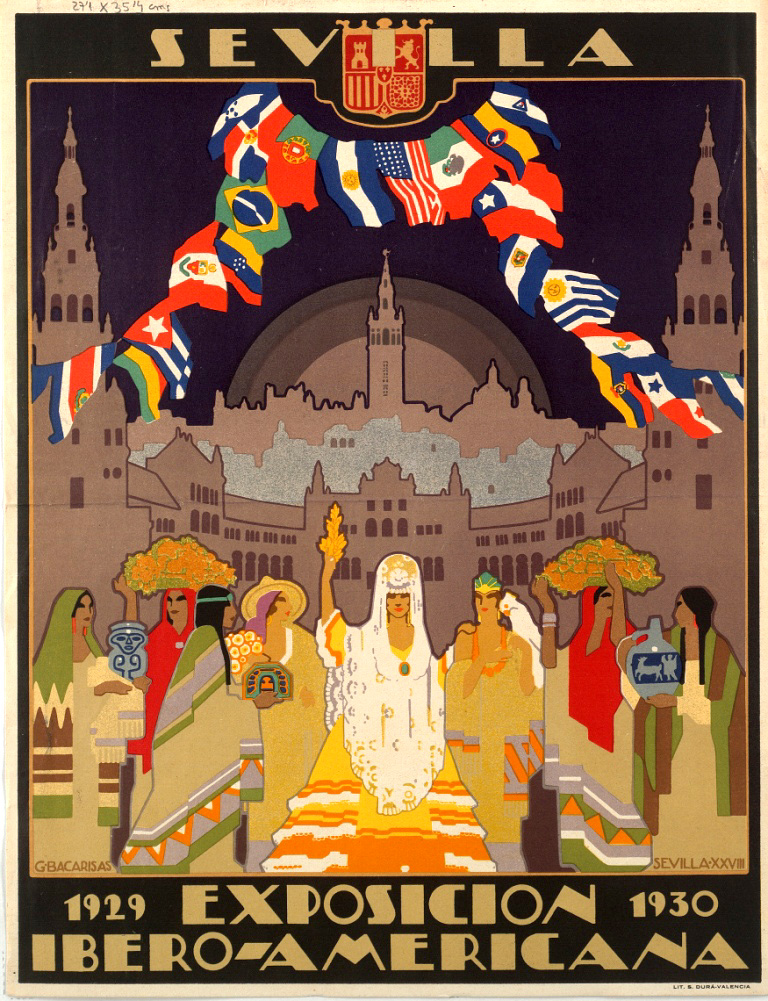
Poster of the Ibero-American Exposition of Seville inaugurated by King Alfonso XIII and the dictator on May 9, 1929. Ensuring its success, as well as that of Barcelona, was one of the reasons that led Primo de Rivera to finally surrender to the student rebellion.

Primo de Rivera's final capitulation to the student movement was also due to pressure from the business world and the need to ensure the holding of the Barcelona and Seville expositions. The Chamber of Commerce of Madrid asked the government to give in to the student demands "for the benefit of commerce", and the conservative newspaper ABC asked for "indulgence" towards the students "in order to guarantee the success of the international exhibitions" of Seville and Barcelona which were inaugurated at the beginning of May of that year. Primo de Rivera was also mindful that student unrest could jeopardize not only the exhibitions, but also the meeting of the Assembly of the League of Nations Assembly that was to be held in Madrid. "The question of his reputation abroad obsessed Primo", warned Alejandro Quiroga. An example of the dictator's concern was the publication, at the height of the student revolt, of a leaflet from the Spanish Tourist Office in London in which it was stated that "the British public was the victim of alarmist information deliberately promoted [by] [...] the revolutionary scum with the intention of making the Barcelona and Seville exhibitions fail, as part of a calculated maneuver for their own benefit".

Alejandro Quiroga has pointed out that "if the university revolt demonstrated anything, it was the very limited influence of the JUP among university students and, by extension, among urban middle-class youth. Unlike the [Italian] young fascists... the JUP proved inept at stopping the anti-dictatorial mobilizations". Nor did the propaganda deployed by the official media, such as the newspaper La Nación, accusing the students of being manipulated by the "bad Spaniards" and by the "enemies of the Regime" and the mobilization of the Patriotic Union and the celebration of numerous acts in homage to the dictator, in which Primo de Rivera himself participated on many occasions, to "highlight before foreigners the true national opinion", put an end to the revolt. In this sense, "the exhibitions in Barcelona and Seville acquired an even more relevant propagandistic character than they already had for Primo". On May 9, King Alfonso XIII, accompanied by the dictator, inaugurated the one in Seville and ten days later the one in Barcelona.

The repeal of Article 53, however, did not stop the student protest —"a dictatorship that capitulates is a defeated regime, and the students were well aware of this", stated Ben-Ami. The FUE demanded the rehabilitation of Sbert, the lifting of sanctions against professors and the recognition of students' freedom of association. Thus student agitation resumed on January 22, 1930. "On January 28, Primo de Rivera presented his resignation to the king, the echo of the student clamor still ringing in his ears", comments Shlomo Ben-Ami.

=== Opposition from the intellectuals ===
As Shlomo Ben-Ami has pointed out, Primo de Rivera "did not make the slightest effort to win over the intellectuals. A man of action, he despised the "semi-intellectuals", men of letters and words, for whom he said he felt a mixture of pity and disdain". In fact, "intellectuals were a real headache for the dictator", said Francisco Alía Miranda.

The first conflict of the dictatorship with the intellectuals took place a few weeks after the coup and had as its epicenter the Ateneo de Madrid when, in mid-November 1923, the Board chaired by Angel Ossorio resigned and suspended the planned activities in protest that a government delegate was present at each of the events to be held, to avoid criticizing the directorate as had already happened in the conference delivered on November 7, by the former deputy Rodrigo Soriano entitled "Yesterday, today and tomorrow". On January 31, 1924, elections were held, winning the candidacy presided by the "conciliatory" Armando Palacio Valdés, but he resigned three weeks later when political debates reappeared within the institution, which was closed on February 22, by order of Primo de Rivera. The same thing happened the following year, for example, to the Ateneo de Ciudad Real.

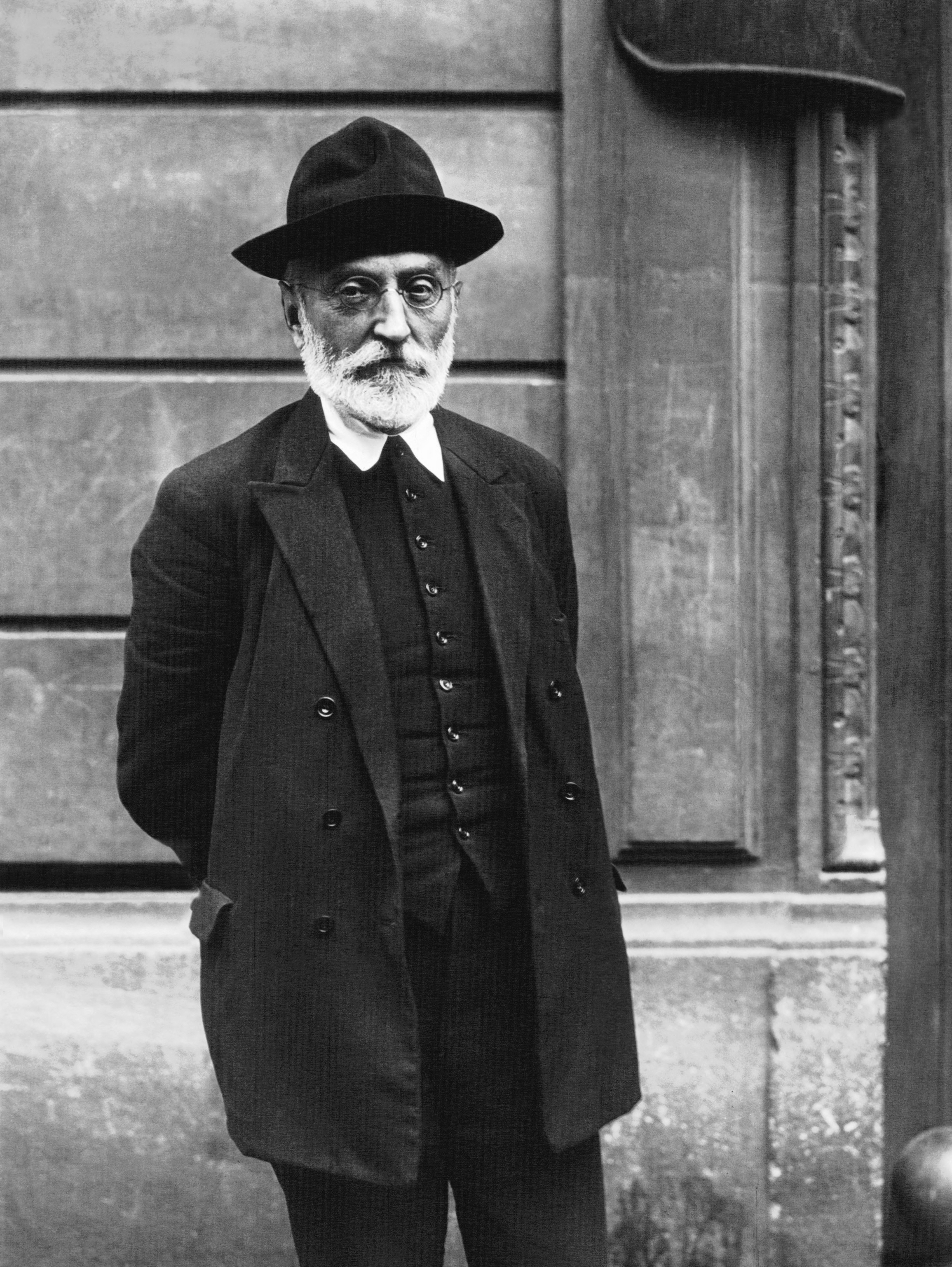
Miguel de Unamuno exiled in Paris (1925).

Sonnet written in exile by Miguel de Unamuno dedicated to Primo Rivera on the occasion of his appointment in 1926 as doctor honoris causa by the University of Salamanca, from whom the dictator had deprived him of his position as rector.

It does not move, Miguel, to admire you,
the way you have achieved power,
nor do I admire that parody of a party,
that you now try to protect yourself with.
Nor do I admire your skill or art,
gagging a numb town,
nor do I admire the assembly you have concocted,
so that it will always have to endure you.
Admire you, Miguel, in a way
so fervent, so mystical and sincere,
that you can have neither truce nor pause
for the distinguished audacity and the freshness
to accept the honoris causa biretta,
without cause, honor or culture.

The next conflict had as its protagonist the writer and professor Miguel de Unamuno, who was banished on January 21, 1924, to the island of Fuerteventura for having published in the Argentine weekly Nosotros a letter in which he described the dictator as a "botarate with no more brains than a cricket". A month later, on February 22, 1924, the same day of the closing of the Ateneo de Madrid, the press published the suspension of Unamuno's employment and salary and the loss of all his academic positions at the University of Salamanca. Months later Unamuno did not avail himself of the amnesty decreed on July 4, 1924, by the directorate and went into self-exile in France —when leaving Fuerteventura he said: "I will return, not with my freedom, which matters nothing, but with yours"—, becoming, as Eduardo González Calleja has pointed out, "the most enduring myth of the movement of intellectual opposition to the regime". There he joined the criticism of the republican writer Vicente Blasco Ibáñez who published two pamphlets against the dictatorship and against the king —one of them entitled Alphonse XIII demasqué ('Alfonso XIII unmasked')— which were clandestinely introduced in Spain.

Shortly after the sanctioning of Unamuno, the first collective protest of intellectuals against the dictatorship took place. It was a manifesto of March 1924 against the persecution of the Catalan language, which had been written by Pedro Sainz Rodríguez. Three months later a new manifesto critical of the dictatorship appeared on the occasion of the creation of the Patriotic Union and was signed by 175 people, among them Sáinz Rodríguez and José Ortega y Gasset. The latter was answered with a scornful "official note" from Primo de Rivera, which "was the first sign of the violent anti-intellectualism that from 1926 onwards would grip the dictator and irreversibly erode his relations with the Spanish intelligence elite", states González Calleja.

The next conflict also involved Professor Sáinz Rodríguez, who criticized the dictatorship at the opening of the 1924–1925 academic year at the Central University. On October 27, 1924, a banquet was organized in his honor at the Palace Hotel which was attended by 300 diners, among them prominent politicians of the parties of the time. It was dissolved by the police amidst shouts in favor of freedom, after several anti-dictatorial speeches were made. Among those arrested were Generals Dámaso Berenguer and Leopoldo Sarabia, who had also attended the banquet.

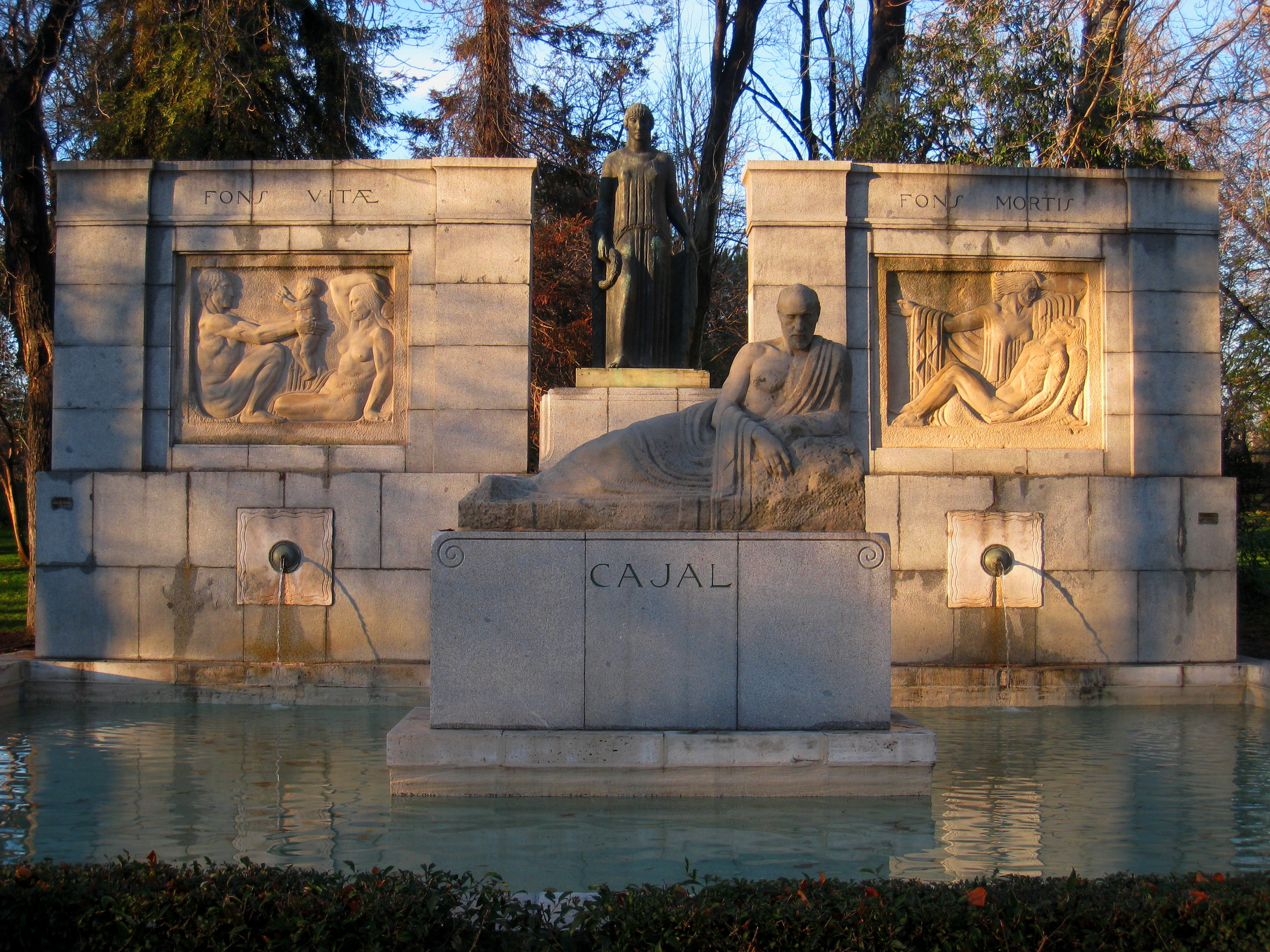
Monument to Ramón y Cajal in the Retiro Park in Madrid, whose inauguration on April 24, 1926, provoked a new confrontation between Primo de Rivera and the intellectuals critical of his regime.

The definitive confrontation between Primo de Rivera and the intellectuals critical of his regime took place on the occasion of the inauguration of a monument in homage to Santiago Ramón y Cajal in the Retiro Park in Madrid on April 24, 1926. When the dictator knew that a parallel ceremony was going to be organized, he published an unofficial note against those who "call themselves intellectuals". A few days later the students protested against the filling of the chair that Unamuno had left vacant at the University of Salamanca, with whom the professor Luis Jiménez de Asúa expressed his solidarity, for which he was deported to the Chafarinas Islands on April 30, from where he was able to return on May 18, thanks to the amnesty dictated on the occasion of the King's fortieth birthday.

From then on there was a proliferation of essays critical of the dictatorship and the Monarchy and demanding the establishment of a democratic regime. Likewise, in June 1928, the Liga de Educación Social (Social Education League) was founded, made up of the most prominent intellectuals opposed to the regime: Luis Jiménez de Asúa, Gregorio Marañón, Ramón María del Valle-Inclán, Ramón Pérez de Ayala and Manuel Azaña. On the contrary, other intellectuals supported the dictatorship, adopting anti-democratic and anti-liberal positions, such as Ramiro de Maeztu and Eugenio D'Ors, which brought them closer to the traditional extreme right, represented by José María Pemán and José Pemartín. In April 1929, Federico García Lorca and Pedro Salinas, two outstanding poets of the so-called Generation of '27 whose members had not interfered in political issues (they would do so during the Second Republic, mostly in favor of it), published an open letter to intellectuals in which they expressed their opposition to "apoliticism" and appealed to men with a liberal sensibility.

According to Eduardo González Calleja,

The persecution suffered at the hands of the dictatorship by a prominent sector of the Spanish intelligentsia led it to recreate the liberating phraseology inherited from the French Revolution, and to transform itself —sometimes, much to its regret— into a guide for the people. [...] With the dictablanda of Dámaso Berenguer, intellectuals such as the well-known cases of Ortega and Azorín took the definitive step from a critical attitude towards the Monarchy to a militant commitment to the Republic.

=== Conflict with the Catalan clergy ===
The only conflict the dictatorship had with the Catholic Church was over the resistance of the Catalan bishops, led by the archbishop of Tarragona, Francesc Vidal i Barraquer, and the bishop of Barcelona Josep Miralles, to order parish priests to preach in Spanish. Primo de Rivera pressured the Holy See to force them to obey, even threatening to create a national Church if they did not. Finally Rome gave in and between the middle of 1928 and the beginning of 1929 the Catalan prelates received five decrees with indications on the use of Catalan in the liturgy and on the rules of conduct they should follow in political matters —Primo de Rivera had accused the Catalan clergy of favoring "separatism"—.

== Monetary and financial crisis ==
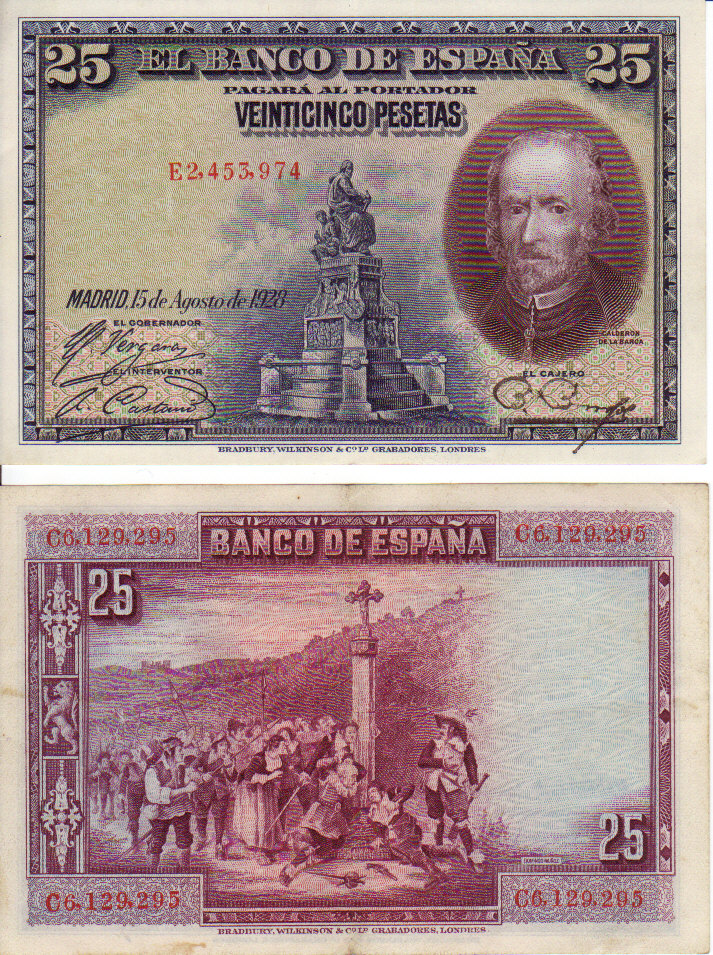
Obverse and reverse of a 25 peseta banknote issued by the Banco de España in 1928.

One of the key points of the dictatorship's propaganda had been that it had managed to reestablish the value of the peseta —the "depreciation of the currency" had been one of the reasons given to justify the coup d'état—. When Primo de Rivera came to power, the exchange rate of the dollar was 7.50 pesetas, and in the following years the Spanish currency was revalued against both the dollar and the pound sterling. In 1927 the exchange rate of the dollar was 5.18 pesetas —and that of the pound sterling a little less than 28 pesetas—. The problem was that the revaluation of the peseta was largely artificial, since it was mainly due to the speculative movements of foreign capital attracted by the high interest rates and by the bullish perspectives of the currency —which responded to the decrease in the deficit of the balance of trade and, above all, to the consolidation of the dictatorial regime with the victory in the Rif War and the changeover from a military directorate to a civil directorate in December 1925—.

The revaluation of the peseta, on the other hand, alerted the exporting sectors, headed by the Catalan industrialists, who protested because it made foreign sales more difficult. Francesc Cambó accused the government of encouraging speculation on the currency. Primo de Rivera and his Finance Minister, José Calvo Sotelo, on the other hand, saw the rise of the peseta as "the symbol of resurgence of the nation", and stressed that it was approaching its parity with gold fixed at 25.22 pesetas per pound sterling. "Parity with gold for the peseta! Long live Spain!" they said, which further fueled speculation on the Spanish currency.

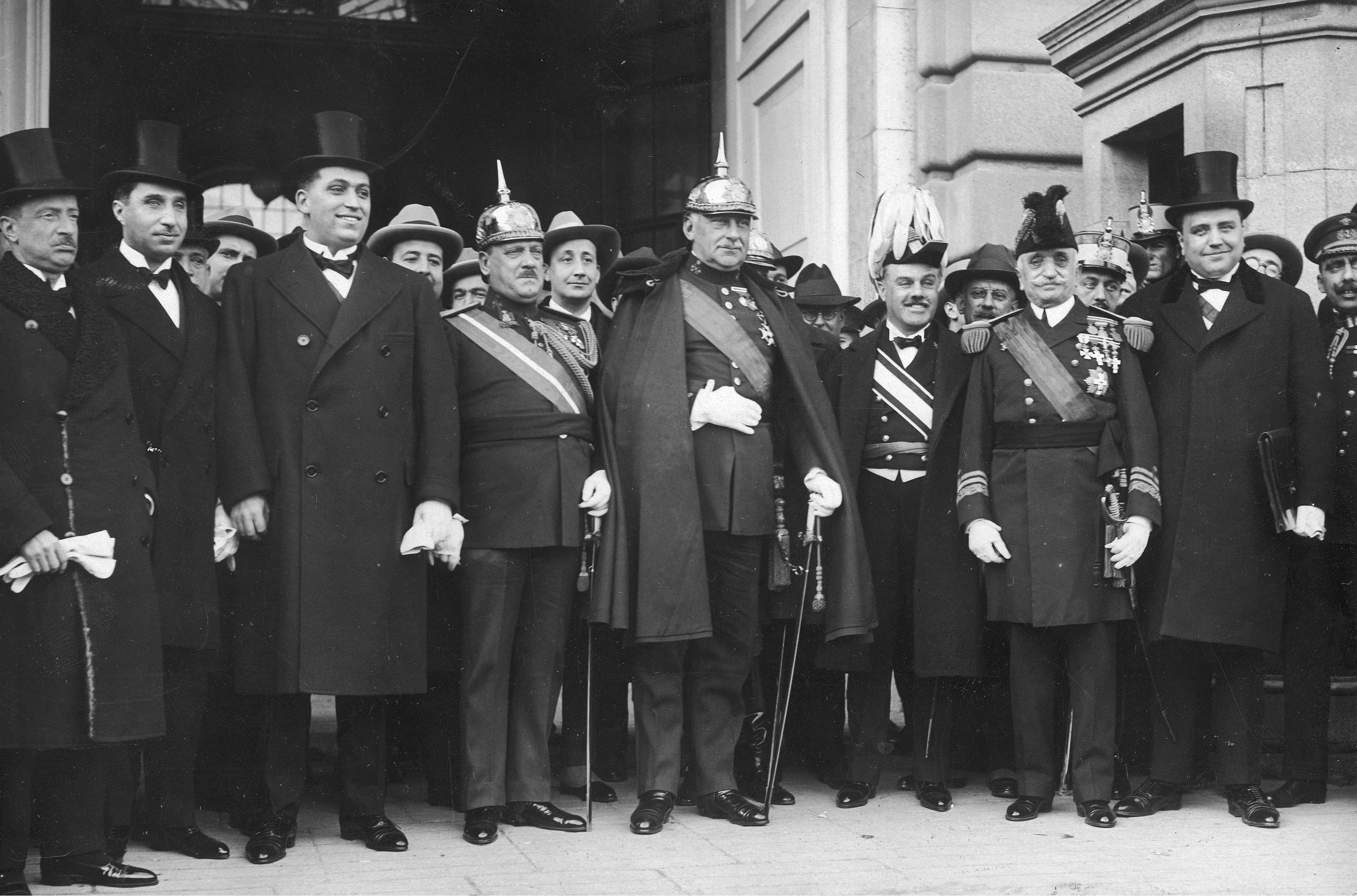
The members of Primo de Rivera's civil directorate in December 1925. In the front row, from left to right, Eduardo Callejo (Public Instruction), José Yanguas (State), José Calvo Sotelo (Treasury), Severiano Martínez Anido (Interior), Miguel Primo de Rivera (President), Count of Guadalhorce (Public Works), Honorio Cornejo (Navy) and Eduardo Aunós (Labor).

But in 1928 the speculative movement changed its sign —foreign capital began to leave the country— and a progressive depreciation of the peseta began, fed by doubts about the continuity of the regime and by the high budget deficit of the State, which in 1928 exceeded 1000 million pesetas —the public works program, which had been another of the achievements highlighted by the propaganda of the dictatorship, was being financed with the issue of public debt, since the income of the State had not increased as no fiscal reform had been implemented—. The response of Finance Minister José Calvo Sotelo was to create, in June 1928, an Exchange Intervention Committee (CIC) with a fund of 500 million pesetas to intervene in the London market and support the peseta, bringing it to parity with gold —"for Calvo Sotelo, an unstable peseta or a stable peseta at a devalued rate... was "incompatible with the vigor of the Motherland", states Ben-Ami—. But it was soon proven that the measure was insufficient —Calvo Sotelo even blamed the "enemies" of the regime for the loss of value of the peseta—. The next one was agreed in December 1928 —a half-point increase in interest rates— which did not work, nor did the attempt to restrict imports to reduce the balance of trade deficit.

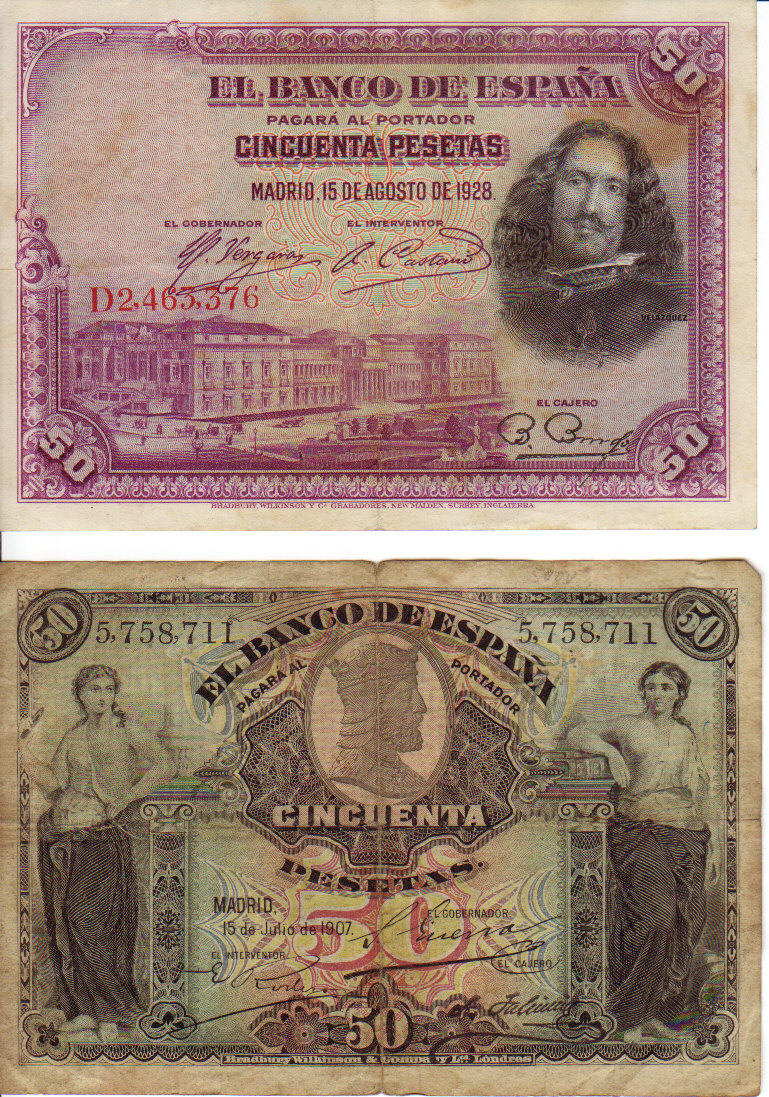
Obverse and reverse of a 50 peseta bill issued by the Banco de España in 1928.

In October 1929, the foreign exchange intervention policy was suspended because the 500 million pesetas of the CIC had already been spent and had been of no use, since the peseta had continued to fall —a pound cost 35 pesetas at that time—. The following month it was decided to tackle one of the basic problems, the high budget deficit, and the Extraordinary Budget, the accounting artifice that Calvo Sotelo had devised to increase public expenditure without apparently increasing the deficit, was put to an end, but Calvo Sotelo still refused to devalue the peseta, because he considered it an "unpatriotic" decision —it also implied recognizing the weakness of the dictatorship—. His alternative was to issue a new loan for 350 million pesetas to be subscribed by Spanish banks, trusting, according to Eduardo González Calleja, "that the patriotism of Spanish capitalism would cover the issue". But the loan failed miserably and Calvo Sotelo had no choice but to resign on January 21, 1930, only a week before the resignation of Primo de Rivera. The parity of the peseta had fallen to 40 pesetas per pound, "a difficult reality to digest", commented Ben-Ami.

Regarding the influence of the monetary and financial crisis in the fall of Primo de Rivera, historian Eduardo González Calleja states the following:

The withdrawal of confidence of the economic forces also had its influence on the fall of Primo, who had recognized at the end of the year [1929] the bankruptcy of his monetary policy. Given the primorriverist obsession with identifying the foreign exchange situation with the soundness of the regime, the devaluations contributed decisively to the discredit of the dictatorship.

According to Shlomo Ben-Ami,

As the financial failures of the regime became evident, the loss of confidence of the wealthy in their political future became more pronounced. It was a vicious circle, as the economic association Sociedad de Amigos del País of Barcelona explained in a public manifesto. The regime's lack of political perspective, it claimed, could not inspire confidence in the money market. But confidence among Spanish capitalists, "alarmed" and "panic-stricken", could only be restored by a political stabilization which they did not see coming. [...] The fluctuations of the exchange rate of the peseta became the nightmare of the businessmen... The Superior Council of the Chambers of Commerce, Industry and Navigation protested in very angry terms: "There is a deep alarm produced by the fact that [the] oscillations [of the peseta] with a progressive tendency is no longer daily, but rather sharp by the hour. The seriousness of the case and the damage it causes justify the nervousness of the great mass of producers and merchants, and, above all, of the commerce obliged to bear the variations in the international value of the peseta, which neither for buying nor for selling abroad allow adopting a firm position, or one that, at least, promises not to destroy the prospect of any business deal".

== Growth of the opposition ==
Francisco Alía Miranda locates the growth of the opposition to the dictatorship in the interior of the country from 1926 when it took over from the exterior opposition organized from Paris, since between 1923 and 1925 "all the opposing political forces remained in the shadows, waiting for a good occasion to resuscitate", "given the enormous popularity of the dictatorship" during those three years. From the constitution of the Civil Directory in December 1925, it was clear that the dictatorship intended to perpetuate itself in power by abandoning its initial promise of having a "provisional character".

=== Monarchists ===
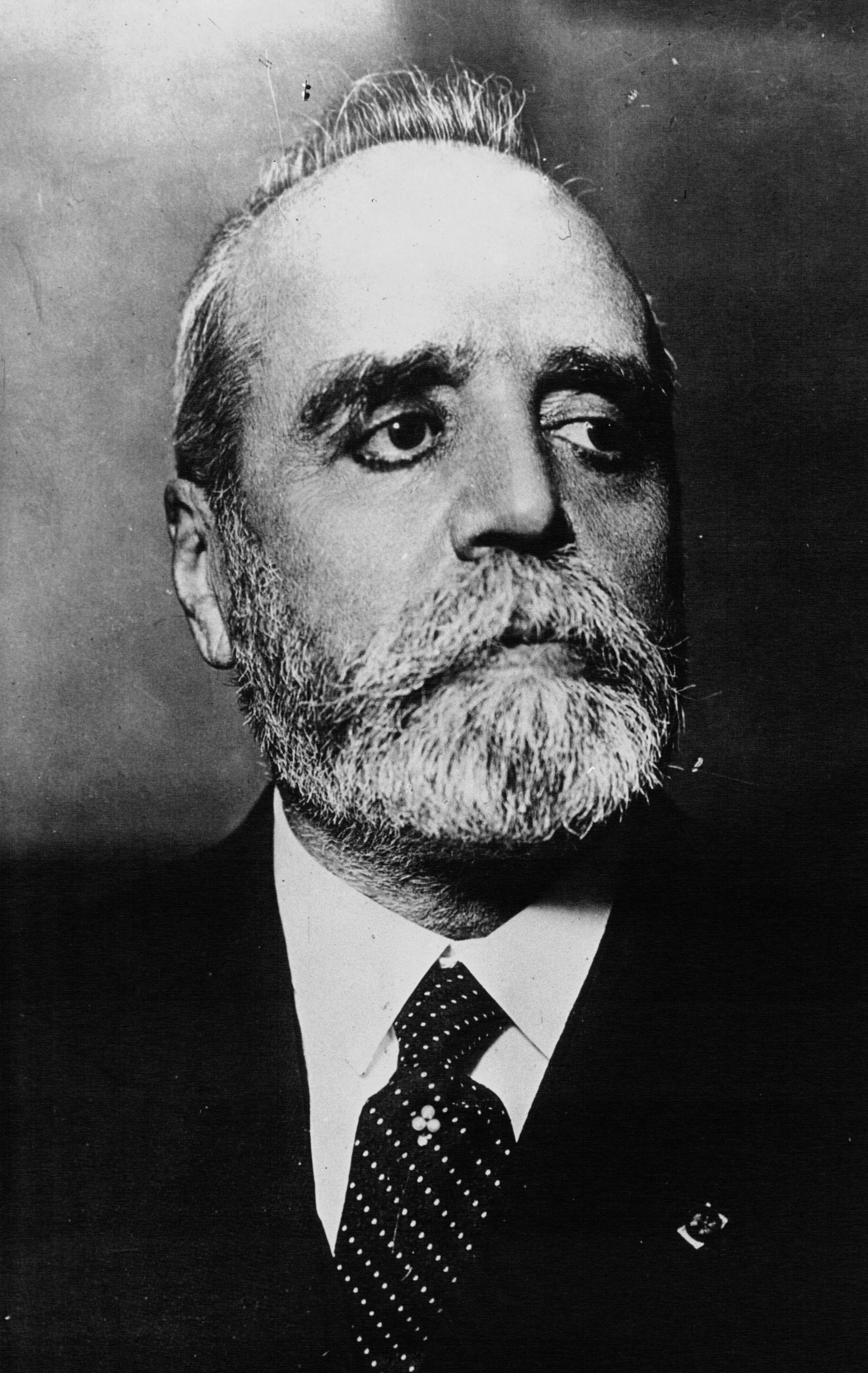
José Sánchez Guerra in 1932.

The parties of the turn, the Conservative Party (Spain) and the Liberal Party, practically disappeared as a consequence of their removal from power, the closing of the Cortes and the policy of "descuaje del caciquismo". "His clientele dispersed in a few days". A good part of his notables, who at the beginning of the dictatorship had remained in expectation, broke with the king when they verified that Alfonso XIII firmly supported it without caring about violating the Constitution of 1876. Among these was the conservative José Sánchez Guerra, who became the symbol of constitutional legalism —he refused to be a "monarchist of the absolute Monarchy"—. On the other hand, other politicians decided to collaborate with the dictatorship, such as the conservative Juan de la Cierva or the Maurists (José Calvo Sotelo, José Antonio Gamazo, César de la Mora or César Silió, although Antonio Maura broke with Primo de Rivera in 1924. Others, such as the conservative Gabino Bugallal, adopted a passive attitude, trusting that it would be the king himself who would put an end to the dictatorship and reestablish the validity of the Constitution.

The former members of the parties of the turn most critical of Alfonso XIII, such as Sánchez Guerra or Manuel de Burgos y Mazo, of the conservative party, or Santiago Alba, of the liberal party, joined the Constitutional Bloc founded by the reformist Melquiades Álvarez, who advocated the abdication of the king and the convocation of Constituent Courts. Others would go even further and openly join the Republican camp, such as Niceto Alcalá-Zamora and Miguel Maura Gamazo, who founded the Republican Liberal Right.

Shortly after Primo de Rivera announced on September 5, 1926, his firm intention to institutionalize his regime —"Why are we going to resurrect that artifice or contraption called Parliament? the dictator declared—, Sánchez Guerra sent a letter to the king in which he told him that the calling of the projected National Consultative Assembly would mean "the definitive rupture and the immediate removal of the Monarch, if not of the Monarchy, of all the constitutional monarchical men of Spain", an idea that he reiterated when he met with him on September 22, in San Sebastián —the Assembly meant "the definitive and total abrogation of the parliamentary regime and of the Constitution", he told him again—. For Sánchez Guerra, the convocation of the Assembly was "an illegitimate and factious act" and he promised that if this event finally took place he would exile himself from Spain, a promise he kept the following year, September 12, 1927, the same day that Alfonso XIII, after resisting for more than a year, signed the decree of convocation. In the manifesto made public by Sánchez Guerra, in which he included the letter he had sent to the king a year earlier, he proposed the calling of a Parliament through which "the sovereign nation would freely dispose of its destiny and establish the rules within which the future rulers would have to move and develop their action". Several prominent members of the "old politics" adhered to the manifesto, such as Miguel Villanueva, the Count of Romanones, Francisco Bergamín, Manuel de Burgos y Mazo, Niceto Alcalá-Zamora and Joaquín Chapaprieta. The reformist Melquiades Álvarez and some members of the Republican Alliance such as Alejandro Lerroux or Melquiades Álvarez, and even the anarchist Ángel Pestaña, also joined in. A French diplomat communicated to his government the following month, October 1927: "the feeling of hostility against the king is amplified in an incredible way". Around that time two biographies of Ferdinand VII were published, "a clear subterfuge to criticize the king and evade censorship", according to Miguel Martorell Linares. One was entitled El rey felón y los seis años inicuos (The felon king and the six iniquitous years); the other Los seis años malditos (The six cursed years).

Fifteen months after the manifesto in which he proposed the convocation of Constituent Courts without giving them that name, Sánchez Guerra led the attempted coup d'état of January 1929. If the military cost of this failed coup d'état was high, "due to the division of the Army and the strengthening of the pre-republican current in it, especially on the part of the artillerymen, the political cost was no less negligible. Most of the political leaders from the Restoration involved distanced themselves definitively from Alfonso XIII and many from the monarchy, declaring themselves not only anti-Alfonso, but openly republican". Therefore, since then "things were never the same again for the dictatorship".

=== Republicans ===
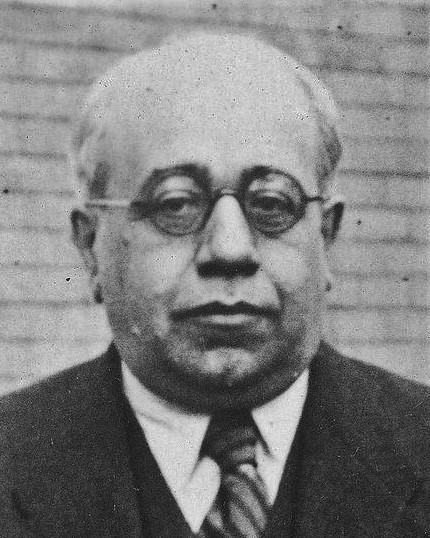
Manuel Azaña in 1932 when he was president of the government during the Second Spanish Republic.

The Republicans were strengthened by the appearance of a new party, Acción Republicana. Its promoter was Manuel Azaña, a former member of the Reformist Party of Melquiades Álvarez. Azaña, like most of the personalities who left the party after Primo de Rivera's coup d'état, had given up the reformist project of achieving democracy within the Monarchy, and was already betting on the Republic, as he stated in the manifesto Apelación a la República (Appeal to the Republic) which he made public in May 1924. To achieve it, he proposed to create "a new republican-socialist conjunction capable of opposing to the overwhelming block of the obscurantist forces, the resistance first, the counter-offensive later of the latent liberal will under the lying resignation of the country".

Azaña criticized the old republicans such as Alejandro Lerroux or Vicente Blasco Ibáñez and proposed a new republicanism. This initiative took shape in May 1925, with the birth of the so-called "Republican Action Group", which was made up of intellectuals, some of them, like Azaña, from the Reformist Party, such as Ramón Pérez de Ayala or José Giral, and others not, such as Luis Jiménez de Asúa, Luis Araquistain, Honorato de Castro or Martí y Jara.

The union between the new and the old republicanism was reached on February 11, 1926, with the foundation of the Republican Alliance, the same day in which the anniversary of the First Spanish Republic was celebrated. The old Radical Republican Party of Alejandro Lerroux and the Federal Democratic Republican Party were part of the Alliance, together with the new formations of Azaña's Republican Action and the Catalan Republican Party, founded by Marcelino Domingo and Lluís Companys.

The manifesto made public by the Republican Alliance on the same day it was created called for the convocation of "a Constituent Cortes elected by universal suffrage, in which we will fight for the proclamation of the republican regime". The manifesto was widely supported by the republican centers, some 450, which claimed to group about 100,000 people. All the signatory parties pledged to remain united until the fall of the dictatorship. The Provisional Board of the Alliance was formed by Manuel Hilario Ayuso Iglesias, Roberto Castrovido, Marcelino Domingo, Alejandro Lerroux and Manuel Azaña.

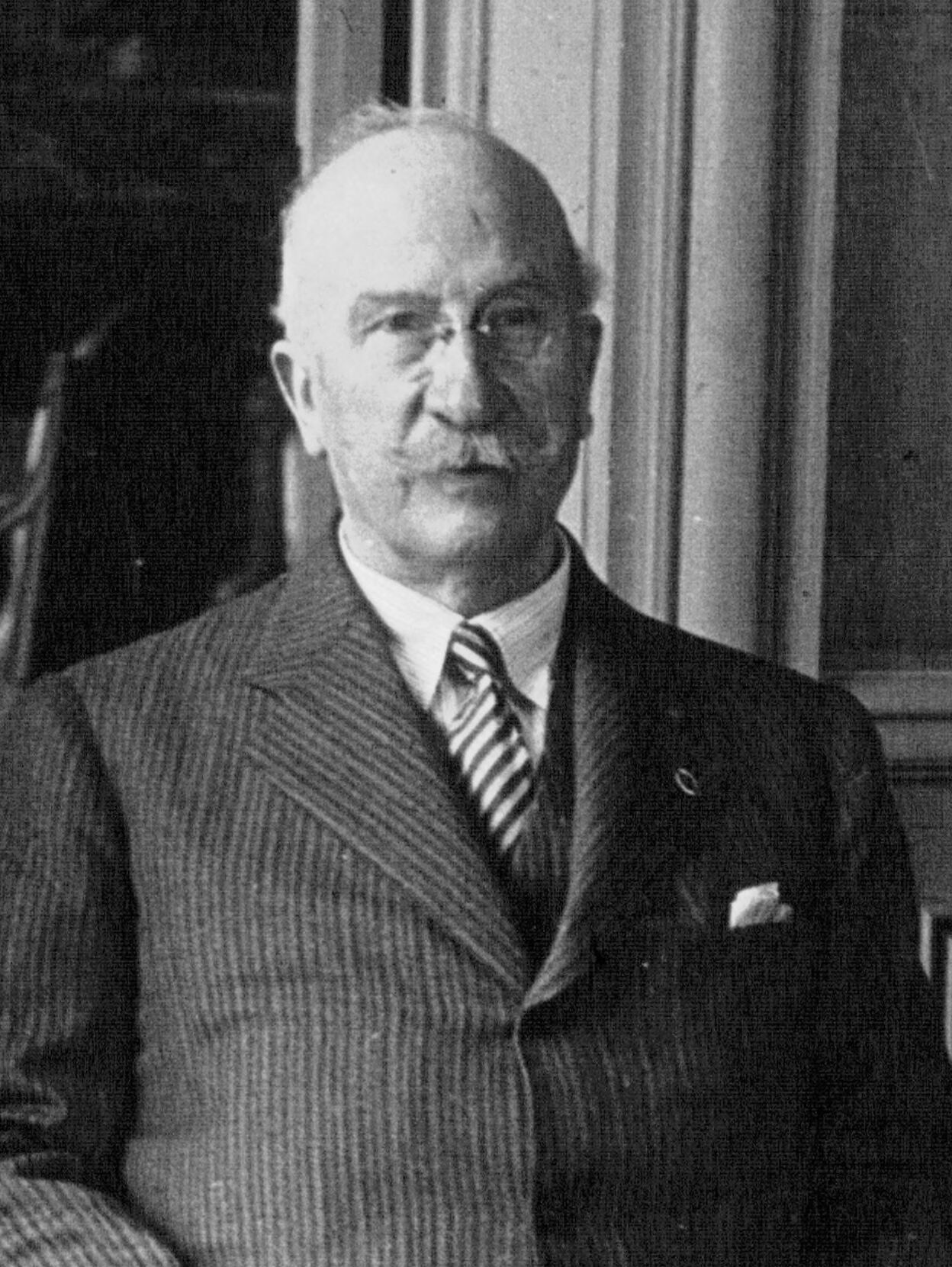
Alejandro Lerroux.

The same year of the foundation of the Republican Alliance a letter of Alejandro Lerroux was circulated in which he explained the reasons for the "painful disappointment" which had resulted from the dictatorship:

The military dictatorship, which could have and should have been a savior, a solution to so many difficult national problems, has turned out to be nothing but a painful disappointment, which has sterilely consumed the collective moral energy in which the hope of a messianic people in a providential redeemer consists. [...] Soon after the dictatorship was set in motion, it showed its incompetence, consuming the prestige with which it was surrounded, and not having been willing to submit to the King. It has not achieved independence from the Palace. At the present time, even though the directorate has been entirely depopularized, its worst enemy is the King, who constantly conspires against Primo de Rivera.

According to historian Ángeles Barrio Alonso, "the importance of the Alliance lay in the fact that it represented a renewal of republicanism capable of achieving, as was demonstrated as a result of the proclamation of the Second Spanish Republic, what had not been possible until then: to attract to the political project of the Republic a mainly urban, middle and lower middle class social base, as well as broad sectors of the workers".

The Alliance participated in the failed coup d'état of June 1926, known as the Sanjuanada. In April, the Alianza Republicana Committee met in a private home in Madrid with General Francisco Aguilera to give him its support. It also actively supported the attempted coup d'état of January 1929 led by José Sánchez Guerra. In the following months the federal republicans left the Alliance and Lerroux's Radical Party suffered a split on the left led by Álvaro de Albornoz, who was joined by Marcelino Domingo, who created the Radical-Socialist Republican Party, with a workerist, anti-clerical and secularist ideology. However, these defections did not weaken the Alliance, which in July 1929 claimed to have some 200,000 members.

According to Shlomo Ben-Ami, the growth of republicanism was closely related to the discontent of the middle classes with the dictatorship. Republicanism "began to embrace and provide a voice for the small urban bourgeoisie, for small businessmen threatened with bankruptcy by the tax burden and by the regime's favoritism towards monopolies, for merchants who had had to reduce the scope of their business because of the dictatorship's policy of high tariffs. It is revealing that the programs of most of the Republican parties spoke of free trade and the defense of small businesses, as opposed to the expansionism and protectionism of the large companies. These parties also attracted the professional classes, especially in the provinces, where teachers, doctors, engineers and lawyers found it increasingly difficult to earn a decent living, due to the constant rise in prices and, from 1929 onwards, the scarcity of new job opportunities. "Going to the pious mountain" had already become customary for middle-class housewives eager to keep up appearances of a "decent" standard of living".

=== Catalan, Basque and Galician nationalists ===
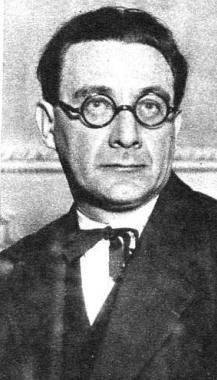
Lluís Nicolau d'Olwer, leader of Acció Catalana.

The two Catalan nationalist organizations that were most active in their opposition to the dictatorship were Acció Catalana and, above all, Estat Catalá. Regarding the former, as Montserrat Baras has pointed out, during this period "we can only speak of isolated actions by individuals or groups of notables and the maintenance of connections based mainly on personal relationships" because Acció Catalana was not strictly speaking a political party, but an aplec de patriotes ['gathering of patriots'], which also explains why its leaders acted in different ways. While its president Jaume Bofill i Mates went into voluntary exile in Paris, Lluís Nicolau d'Olwer took the "Catalan case" to the League of Nations and Antoni Rovira i Virgili, leader of the most republican and socially advanced sector, founded in 1927 a newspaper of his own, La Nau, from which a new party called Acció Republicana de Catalunya would emerge shortly after the fall of Primo de Rivera.

As for Estat Català, led by Francesc Macià, it decidedly opted for the insurrectional path, creating the escamots and raising funds for the purchase of arms. In January 1925 Macià founded in Paris the Pact of the Free Alliance, which was joined by the CNT and the Basque and Galician nationalists, creating a General Revolutionary Committee, or Action Committee, which would lead the simultaneous uprising in Catalonia and the Basque Country.

In June 1925, clandestine groups of Estat Catalá and Acció Catalana organized the so-called Garraf plot, a failed attempt against the kings of Spain in the railroad tunnels of the Garraf coast through which the train that was to take them to Barcelona was to pass.

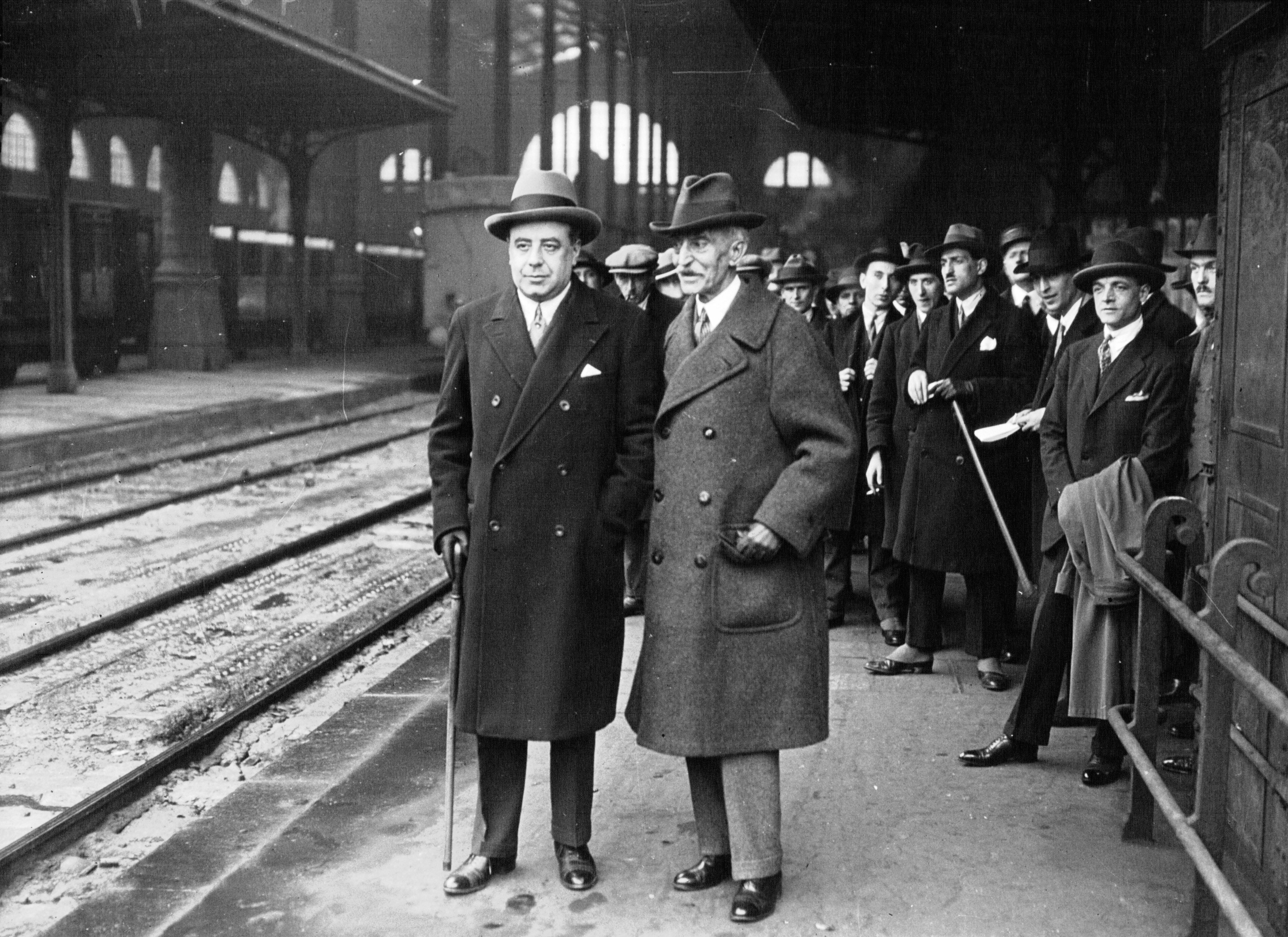
Francesc Macià (right) with his lawyer (left) about to leave Paris after the trial for the failed plot of Prats de Molló.

After the failure of the Sanjuanada coup d'état of June 1926, Macià set in motion the planned invasion of Catalonia by a small army composed of escamots that after crossing the border through Prats de Molló, would take Olot and then fall on Barcelona, where simultaneously the general strike would be declared, and with the collaboration of a part of the garrison the Catalan Republic would be proclaimed.

But the so-called Prats de Molló plot was a disaster because one of the participants, the Italian Riciotti Garibaldi, was a double agent of Mussolini, who alerted Primo de Rivera. So the French police, who were also on the alert, had little difficulty in arresting near the Spanish border, between November 2 and 4, most of the men engaged in the invasion (115). Macià was also arrested and taken with seventeen others involved to Paris for trial. The trial was held in January 1927, and they were condemned to very light prison sentences and banished to Belgium.

The plot and the trial had a wide international echo which gave "origin to the persistent myth of l'Avi [Macià], precisely at the moment of lowest popularity of the dictatorship and its accomplices in Catalonia". Macià developed from then on a feverish propaganda activity for the "Catalan cause", especially in Latin America, which culminated in Cuba, where in October 1928, he convened a self-styled Constituent Assembly of Catalan Separatism, from which the Partit Separatista Revolucionari Català would emerge and where the Provisional Constitution of the Catalan Republic was approved.

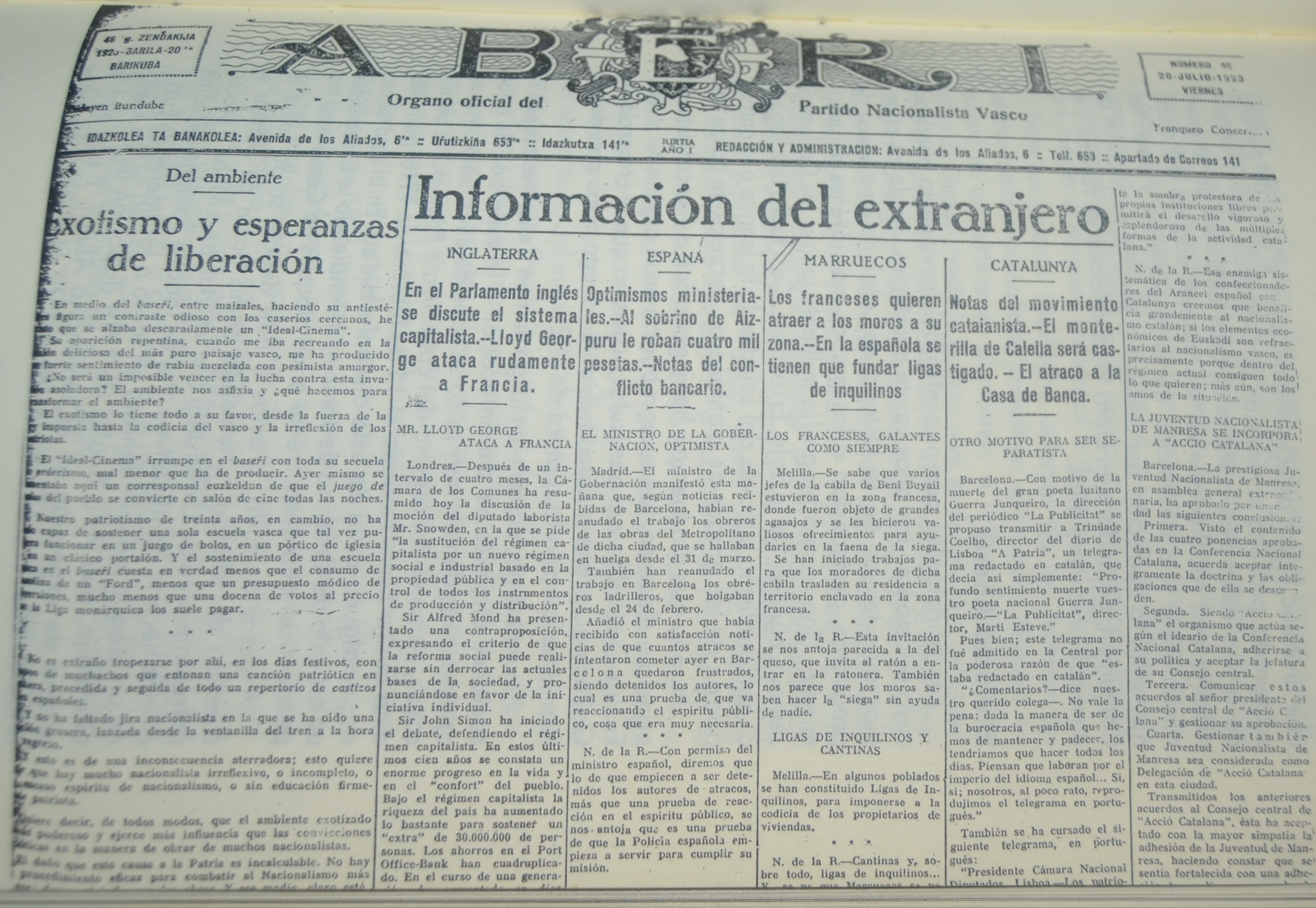
Cover of July 20, 1923 of the Aberri newspaper, official organ of the Basque Nationalist Party.

As for the Basque nationalists, the most radical Aberrian sector which then controlled the Basque Nationalist Party (PNV) and which was the most harshly persecuted by the dictatorship —while the moderates of the Basque Nationalist Communion were relatively tolerated—, opted like Estat Català for the insurrectional path. In November 1924, twelve Aberrians met in Ordizia with the Irish activist Ambrosse Martin, but they were all arrested, the same thing happened to the leader of the Aberrians Elías Gallastegui when on May 3, 1925, he led an act of nationalist affirmation, although he finally managed to flee to the French Basque Country, where at the end of the year he founded a Committee for Basque Independence, which published the newspaper Lenago Il ('First to Die'), self-titled Official Organ of the Basque Volunteer Army. Like the Catalan nationalists, the Aberrians also presented the "Basque case" before international organizations and participated in the Pact of the Free Alliance promoted by Macià. An operation was planned which consisted of the landing in Bilbao of 300 armed combatants who would carry out an uprising like the one in Dublin in 1916. On the other hand, the Basque gudaris did not participate in the Prats de Molló plot. Gallastegui, like Macià, made a trip through Latin America and the United States touring the Basque centers. In Mexico he founded the magazine Patria Vasca, in Argentina he launched the newspaper Nación Vasca and in New York he edited Aberri again.

Conservative Galician nationalism headed by Vicente Risco and Antonio Losada had welcomed the arrival of the dictatorship with certain hopes, but when they were pressured to join the single party of the dictatorship, the Patriotic Union, both Risco and Losada moved to the ranks of the opposition. However, the Irmandades da Fala only began to act in 1928. The following year the Irmandade da Fala de A Coruña led by Antonio Villar Ponte joined the republicans of Santiago Casares Quiroga, which would lead to the creation of the ORGA after the fall of the dictatorship.

=== Socialists (and communists) ===
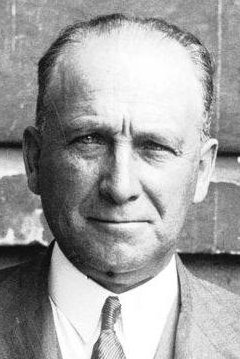
Francisco Largo Caballero (1927).

Collaboration with the dictatorship fractured Spanish socialism between those in favor of it —led by Francisco Largo Caballero, Julián Besteiro and Manuel Llaneza— and those opposed to it —led by Indalecio Prieto and Teodomiro Menéndez—. When, on October 25, 1925, Francisco Largo Caballero took possession of a seat on the Council of State, as a member of the Labor Council which had absorbed the Institute of Social Reforms, the rift deepened because that same day Indalecio Prieto resigned from his position on the executive committee of the PSOE in protest.

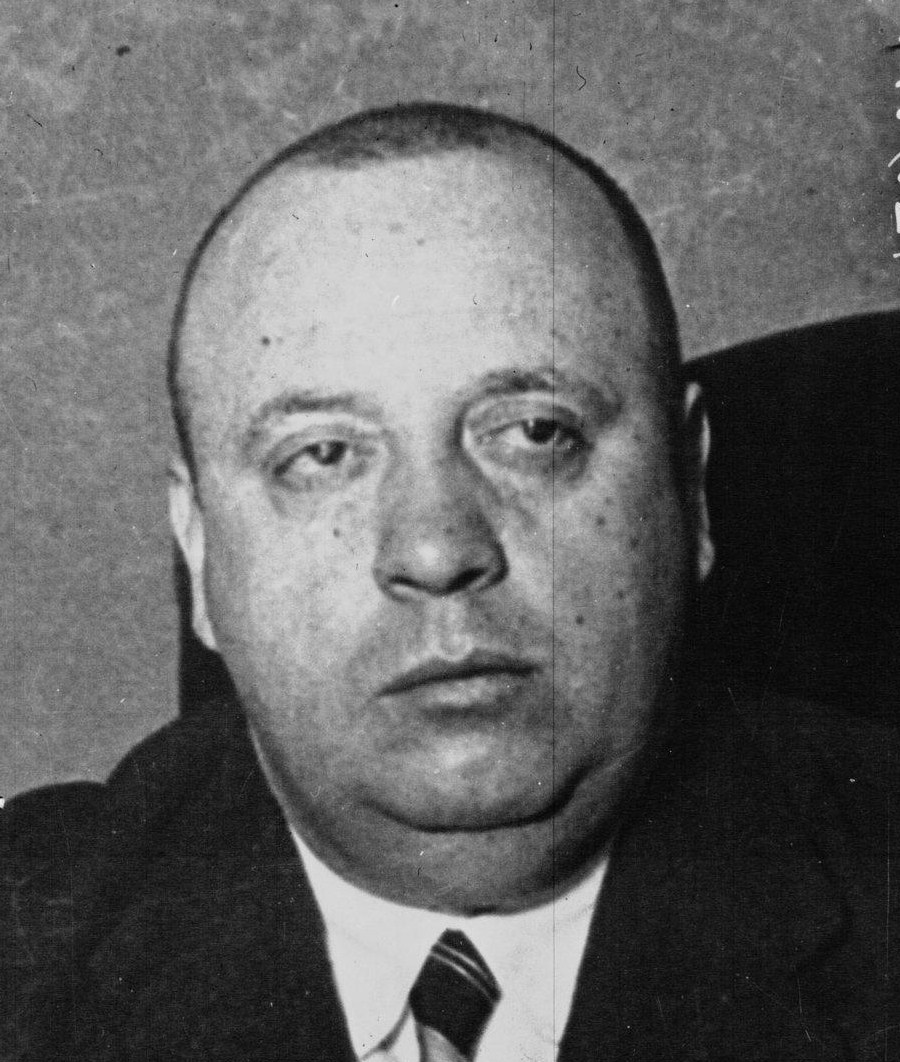
Indalecio Prieto in 1936.

After the UGT joined the National Corporate Organization created in November 1926, the internal debate was reopened on the occasion of the invitation made by Primo de Rivera to the socialists to participate in the National Consultative Assembly which was to debate a new draft of the Constitution. Now it was a clearly political collaboration, and the sector opposed to participation headed by Indalecio Prieto managed to impose itself in the Extraordinary Congresses of the PSOE and UGT on October 7–8, 1927, so the socialists announced that they would not attend the National Consultative Assembly, which caused Primo de Rivera deep disappointment and constituted a fundamental step in the distancing of the socialists from the dictatorship.

The definitive break with the dictatorship took place in 1929 on the occasion of the draft of the new corporative and authoritarian Constitution presented by the National Consultative Assembly on July 6. Both the PSOE and the UGT rejected it and demanded an authentically democratic Constitution, which they believed was only possible with the advent of the Republic. In a last attempt to integrate the Socialists into his project, Primo de Rivera offered them five seats in the Assembly designated by them, but the Socialists rejected them in a manifesto entitled A la opinión pública made public on August 13. Largo Caballero, who had distanced himself from Julián Besteiro —who continued to defend collaboration—, proclaimed the will to "realize our aims to a republican state of freedom and democracy, where we can reach the fullness of political power that corresponds to our growing social power". After the fall of the dictatorship, the PSOE and the UGT joined the Pact of San Sebastian from which emerged the "revolutionary committee" that after the proclamation of the Second Spanish Republic in April 1931 became the Provisional Government of the Second Spanish Republic, which had three socialist ministers.

For its part, the Communist Party of Spain, unlike the PSOE, positioned itself from the first moment against the dictatorship, although due to its limited strength, the arrest of some of its leaders was enough to deactivate it inside the country. Abroad, its activity was centered in Paris, where they carried out acts of protest on the occasion of Primo de Rivera's visit to the French capital on July 14, 1926. Together with the French communists they published two manifestos entitled Against Fascism and For Freedom.

=== Anarcho-syndicalists ===
The relentless repression to which the dictatorship subjected the CNT —it was outlawed in May 1924— gave rise to an internal debate between syndicalists such as Joan Peiró and Ángel Pestaña, who advocated seeking formulas that would allow the CNT to act within the law, and the "pure" anarchists like Diego Abad de Santillán and Emilio López Arango, who accused Peiró and Pestaña of being "reformists" and who defended "direct action" and the revolutionary spontaneism of the masses. The latter found broad support among the cenetistas exiled in France, who in February 1924 constituted in Paris a Committee of Anarchist Relations which proposed the assault on the State by means of a "Revolutionary Army", for which they were nicknamed by the syndicalists with the derisive nickname of "anarcho-bolsheviks".

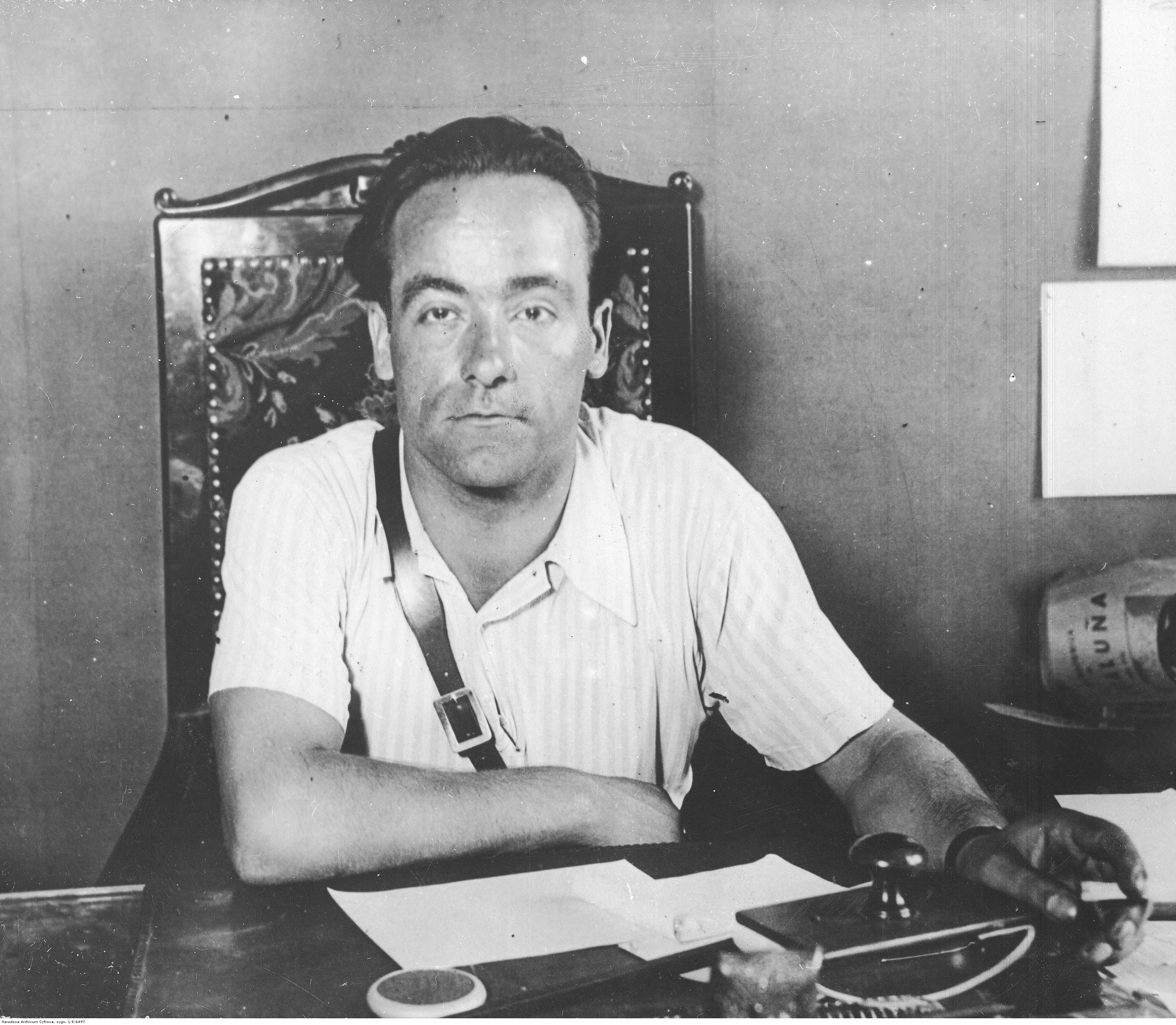
The anarchist Juan García Oliver in 1936 when he was Minister of Justice in the government of the Second Republic at the beginning of the civil war. During the dictatorship of Primo de Rivera he defended "direct action" to overthrow it.

The first "direct action" was an attempted invasion of Spain from France through Vera de Bidasoa (Navarra) and the Catalan border, which took place in early November 1924, and which was accompanied by an attempted assault on the Atarazanas Barracks and the Artillery Headquarters in Barcelona. The two operations turned out to be a complete failure, because apparently the Spanish police were informed of them. On November 7, there was an armed confrontation in Vera de Bidasoa in which two civil guards, a carabinero and three insurrectionists were killed, and three more were wounded. Fourteen revolutionaries were arrested, and the rest managed to flee to Hendaye, where the Gendarmerie arrested twenty Spaniards and one Frenchman. As for the group that was to invade Spain through Catalonia, led by Francisco Ascaso and Juan García Oliver, it was intercepted by the Gendarmerie, which had been alerted by the Spanish police. When they tried to cross the border 22 insurrectionists were arrested, while the rest managed to escape. The anarchist leaders who managed to flee left France and sought refuge in Belgium or Latin America. The latter was the destination of Francisco Ascaso and Buenaventura Durruti, "Los Errantes", where they developed "an extensive work of anarchist propaganda plagued with violent actions bordering on common crime".

The failure of the Vera de Bidasoa attempt opened the debate on the participation of the CNT in political conspiracies to overthrow the dictatorship, which deepened the differences between the syndicalists and the "pure" anarchists. In the first discussion that took place in the National Congress held clandestinely in Barcelona in April 1925, the former won when the proposal of collaboration "with as many forces tending to the destruction of the current regime by violent means" was approved, although with the proviso that "these pacts do not imply that commitments of any kind are contracted to limit the scope and development of the revolution which, at all times, we must promote to its radical and positive extremes". The result of this agreement was the entry of the CNT into the Libre Alianza created by the Catalan nationalist leader Francesc Macià and which would organize the frustrated plot of Prats de Molló.

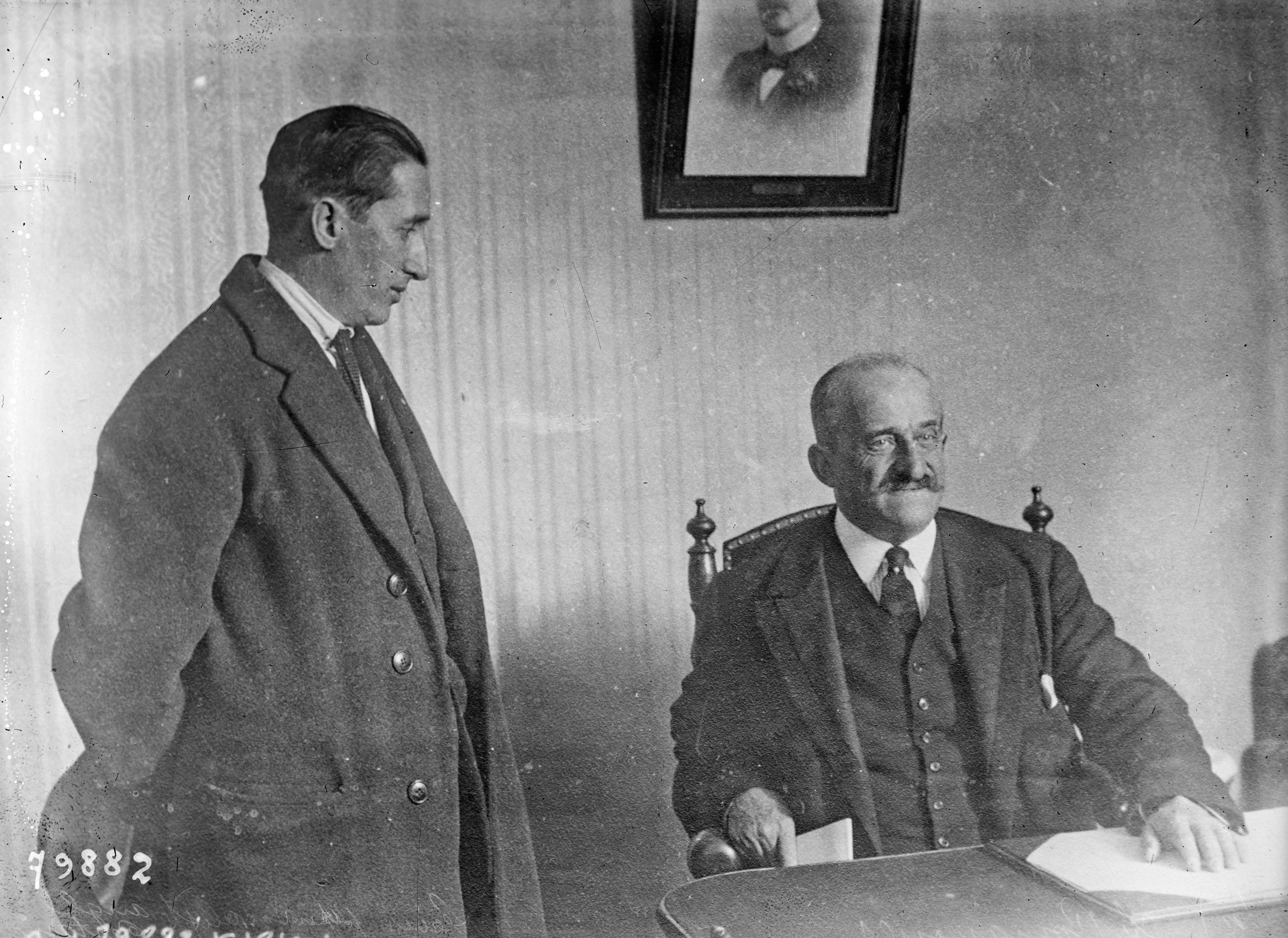
Ángel Pestaña, defender of the "syndicalist way", in 1922 together with the liberal politician Count of Romanones (right).

In 1927 the rupture of the syndicalist sector began when Ángel Pestaña proposed as a mean to recover legality to participate in the elections for the Joint Committees of the recently created by the dictatorship National Corporate Organization, in which the workers' representation was being monopolized by the UGT, but the proposal was rejected by the majority headed by Joan Peiró, since it broke with the "apolitical" principles that defined the CNT since its foundation. The rupture between Peiró and Pestaña was consummated when the latter founded in Barcelona, in October 1929, a Local Union of Trade Unions and Workers' Associations located outside the CNT's Local Federation of Single Unions of Barcelona, and also approached Catalan nationalists and republicans to form an anti-dictatorial front. The rupture did not last long because the resignation of Primo de Rivera in January 1930 prevented Pestaña's organization from participating in the OCN, and so in March he and Peiró reconciled.

The fracture in the syndicalist sector favored the growth of the "pure" anarchist sector which defended the organic coordination between the CNT and the anarchist organizations. Specifically Diego Abad de Santillán in his work El anarquismo en el movimiento obrero (1925) proposed resorting to the tactic of "trabazón" applied by the Argentine FORA —which consisted in the establishment of liaison bodies between the workers' unions and the specifically anarchist groups— to ensure libertarian predominance in the CNT. The specific organization of anarchist character that would apply in Spain the tactic of "interlocking" was the FAI.

The Iberian Anarchist Federation (FAI) was founded in Valencia on July 24–26, 1927, from the fusion of the Uniâo Anarquista Portuguesa, the Federación Nacional de grupos Anarquistas de España and the Federación de grupos Anarquistas de Lengua Española, founded in France for the organization of the exiled cenetistas (exiled cenetistas). The FAI advocated the establishment of forms of organic representation of the FAI in the governing bodies of the CNT —the trabazón— to ensure the anarcho-consyndicalist character of the Confederation. According to historian Eduardo González Calleja, "the declared objective was the conversion of the FAI into the inspiring vanguard of the union" so "its members acted as shock militants, and met in "affinity groups" of three to ten members, organized on a federal scale parallel to the CNT, with which they coordinated through the committees of relations and the mistos [CNT-FAI] committees of action".

Following the tactic of "trabazón", the FAI controlled the Action Committee of the CNT based in Badalona, which came into conflict with the National Committee presided by Peiró and based in Mataró, because the FAI proposed to launch an insurrectionary movement on its own, counting on the support of some like-minded military officers such as Captain Fermín Galán, while the National Committee was in favor of participating in the conspiracy headed by the conservative José Sánchez Guerra, which would culminate in the attempted coup d'état of January 1929. The failure of the coup forced the National Committee to resign, being replaced by an informal National Committee formed by Pestaña.

== Response of the dictatorship: increased repression. ==
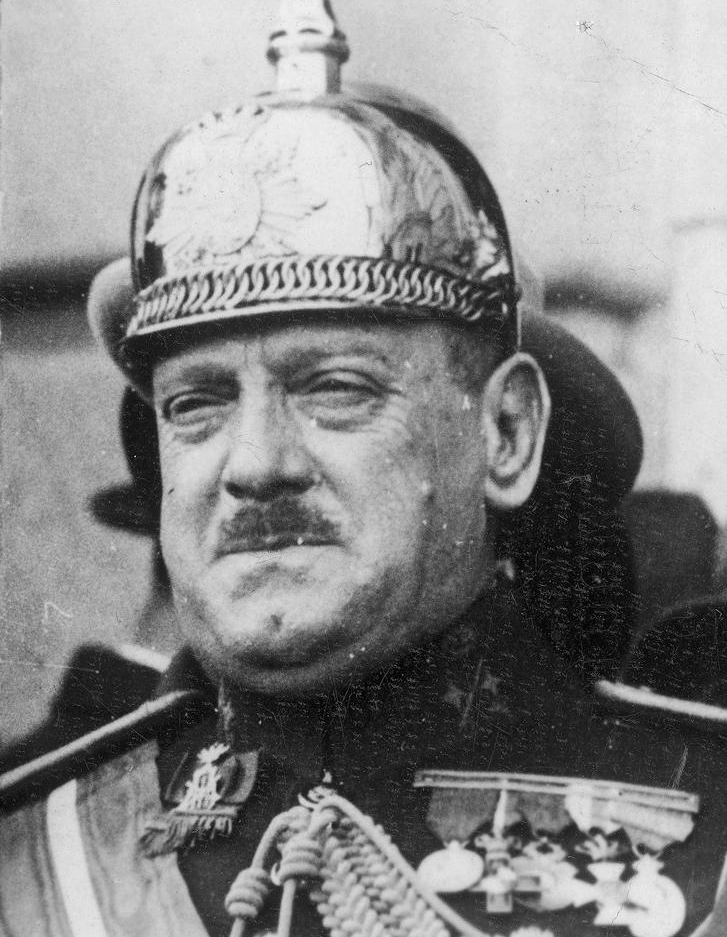
General Severiano Martínez Anido, Minister of the Interior and Primo de Rivera's right-hand man, directed the repressive policy of the regime, applying the same "resolute" methods as those he had employed during the "social war" in Catalonia (1919-1923) from his post as civil governor of Barcelona.

The dictatorship restructured and expanded the police service, whose budget increased considerably, and took special care of police action abroad, which was coordinated by the ambassador in Paris, since most of the Spanish exiles and refugees lived in France. Ambassador José María Quiñones de León, in addition to pressuring the French authorities to deport them, such as Francesc Macià, and to obtain the collaboration of the Sûreté, created a propaganda office in Paris.

After the Sanjuanada, a Royal Decree published on July 3, 1926, granted the dictator discretionary powers to impose "the sanctions that are within his powers and proposing to me those that exceed it, including the banishments and deportations that he deems necessary, whatever their number and the quality of the persons who deserve it", with no other limit than "that which the circumstances and the good of the country indicate and his righteousness and patriotism inspire him". It was also established that those sanctioned could not appeal to the courts of justice.

On June 17, 1928, another Royal Decree imposed the permission of the governmental authority for the celebration of political acts, which was accompanied by arbitrary confinements, exorbitant fines and violations of correspondence.

The new Penal Code approved in September 1928, and which would be repealed by the Second Spanish Republic, included in the crime of rebellion strikes and work stoppages, as well as considered as an attack on authority the aggression against members of the Somatén, even if they were not exercising the functions of their office.

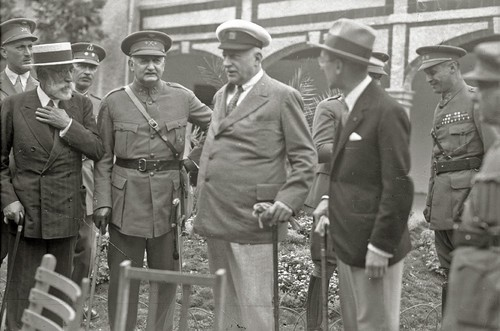
Primo de Rivera in San Sebastian in 1927.

On December 22, 1928, the last remaining legal obstacles to the government's complete control of the judiciary were removed. From then on the civil directorate could "separate, dismiss, suspend or transfer magistrates, judges and judicial officials without the need for files or prior report, and without the possibility of appeal or recourse", says Eduardo Gonzalez Calleja.

After the failed coup d'état led by Sánchez Guerra in January 1929, the civil directorate toughened repressive measures. A few days later, on February 4, it created a Special Tribunal linked to the General Directorate of Security, which virtually placed judicial power in the hands of the government. The Tribunal would be presided over by a military judge and would investigate cases affecting the security of the State, and could open rapid indictments for crimes of conspiracy, rebellion, etc., which meant in practice that the government could, for example, suspend from employment and salary those civil servants who were hostile to the regime. The creation of the Special Court was accompanied by a Circular of the Presidency of the government of February 8, which empowered the police to supervise conversations or acts that could lead to disturbances of public order, gave police tasks to the Patriotic Union and the Somatén, and it threatened with government fines of up to 25,000 pesetas and fourteen-day detentions to "any person who in a public place predicted evils for the country or censured the ministers of the Crown or high authorities for purposes of defamation or undermining their authority and prestige". Likewise, a registry of officials would be created in which, among other things, would appear if "with publicity and scandal, they manifest themselves as enemies of the regime and seek to discredit and undermine it". Finally, press censorship was made even more restrictive, expressly prohibiting any type of criticism of the government's administration, and newspapers were obliged to insert the "unofficial notes" of the civil directorate.

In April 1929, a draft Law of Public Order was discussed, which expanded the discretionary powers of the government to suppress constitutional guarantees, to proceed with arrests and searches without a warrant, as well as the expulsion of dangerous foreigners, and to declare a state of war. This reform was opposed by the king, which, according to González Calleja, "precipitated Primo's resignation in January 1930".

== Progressive deterioration of relations with the king. ==
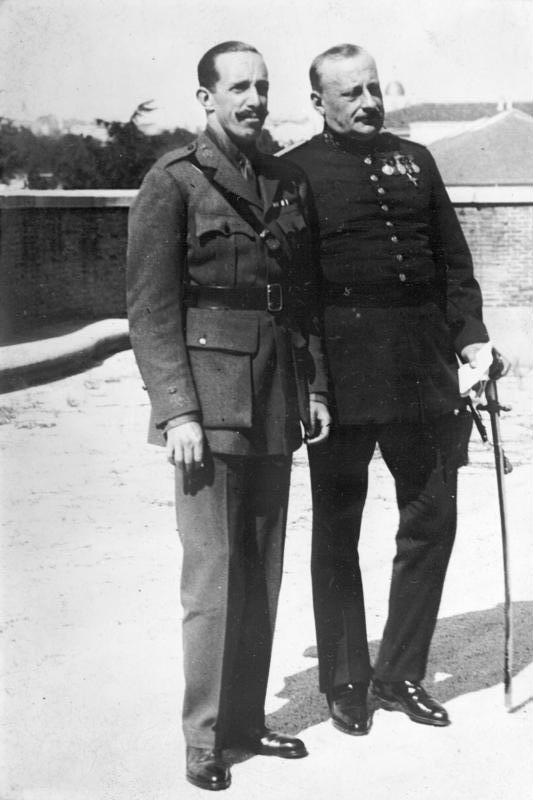
King Alfonso XIII and the dictator Miguel Primo de Rivera. Relations between the two deteriorated from 1927 onwards.

As Alejandro Quiroga has pointed out, "the tensions between the monarch and the dictator were a determining factor in the end of the Primo Rivera regime". According to Javier Moreno Luzón, "after the regenerative and imperialist euphoria of the early days, [Alfonso XIII] felt the need to find a legal solution to the state of exception. Or, what was the same, to walk towards normality". José Luis Gómez-Navarro has pointed out that "Alfonso XIII's position before the primorriverist regime and with the dictator himself went through different stages". A first one that extends until the beginning of 1924 during which "Alfonso XIII is enthusiastic about the regime, in which he sees the possibility of realizing his thoughts and desires". A second one, from the first months of 1924 to the beginning of 1926, in which the monarch continued to give "total support to the regime and its most important policies", "although without the initial overflowing enthusiasm". A third, beginning in December 1925, in which "the king continued to support the dictatorship, but without ardent and enthusiastic defenses, while marking distances and gently pressuring it to "restore normality". The fourth and last stage, in which Alfonso XIII proposed to "get rid of the dictator", began after the failed coup d'état of January 1929.

The first serious confrontation between Alfonso XIII and General Primo de Rivera took place in 1927 on the occasion of the creation of the National Consultative Assembly, to which the king was initially opposed, but which he finally accepted and signed the decree of convocation in September, after having resisted for more than a year, aware that it meant the definitive break with the Constitution of 1876 which he had sworn to fulfill and enforce —hence the nickname of "the perjured king" which began to spread—. "From then on, and until the beginning of 1929, Alfonso XIII would support the dictatorship in a "passive" way, with a high degree of complicity between the monarch and the dictator on the ideological level, but with a gradual distancing on the personal level". The distancing of the king became evident on September 13, 1928, when Alfonso XIII did not attend the multitudinous commemoration of the fifth anniversary of the "movement" that started the dictatorship.

A new clash occurred at the beginning of February 1929, when the king, advised by his mother María Cristina de Habsburgo, resisted signing the decree granting extraordinary powers to the Government, the somatén and the single party Patriotic Union for the repression of "subversive" activities after the failed coup d'état of the previous month led by Sánchez-Guerra. Three days after he signed the decree, María Cristina died, which deeply affected the king. Javier Tusell and Genoveva García Queipo de Llano have pointed out, on the other hand, that the failed coup d'état gave Alfonso XIII "the definitive sensation that the weakness of the regime was patent and that important questions about the future were opening up. The dictator could gamble his political destiny, but the King had every reason to see confirmed from that moment on the imminent dangers that his Crown was undergoing".

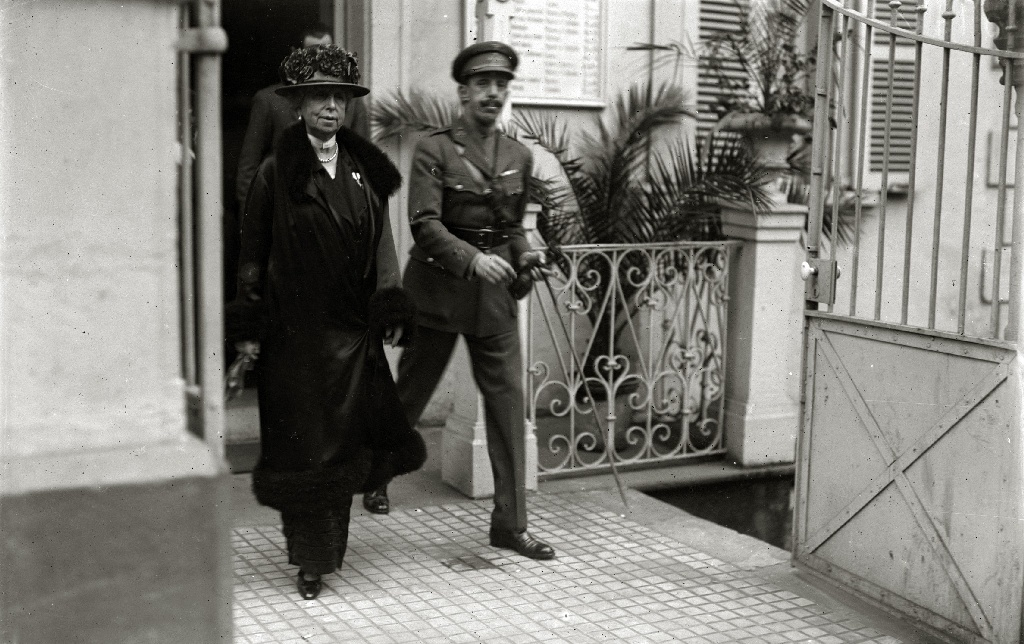
Alfonso XIII with his mother María Cristina de Habsburgo in 1924. Maria Cristina repeatedly advised her son on political matters. Her death, on February 6, 1929, was a hard blow for the king.

The next confrontation between Alfonso XIII and Primo de Rivera occurred only two weeks later when the king opposed the dissolution of the artillery corps and the application of severe sanctions to its chiefs and officers, who had confronted Primo de Rivera over the question of promotions. After a bitter discussion in the Council of Ministers presided over by the monarch, Alfonso XIII compromised again and signed the decree dated February 19, 1929. "Once again, the confrontation ended with Primo's victory. However, relations between the two had been deteriorating, to the point that the king began to think that the dictator did not have the support of the army nor that of popular opinion.... To cap it all, the acquittal of Sánchez Guerra by a military court gave an idea that sectors of the army no longer supported the dictatorship. All this must have convinced the king of the convenience of getting rid of the dictator".

"In the autumn of 1929 the dictatorial regime had clearly shown its incapacity to fulfill the two conditions for which the king had supported it. In the first place, it had ceased to be a strong government. Public order problems were occurring (uprisings in Ciudad Real and Valencia, new student conflicts, etc.). Secondly, the government was incapable of agreeing on the draft of the new Constitution and on the methods of approving it. The king, aware that Primo and his regime had less and less support in the army and in public opinion, withdrew his support". The British ambassador communicated to his government at the end of 1929: "The only substantial power in which country that has not been annulled, that of the king, is increasing to the same extent that that of the dictator is diminishing".

== Final collapse ==
=== From August 1929 to January 1930 ===
According to Javier Tusell and Genoveva García Queipo de Llano, "the final decline of the dictatorial regime dates back to the summer of 1929". In August, in response to the harsh criticism of the draft Constitution presented the previous month by the National Constituent Assembly, Primo de Rivera, who had not liked the project very much either, proposed to debate a consensual solution to the dictatorship within the Assembly, to which he requested the incorporation of personalities from the "old politics", representatives of the Royal Academies, the Universities and the Bar Associations, and the UGT, but all of them refused to participate, which, according to Eduardo González Calleja, "broke all the bridges for an institutional solution to the dictatorship" and accentuated "the terminal crisis of the regime". Furthermore, by questioning the preliminary draft of the Constitution "Primo was putting his regime in a dead end", pointed out Alejandro Quiroga.

In October, the military court acquitted José Sánchez Guerra, for having led the coup d'état in January, arguing that his actions had been lawful because they were directed against an illegal regime. "Primo flew into a rage. He knew the damage that in the eyes of broad sectors of public opinion the acquittal of Sánchez Guerra was doing to his regime, by showing that the Marquis of Estella was incapable of punishing those who rose up against the dictatorship. To curb the image of weakness, he declared then that he would remain in power until the culmination of his "work". In an official note he affirmed: "No deadlines, therefore, and, for the moment, a halt in the march towards normalization". Javier Tusell and Genoveva García Queipo de Llano attach great importance to "the sentence that exonerated Sánchez Guerra of any responsibility for his uprising" because "it made the regime illegitimate".

According to Shlomo Ben-Ami, "the last months of the dictatorship were the agony of a bewildered dictator". "Overwhelmed by the accumulating difficulties, the dictator definitively lost confidence in himself and consequently formed a series of confused and often contradictory transition plans", but "none found a favorable reception". Primo's objective was to "pass power in an orderly manner" and "that [the] legacy and institutions of the dictatorship be respected". Javier Tusell and Genoveva García Queipo de Llano have affirmed that "the collapse of the dictatorship would not have taken place had it not been for its own strategic confusion, to which was added, in the final stretch, the pure and simple desire, almost physical, of Primo de Rivera to abandon power by any means necessary". However, Alejandro Quiroga has warned that "the dictator never specified when he was going to leave". As late as November 26, he declared that "the moment has not yet arrived". "It would be weakness and desertion improper of men who accepted to govern under very difficult conditions... to allow themselves to be impressed and depressed by clandestine small talk emanating from discontented sectors, stubborn in rebellion, which neither in quantity nor in quality represent a hundredth part of the Spanish people", he added. Alejandro Quiroga points out: "Now, unlike in previous years, the possibility of Primo abandoning power began to become more real in 1929, simply because the diabetes suffered by the dictator worsened".

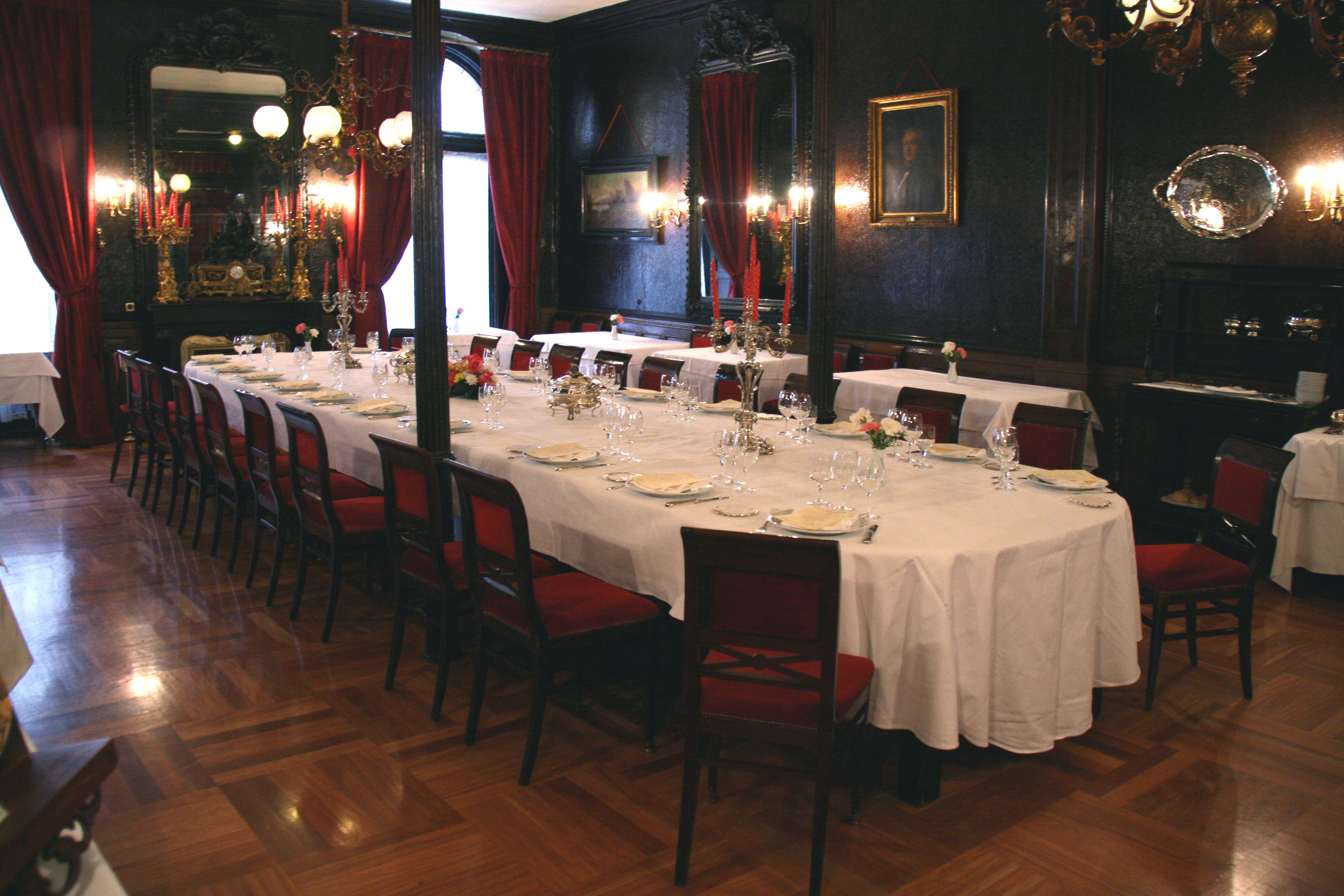
Lounge of the Lhardy restaurant where Primo de Rivera met with his government in early December 1929, to agree on the transition plan that would be named after the restaurant, located on Carrera de San Jerónimo in Madrid.

His final transition plan was discussed at a government working dinner, also attended by the president of the National Consultative Assembly José Yanguas Messía, held at the Lhardy restaurant on December 3, in commemoration of the fourth anniversary of the constitution of the Civil Directory. There Primo de Rivera confirmed his intention to propose to the king the appointment of a transitional government, which would be "neither dictatorial nor constitutional", presided over by a civilian "of a right-wing cut", who could be Count Guadalhorce, although he did not rule out remaining in power himself. Primo explained to them his plan "which involved the reopening of the National Assembly in January, the prompt holding of municipal elections, which would be followed by provincial elections, with the certainty that the Patriotic Union would win in both, and in the autumn of 1930 other elections for the formation of a unicameral semi-corporate Parliament". The plan was leaked to the press, which opened a debate on when the dictator would leave, which "did not please" Primo de Rivera, who declared that he would remain in his post "whatever it took" until a "serious and reassuring" situation was re-established.

In the midst of this controversy, a banquet was held on the night of December 7, the eve of the patron saint of the infantry weapon, presided over by the king and Primo de Rivera, during which the military who attended treated the dictator coldly, which, according to Alejandro Quiroga, "did not go unnoticed by Alfonso XIII, who understood that the dictatorship had lost much of the support of the Army and public opinion", nor by Primo de Rivera. "The king then turned to the old politicians looking for a replacement for the Marquis of Estella, but they refused to offer a solution without a prior convocation of the Cortes".

On December 31, 1929, the Council of Ministers presided by the king debated the "Lhardy plan", but "Alfonso XIII asked for a few days to reflect..., which meant a tacit withdrawal of the royal confidence and the official opening of the last crisis of the regime", says González Calleja. José Calvo Sotelo, Minister of Finance, later wrote: "On that day the death sentence of the dictatorship was signed". According to Shlomo Ben-Ami, during the meeting of the Council of Ministers, the king "could not fail to notice that he was faced with an incoherent government, led by a bewildered dictator, who was presenting him with a plan made up of patches. The monarch also noticed that, in spite of the facade of solidarity they were trying to present, the ministers did not support Lhardy's plan or, at least, they were divided about it".

Primo de Rivera after the Council of Ministers with the king declared:

The aristocratic classes... hate me... The conservatives refuse to join the dictatorship... Those who maintain more affinities with the Church neither assist the dictatorship nor applaud its purposes... And the banking and industries because they pay... more strictly the taxes.... The employers' class because the dictatorship is interested in ensuring that the workers do not lack welfare laws or social justice..., the civil servants (because they are required to be more punctual)..., as well as other sectors..., do not warmly support the dictatorship..., they unconsciously join those who say that it is already old, that it is exhausted.

Around the same time, a military conspiracy to overthrow the dictatorship began to take form, which had its epicenter in Andalusia and was taking place almost in the public light. The conspiracy was led by the same constitutionalist committee presided over by Miguel Villanueva that had organized the failed coup d'état of January 1929. They counted on General Manuel Goded, military governor of Cadiz, who was ready for a "repetition of the march of Alcolea" which was to begin in Cadiz on February 15, and also with the acquiescence of King Alfonso XIII, who, as Gonzalez Calleja has pointed out, "had finally understood that getting rid of Primo as soon as possible was the only chance he had to save his own situation and that of the Monarchy". In fact, on January 18, Prince Carlos de Borbón, Captain General of Andalusia and a good friend of General Goded, asked his cousin to dismiss Primo de Rivera —and this in turn asked the King to accept his relief because he considered him an accomplice of the "Andalusian conspiracy", which Alfonso XIII refused—. The same thing was said to the King by the son of Count de Romanones sent by the latter, in order to stop the coup which was being prepared and whose consequences were unpredictable.

On January 21, the Minister of Finance José Calvo Sotelo resigned due to the resounding failure of his monetary and financial policy. Primo de Rivera replaced him with the Count of the Andes, a man of the King's confidence, in an attempt to regain the support of the monarch, but he did not succeed. The following day, January 22, a new strike began in all the universities, which already had a markedly republican character and was supported by the unions. Three days later, on January 25 at 9:30 in the evening, Primo de Rivera declared to the journalists he had summoned to his office: "I assure you that what I am not willing to do is to have power taken away from me, more than anything else, and above all considerations, because of the symptom of anarchic decomposition that this would reveal". A few hours later he drafted the consultation with the Army and the Navy on his continuity in power. At that moment Primo de Rivera knew that the insurrection that General Goded was going to lead had been brought forward to January 28. Or between February 5 and 8.

=== Sunday, January 26 ===
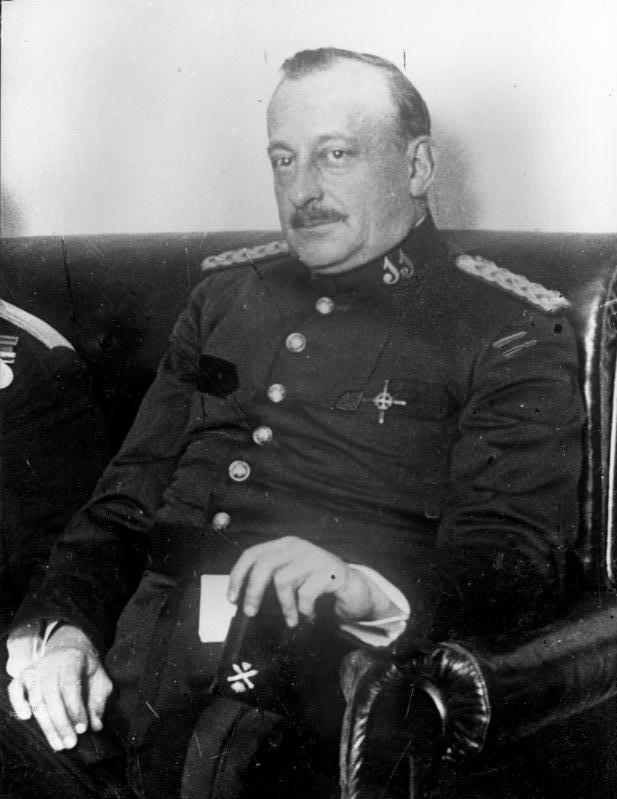
Primo de Rivera around 1930.

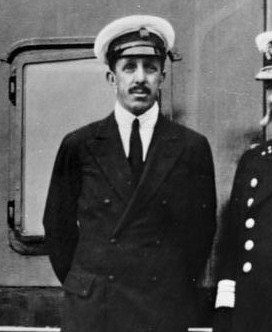
Alfonso XIII in 1930.

On January 26, 1930, Primo de Rivera made a last attempt to stop the coup that was being prepared against him, and whose date Goded had brought forward, and also to face the pressure of Alfonso XIII to resign. That day he announced by means of an "unofficial note" that he was going to consult the ten general captains (and the chiefs of the three maritime departments and of the Moroccan forces and the directors of the Civil Guard, Carabinieri and Invalides), so that they could evaluate the work of the dictatorship and so that with their authority they could settle the "high and low intrigues" that were taking place at that time. They had to make a "brief, discreet and reserved exploration" among his chiefs of units and services to let him know if he still "deserved the confidence and good concept of the Army and Navy". If the answer was negative, Primo would return "the powers of the head of the dictatorship and the Government" to Alfonso XIII.

According to Eduardo Gonzalez Calleja, "the famous survey to the Army was a false step in several aspects. In the first place, it was a tacit recognition that the ultimate legitimacy of the regime remained in the Army, not in ghostly popular plebiscites or in pseudo-parliamentary fictions. Secondly, it placed the Armed Forces, beset by a serious crisis of internal discipline, in the uncomfortable position of having to judge the work and legality of a regime that had survived almost exclusively thanks to its institutional support. In the third instance, it was a final snub to the king, who had provoked the crisis of confidence, but who, as in September 1923, was placed before a fait accompli that nullified his power of arbitration, which had disappeared de facto with the rupture of the constitutional consensus". This last consideration is shared by Shlomo Ben-Ami: "Primo de Rivera's appeal to the generals was an impossible attempt at a counter-coup, this time against the king. Primo de Rivera's claim that the opinion of the military had been the source of his elevation to power was an affront to the crown and a violation of the political framework in which the sovereign was the supreme source of power". It is also shared by Alejandro Quiroga —"Primo appealed directly to the high command of the Army, whom he recognized as the only legitimate instance of his dictatorship, and deprived the king of his power to dismiss him"— and by Javier Moreno Luzón —"this maneuver was intolerable for Don Alfonso, since by including another decision-making instance he called into question the royal prerogative of liberty"—.

While waiting for the response of his fellow generals, Primo de Rivera met with the king around three o'clock in the afternoon, although the meeting did not transcend and it is not known what they talked about. According to Alejandro Quiroga, it is probable that the dictator "tried to calm the anger of Alfonso XII, who realized perfectly well what the movement of the Marquis of Estella implied. The monarch understood that Primo was striking a "blow" against his ability to appoint and dismiss the ministers of his Government". At night Primo de Rivera drafted a manifesto "To the People and the Army" that was never made public and whose content was only known almost a hundred years later, in 2016. In the manifesto he asked that "the King cease to be King and with his family immediately leave the country" and "then it will be necessary to proclaim the republic and raise to his presidency a good, wise, equanimous and just man to whom we all Spaniards, even those with more monarchical feelings and stronger ties to the Royal Family, will loyally assist. The homeland is above all". "With this King neither could the former politicians, nor could the future ones, if I do not complete my work by clearing Spanish political life of this obstacle", was also stated in the manifesto.

=== Monday, January 27th ===
On January 27, Primo de Rivera received the ambiguous answers of the general captains which were due, according to Shlomo Ben-Ami, to his desire to distance the Army from the dictatorship, "a sinking ship" and to the fact that most of them were friends of the king or very loyal to him as sovereign. All of them reiterated their total obedience to the king and to the government that had his confidence. The most explicit in his reply was the captain general of Catalonia, General Emilio Barrera, a close collaborator and personal friend of Primo de Rivera, who openly criticized the consultation, considering that "it has the appearance of another coup d'état" (against the king), adding: "the consultation means weakness on the one hand and on the other, mixing the army in political matters, from which it should stay away. [...] Then [on September 13, 1923] the intervention of the army was logical; in today's case it already has the meaning of wanting to mix it in what is not its function...". The only ones who showed him unconditional support were General Sanjurjo, Director General of the Civil Guard, and the Captain General of the Balearic Islands, Enrique Marzo Balaguer.

=== Tuesday, January 28: Primo de Rivera resigns ===
According to Shlomo Ben-Ami, Primo de Rivera, despite the response he had received from his comrades-in-arms, was not willing to resign. The king commissioned the new Minister of Finance and man of his confidence, Francisco Moreno Zuleta, to persuade the dictator, but in the end it was the intervention of General Severiano Martínez Anido, his friend and Minister of the Interior, who convinced him not to try to resist. At half past ten in the morning Primo de Rivera, accompanied by Martínez Anido, went to the Palacio de Oriente and presented his resignation to the king. In that interview he suggested to Alfonso XIII that he should appoint generals Martínez Anido, Emilio Barrera or Dámaso Berenguer to succeed him as head of the Presidency of the Government. However, when Primo de Rivera left the Palace he did not declare to journalists that he had resigned and limited himself to saying that a council of ministers would be held in the afternoon. The resignation would not be formalized and would not be made public until 8:45 p.m. after a new visit to the Palace. At the exit, Primo de Rivera announced that he had resigned "for personal and health reasons" and that Alfonso XIII had entrusted the power "to form a Government to General Dámaso Berenguer, a discreet and reserved man in his judgments, of serene character and very well liked in the country."

According to Genoveva García Queipo de Llano and Javier Tusell, Primo de Rivera's resignation was due to "his poor health and [to] the desire he had to abandon the exercise of his responsibilities". This assessment is not shared by other historians such as Shlomo Ben-Ami or Alejandro Quiroga. The latter considers that the consultation with the captains general "was not a kind of intentional political "suicide", but rather a rather risky gamble to stay in office... Another thing is that Primo de Rivera miscalculated, as was the case."

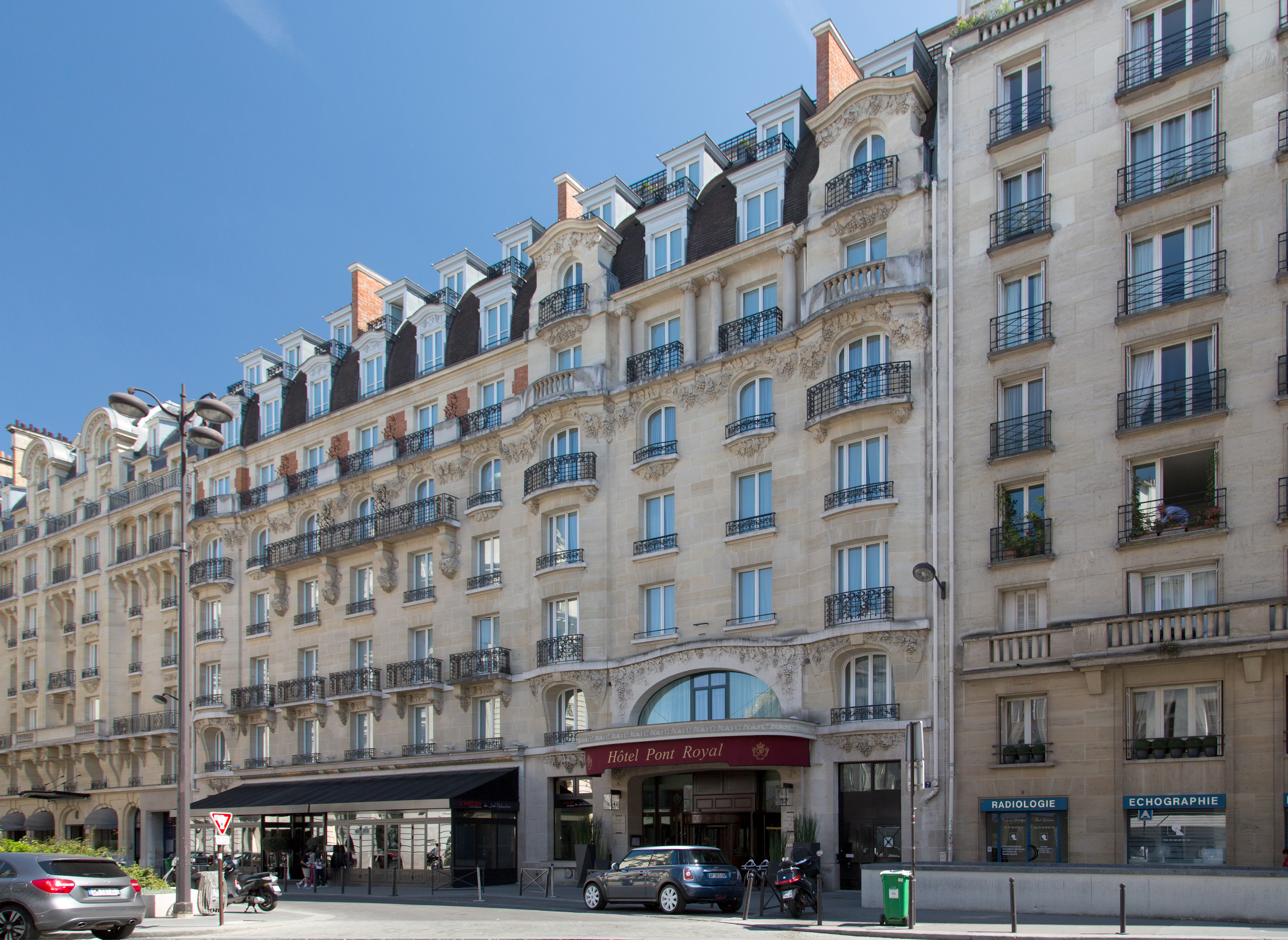
Main facade of the Hotel Pont Royal in Paris, located in the Saint Germain-des-Prés district. General Primo de Rivera died there on Sunday, March 16, 1930.

After his resignation, he left Spain. He passed through Barcelona, where he met with his friend Captain General Emilio Barrera. As Eduardo Aunós revealed fourteen years later, Primo de Rivera proposed that Barrera lead a coup d'état, but Barrera refused.

He died a few weeks later at the Pont Royal Hotel in Paris. According to Ángeles Barrio Alonso,

The feeling of frustration and abandonment that Primo de Rivera must have felt when, after his forced resignation in January 1930, he moved to Paris, probably accelerated his death, which took place two months later in complete solitude. Neither he nor his most direct collaborators —among whom, besides Calvo Sotelo or Aunós, we should mention his own son, José Antonio Primo de Rivera— could understand the little benevolence of the citizenship with what they considered a very positive balance of a regime, which would have freed Spain from separatism, trade unionism, deficit and war.

Alejandro Quiroga holds a similar view to that of Ángeles Barrio:

Primo left Spain hurt and sick... Primo felt that many social sectors did not recognize him for the, in his opinion, great work he had done for Spain, although he remained convinced until his last days that the Spanish people were with him. The injustices and betrayals he believed he had suffered made him a melancholy and somewhat resentful man.

Alfonso appointed General Dámaso Berenguer, head of the king's military household, as head of government, supposedly to restore constitutional government.

However, the constitutionalists were disappointed; they had expected José Sánchez Guerra to form a cabinet and hold elections for a Constituent Cortes. This had been rejected by Alfonso, who said "the first day of the Constituent Cortes would be the last of my reign".

== See also ==
- 1923 Spanish coup d'état
- Military directorate of Miguel Primo de Rivera
- Civil directorate of Miguel Primo de Rivera

== Bibliography ==
- Alía Miranda, Francisco (2023). La dictadura de Primo de Rivera (1923-1930). Paradojas y contradicciones del nuevo régimen (in Spanish). Madrid: Los Libros de la Catarata. ISBN 978-84-1352-702-4.
- Baras, Montserrat (1984). "La trajectòria d'Acció Catalana". L'Avenç (in Catalan) (72).
- Barrio Alonso, Ángeles (2004). La modernización de España (1917-1939). Política y sociedad (PDF) (in Spanish). Madrid: Síntesis. ISBN 84-9756-223-2.
- Ben-Ami, Shlomo (2012) [1983]. El cirujano de hierro. La dictadura de Primo de Rivera (1923-1930) [Fascism from above: Dictathorship of Primo de Rivera in Spain] (in Spanish). Barcelona: RBA. ISBN 978-84-9006-161-9.
- García Queipo de Llano, Genoveva (1997). El reinado de Alfonso XIII. La modernización fallida (in Spanish). Madrid: Historia 16. ISBN 84-7679-318-9.
- Gómez-Navarro, José Luis (2003). "El rey en la dictadura". Alfonso XIII. Un político en el trono (in Spanish) (Javier Moreno Luzón ed.). Madrid: Marcial Pons. pp. 337–372. ISBN 84-95379-59-7.
- González Calleja, Eduardo (2005). La España de Primo de Rivera. La modernización autoritaria 1923-1930 (in Spanish). Madrid: Alianza Editorial. ISBN 84-206-4724-1.
- Juliá, Santos (1999). Un siglo de España. Política y sociedad (in Spanish). Madrid: Marcial Pons. ISBN 84-9537903-1.
- Martorell Linares, Miguel (2003). "El rey en su desconcierto. Alfonso XIII, los viejos políticos y el ocaso de la monarquía". Alfonso XIII. Un político en el trono (in Spanish) (Javier Moreno Luzón ed.). Madrid: Marcial Pons. pp. 373–402. ISBN 84-95379-59-7.
- Moreno Luzón, Javier (2023). El rey patriota. Alfonso XIII y la nación (in Spanish). Barcelona: Galaxia Gutenberg. ISBN 978-84-19392-11-4.
- Quiroga Fernández de Soto, Alejandro (2022). Miguel Primo de Rivera. Dicatdura, populismo y nación (in Spanish). Barcelona: Crítica. ISBN 978-84-9199-461-9.
- Tusell, Javier; García Queipo de Llano, Genoveva (2002) [2001]. Alfonso XIII. El rey polémico (in Spanish) (2nd ed.). Madrid: Taurus. ISBN 84-306-0449-9.
