= National Assembly (Spain) =

Assembly during the dictatorship of Primo de Rivera in Spain (1927–1930)

National Assembly Asamblea Nacional

Type
- Type: consultative body

History
- Established: 1927
- Disbanded: 1929

Leadership
- President: José Yanguas Messía

Meeting place
- Palacio de las Cortes, Madrid

The National Assembly (Spanish: Asamblea Nacional) sometimes also referred to in Spanish as Asamblea Nacional Consultiva ("National Consultative Assembly") was a corporative chamber in Spain created by the dictatorship of Primo de Rivera, charged with the task of drafting a new constitution. It was active from 1927 to 1929.

== History and features ==
Described as the first corporative chamber created in Europe during the interwar period, in the view of Boris Mirkine-Guetzévitch the corporative nature had been chosen in order "to subject Spain to that discipline that will free her from the democratic virus".

It was created via Royal Decree from 12 September 1927 published in the Gaceta de Madrid on 14 September. Lacking in legislative power, the body only had a "consultative" nature. Initially set to have a minimum of 325 and a maximum of 375 members (known as asambleístas), its size was later increased up to 400 members, requiring members to have the Spanish citizenship, to be over 25 years old, and to be free from incriminatory sentences. It allowed women to be members, although only after being given permission from their husbands. The first session took place on 10 October 1927 and the last on 6 July 1929.

The direct or indirect appointment by the government of the members of the National Assembly came to replace people's election. Appointed by the regime, José Yanguas Messía became the president of the National Assembly.

The unimplemented Constitutional draft elaborated by the National Assembly had an anti-liberal and authoritarian character. Made public in July 1929, it met the outright rejection from the Liberal, Monarchist and Republican forces in the opposition. It even got to the point of raising criticism from within the National Assembly, and not even the dictator found satisfactory several features and details of the draft.
