= José de Yanguas, 11th Viscount of Santa Clara de Avedillo =

Spanish noble, politician and diplomat

The Most Excellent José de Yanguas Viscount of Santa Clara de Avedillo
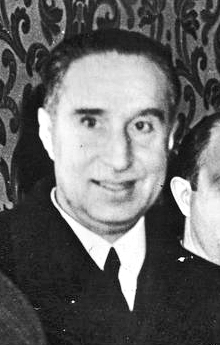

Appointee to the National Council
- In office March 16, 1943 – October 2, 1943

Ambassador of Spain to the Holy See
- In office May 17, 1938 – 1942
- Leader: Francisco Franco
- Preceded by: Luis de Zulueta
- Succeeded by: Domingo de las Bárcenas y Lopez-Mollinedo Mercado

President of the National Assembly
- In office October 10, 1927 – July 6, 1929
- Preceded by: position established
- Succeeded by: position abolished

Minister of State
- In office December 3, 1925 – February 20, 1927
- Preceded by: Santiago Alba y Bonifaz
- Succeeded by: Miguel Primo de Rivera

Deputy of the Cortes Generales for Baeza
- In office December 30, 1920 – September 15, 1923

Personal details
- Born: José María Yanguas y Messía; February 25, 1890 Linares, Spain
- Died: June 30, 1974 (aged 84) Madrid, Spanish State
- Party: Conservative (1923-1931)
- Occupation: Diplomat, politician, jurist & professor

José de Yanguas y Messía, 11th Viscount of Santa Clara de Avedillo (25 February 1890, in Linares, Jaén, Spain – 30 June 1974, in Madrid, Spain) was a Spanish noble, politician and diplomat who served as Minister of State and president of the National Assembly during the dictatorship of Primo de Rivera and Ambassador to the Holy See during that of General Francisco Franco. A fervent monarchist, he conspired against the Spanish Second Republic, and worked with Accion Espanola, a group and magazine which endeavoured to lay ideological foundations for a rebellion. He joined the Uprising of 1936 as soon as it began and drew up the Junta's decree of 29 September 1936 that proclaimed Franco Chief of the government of the Spanish State.

He was son of Don José de Yanguas y Ximénez and of Doña Mª de la Blanca Messía y Almansa, of the IX marquises of Busianos. He married in Madrid, the 6 May 1928, Doña Rosario Pérez de Herrasti y Orellana, daughter of Don Antonio Pérez de Herrasti y Pérez de Herrasti, IV Count of Antillón, and Doña Mª de la Concepción Orellana, XIII Marchioness of Albayda, Grandee of Spain. They had a single son, José de Yanguas y Pérez de Herrasti.
