= Autonomous Region of Catalonia (1931–1939) =

Autonomous polity in Spain

Catalonia Catalunya (Catalan) Cataluña (Spanish)
- 1931–1939
- Flag Seal
- Anthem: Els Segadors (Catalan) "The Reapers"
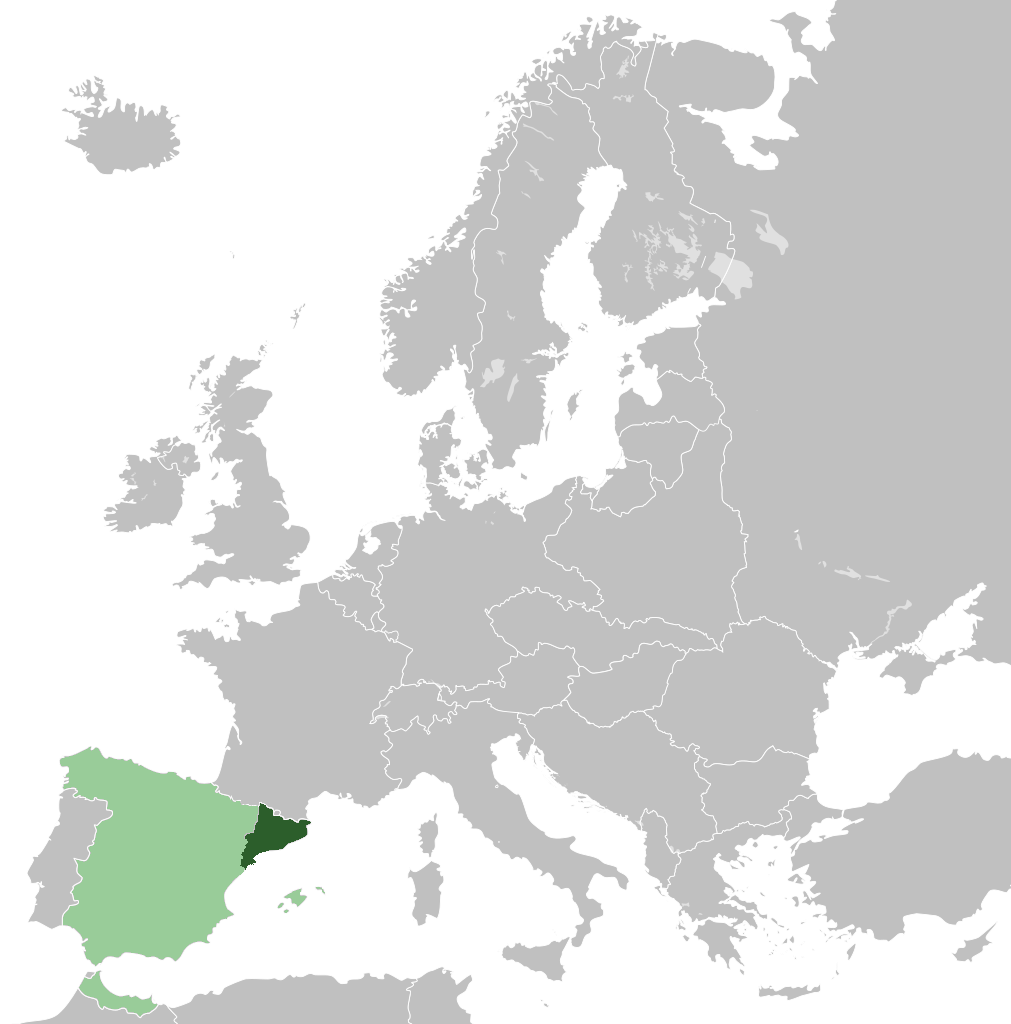
- Location of Catalonia (dark green) within the Spanish Republic (light green) and Europe
- Status: Autonomous region within the Second Spanish Republic
- Capital: Barcelona
- Common languages: Catalan, Spanish
- Demonym: Catalan or Catalonian
- Government: Generalitat of Catalonia
- President
  - 1931–1933: Francesc Macià (first)
  - 1933–1939: Lluís Companys (last)
- Legislature: Parliament of Catalonia (1932–1939)
- Historical era: Interwar period / Spanish Civil War
  - Established: 17 April 1931
  - Statute of Autonomy: 9 September 1932
  - Events of 6 October: 6 October 1934
  - Military uprising: 19 July 1936
  - Francoist occupation of Barcelona: 26 January 1939
Preceded by
Catalan Republic
Succeeded by
Revolutionary Catalonia (1936–1937)
Francoist Spain
Generalitat de Catalunya in exile
- Today part of: Spain ∟Catalonia

The Autonomous Region of Catalonia (Catalan: Regió autònoma de Catalunya, Spanish: Región autónoma de Cataluña) was established after the grant of self-government to Catalonia during the Second Spanish Republic (1931–1939), becoming an autonomous region within the Spanish Republic. The Generalitat of Catalonia (Catalan: Generalitat de Catalunya) was the institution in which the autonomous government of Catalonia was organized, it was established in order to replace the Catalan Republic proclaimed during the events of the proclamation of the Spanish Republic.

Historians often uses the term "Republican Generalitat" (Catalan: Generalitat Republicana) to refer to this period of the history of Catalonia, in order to distinguish it from the second and current stage of Catalan self-government.

== Background ==
In 1914, the Commonwealth of Catalonia was established, under the presidency of Enric Prat de la Riba (1914–1917) and Josep Puig i Cadafalch (1917–1923), both members of the conservative Regionalist League, then the leading force of Catalan nationalism. It was an administrative institution composed of the provincial councils of Barcelona, Girona, Lleida and Tarragona, but lacked any political or legislative powers.

The Commonwealth was abolished on 20 March 1925 by decision of the Dictatorship of Miguel Primo de Rivera (1923–1930). After the failed pro-autonomy campaign of 1919, Catalan nationalism became radicalized and adopted more left-wing positions, establishing or reinforcing political parties such as Francesc Macià's pro-independence Estat Català, the Catalan Republican Party, Catalan Action or the Socialist Union of Catalonia, as well as trade unions such as the CADCI or the Unió de Rabassaires. These factors and the shared repression carried out by the Dictatorship facilitated a rapprochement between Catalan nationalism and Spanish Republican forces.

In 1926, Estat Català attempted to liberate Catalonia from the Dictatorship with a volunteer militia and establish an independent Catalan Republic, but the plot was discovered by French police and aborted. Francesc Macià was arrested and judged in France, however, gaining popularity. By the Pact of San Sebastián of 17 August 1930, Republican and Catalan political parties agreed on a global design for the imminent change of regime that included the political autonomy of Catalonia within the projected Republic.

== Proclamation of the Republic and the Provisional Generalitat ==
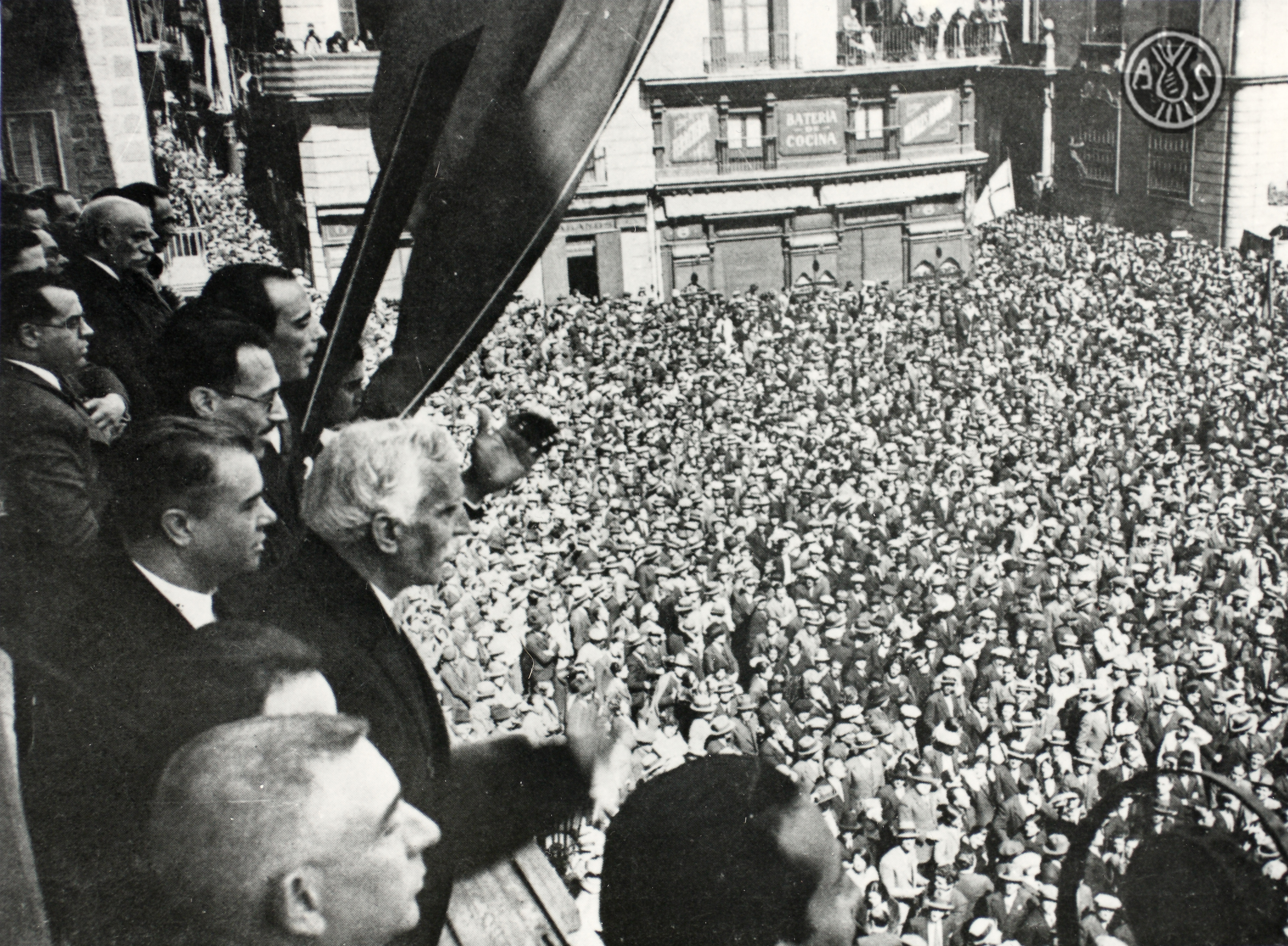
Proclamation of the Catalan Republic in Plaça de Sant Jaume by Francesc Macià, Barcelona, 14 April 1931

On 12 April 1931, local elections gave a large and unexpected majority in Catalonia (including Barcelona) to the Republican Left of Catalonia (Catalan: Esquerra Republicana de Catalunya, ERC), a party that had been founded three weeks earlier by the union of Macià's pro-independence Estat Català, the Catalan Republican Party, led by Lluís Companys, and L'Opinió group. Francesc Macià proclaimed in Barcelona "the Catalan Republic as a State of the Iberian Federation" on 14 April, few hours before the Second Spanish Republic was proclaimed in Madrid. This proclamation and the duality of powers it entailed worried the new Spanish Republic provisional government and, on the 17th, Macià reached an agreement with Spanish ministers Fernando de los Ríos, Marcel·lí Domingo, and Lluís Nicolau d'Olwer, under which the Catalan Republic was renamed with the more ambiguous name of Generalitat de Catalunya, thus recovering the name of one of the most relevant government institutions of the ancient Principality of Catalonia, abolished in 1714.

On 28 April 1931, through a decree of the Spanish Council of Ministers, the Provisional government of the Generalitat was set up, presided by Macià himself and composed by a council or government, an assembly of representatives of the municipalities (the Provisional Deputation of the Generalitat) and the commissioners who, as delegates, were in charge of the services belonging to the suppressed provincial councils of Girona, Tarragona and Lleida. The seat of the Generalitat was established in the Palace of the Plaça de Sant Jaume, Barcelona (which, in turn, was the seat of the original Generalitat). Despite the lack of formal autonomy in this period, the Generalitat showed deployment efforts such as the establishment of the Council of Culture, on 9 June 1931.

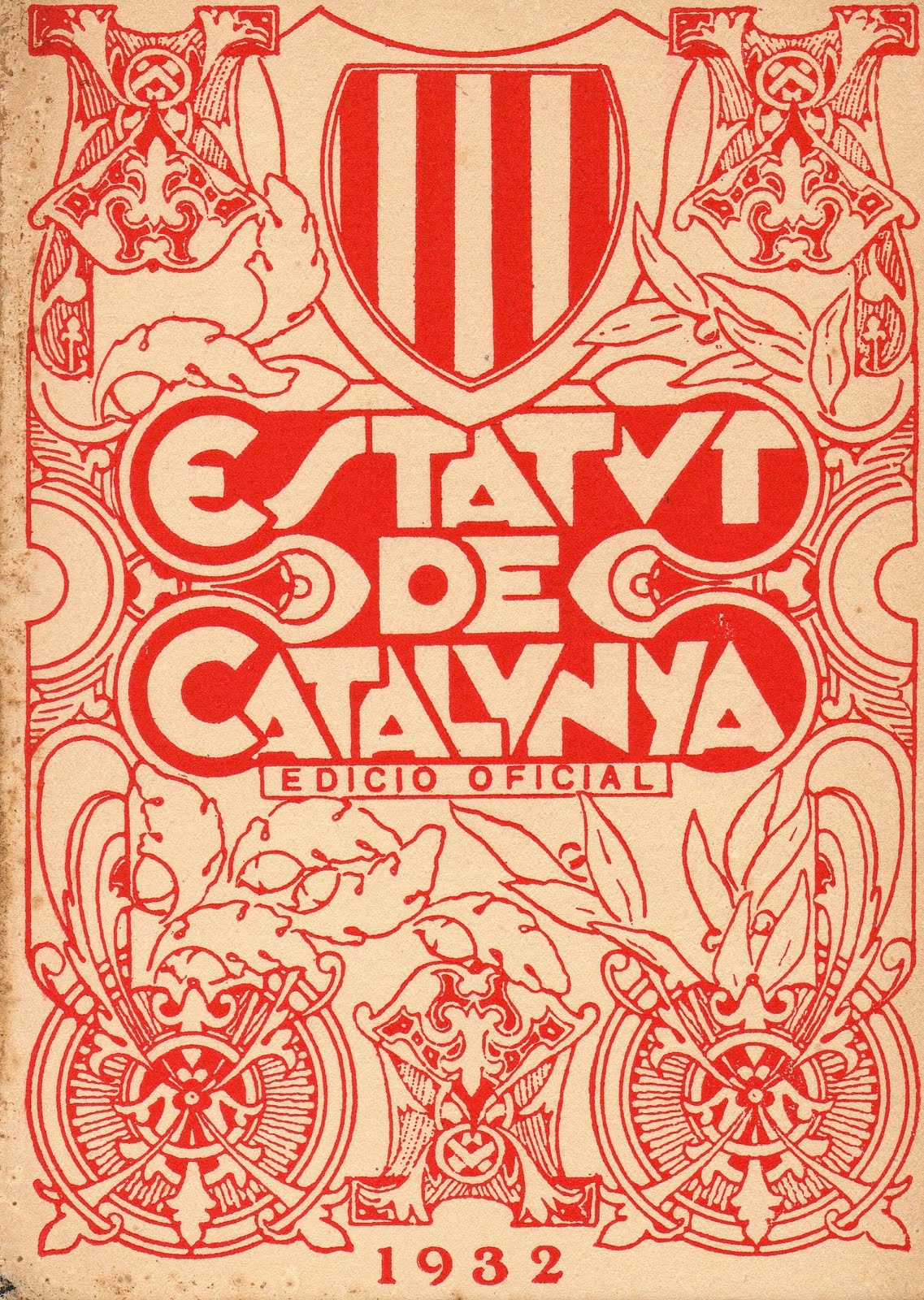
Portrait of the Statute of Autonomy of 1932

Catalan representatives of the Provisional Deputation prepared a draft bill of the statute of autonomy of Catalonia in Núria (Ripollès, province of Girona) with strong federal features and an extensive list of competences, which was approved in a referendum by the Catalan people on 2 August 1931. The Constitution of the Spanish Republic approved on 9 December 1931 established a unitary state with the possibility of creating autonomous regions, thus differing from the federal Catalan statute proposal. After prolonged and harsh parliamentary debates, it was substantially modified and finally passed by the Spanish Cortes on 9 September 1932.

With the Statute approved, on 20 November 1932, the first and sole elections to the Parliament of Catalonia of the Republican era were called. The Republican Left of Catalonia, in coalition with the Socialist Union of Catalonia and other minor Republican parties, won a large majority of seats (67 of 85), while the previously hegemonic Regionalist League came in second place but far behind ERC (17 from 85). which allowed the beginning of construction of the institutions and move from a provisional government to a statutory government with Francesc Macià ratified as President of the Generalitat and Lluís Companys as speaker of Parliament.

== Macià government ==
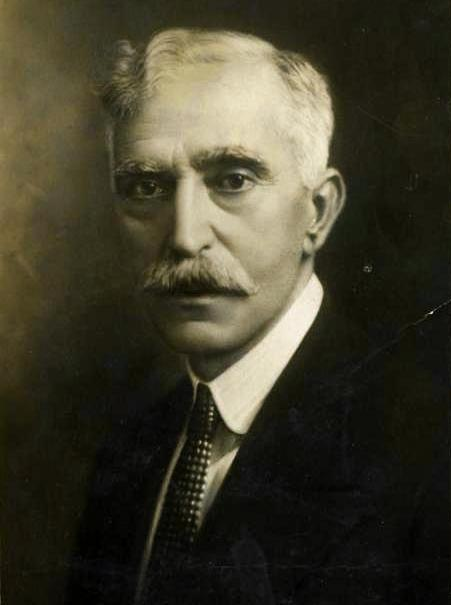
Francesc Macià

Once Francesc Macià was officially appointed, he formed an Executive Council made up exclusively by members of ERC. The most urgent task pending at legislative level was the exhaustive organization of the new institutions. To fulfill that purpose, the Parliament of Catalonia passed its first law, the Statute of Internal Regime of Catalonia (Catalan: Estatut de Règim Interior de Catalunya). The Interior Statute was seen as the equivalent to the Catalan Constitution, and its structure was similar to that of a constitutional text.

While Macià's government sought to implement a progressive agenda to improve the living conditions of the popular classes and the petite bourgeoisie, as well to normalize Catalan language at institutional level, the government faced various limitations on their power due to the low fiscal autonomy granted by the Statute, the slow transfer of competencies from the Spanish government, the economic crisis, the working class struggles and the internal disputes between ERC factions.

== Companys government ==
On 25 December 1933, Macià died and the Parliament appointed Lluís Companys as his successor, who held the position until the end of the civil war, except for the suspension of the Statute (Black biennium) that dates from October 1934 to February 1936, caused by the Events of 6 October.

Despite the victory of the right in the 1933 Spanish general election, the effort of institutional deployment by the Generalitat continued. The transfer of public order services made it possible to eliminate civilian governors (11 January 1934), giving rise to the Catalan Security Council, which coordinated regional and state actions in this area. By the law of the Parliament of 2 March, the Court of Cassation of Catalonia was founded, with jurisdiction over civil and administrative matters belonging to the Generalitat.

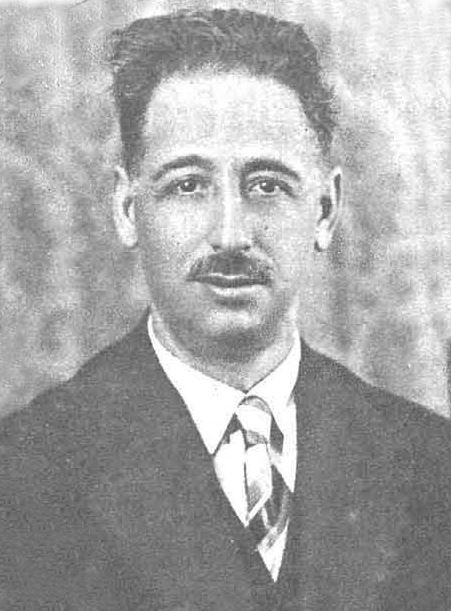
Lluís Companys

The Parliament of Catalonia continued its legislative work by approving several progressive laws that sought to modernize the country and improve the living conditions of Catalan population. Along these lines, the controversial Crop Contracts Law was approved on 11 April 1934, which sought to solve the issue of the Dead Cultivator and to facilitate the cultivators' access to the land they were working on. From its inception, the law encountered fierce opposition from the Catalan League (the refoundation of the Regionalist League) and the Catalan Agricultural Institute of Sant Isidre, representative of agricultural owners and close to the League. The Law was taken to the Court of Constitutional Guarantees of the Republic, which annulled it. The response of the Generalitat was the approval of an identical law in the Parliament, leading to the beginning of a negotiation with the government of the Republic headed by the Republican radical Ricardo Samper, in order to adapt the text to the general legislation and thus derailing the conflict.

=== Events of 6 October and the Popular Front ===
On 6 October, in response to the accession of the right-wing CEDA into the Spanish government, President Companys unilaterally proclaimed a "Catalan State of the Spanish Federal Republic" but the insurrection was defeated the same day by the Captain General of Catalonia, Domènec Batet i Mestres, and Companys and his ministers were dismissed and imprisoned.

Between October 1934 and February 1936, the Statute and the Parliament were suspended by the Spanish government and the Presidency of the Generalitat was occupied by officers appointed by the Spanish government with the title of governor-general of Catalonia: Manuel Portela Valladares (10/1-23/4/1935), the Republican radical Joan Pich i Pon (23/4-28/10/1935), Eduardo Alonso Alonso (28.10.1935-27.11.1935), the Valencian CEDA member Ignasi Villalonga (27/11-16/12/1935) and the Catalan League member Fèlix Escalas (18/12/1935-17/2/1936).

After the victory of the Popular Front in the 1936 Spanish general election, the suspension of the Statute was lifted and Companys and the Catalan ministers were pardoned and reinstated in their positions. The also suspended Parliament resumed the legislative activity in a considerably less belligerent atmosphere between the Republican Left and the Catalan League. The Catalan government began preparations to host in Barcelona the People's Olympiad, as an anti-fascist response to the 1936 Summer Olympics held in Berlin, which was then under control of Nazi Germany, but the same day of its planned inauguration (19 July), the Spanish Army carried out a partially failed coup d'état which led to the Spanish Civil War.

== The Generalitat during the Civil War ==
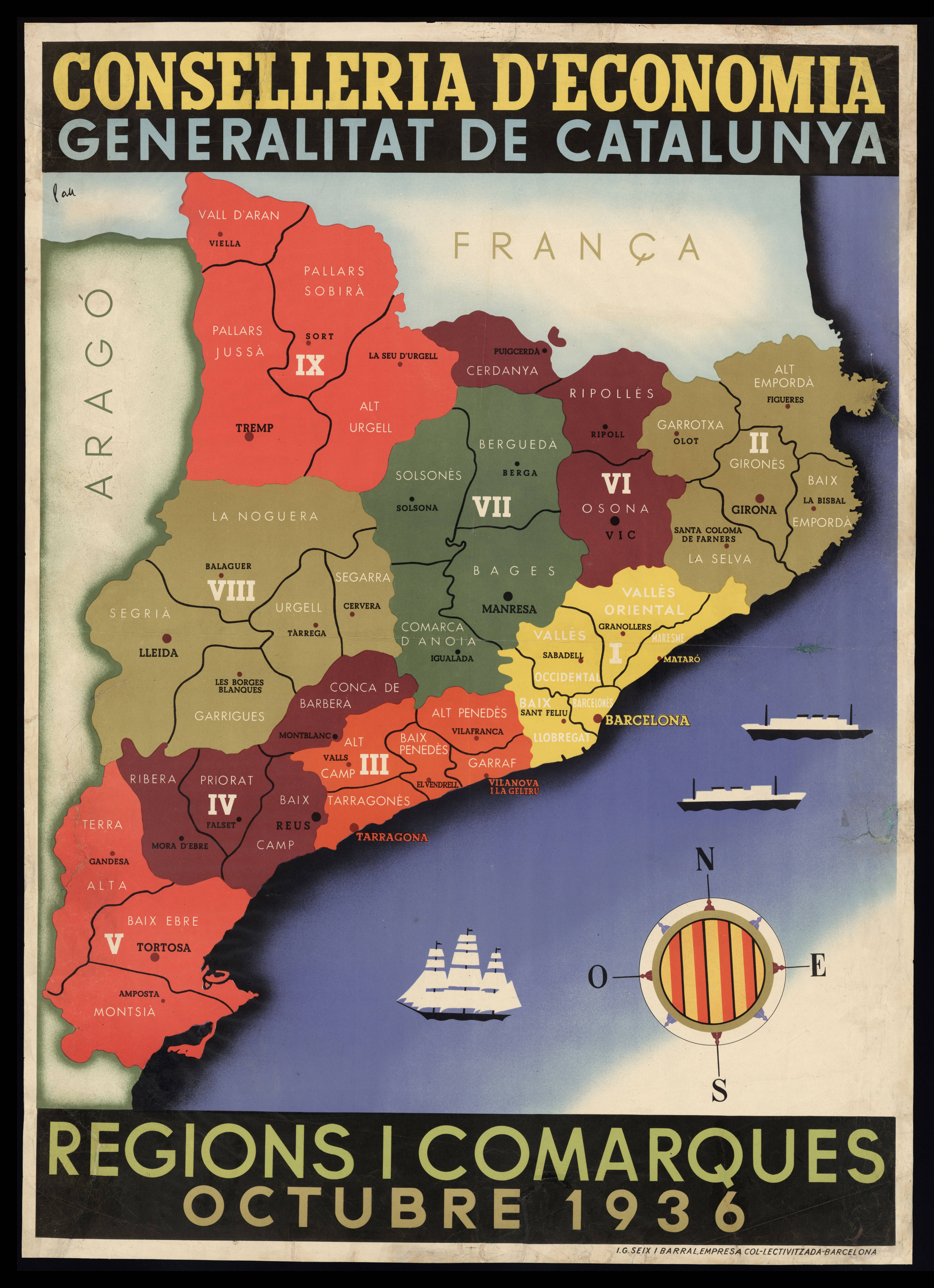
Territorial division of Catalonia in comarques and regions (thus replacing the four Spanish provinces), passed by decree of the Government of Catalonia in October 1936

The coup and the military uprising of 18 July failed in Catalonia thanks mainly to the action of the popular militias. The forces of the CNT imposed a Central Committee of Antifascist Militias of Catalonia that acted de facto as the government body over the following months. In September 1936, Josep Tarradellas as first minister formed a unity government with left-wing parties and unions and approved the Collectivization Decree of 24 October.

The events of May 1937 (conflict between anarchists and communist factions) stopped the revolution, and the republican forces concentrated their activity on the war. At the end of 1937 the Spanish Republican government moved to Barcelona, which caused many disputes between the two governments.

Although General Francisco Franco formally abolished the Generalitat when his forces entered Catalonia through Lleida in April 1938, the Republican Generalitat continued to act in the unoccupied territory until the fall of Barcelona to the Nationalist army troops on 26 January 1939.

== See also ==
- Revolutionary Catalonia

== Sources and bibliography ==
- Sobrequés i Callicó, Jaume. Catalunya i la Segona República. Edicions d'Ara (Barcelona, 1983) ISBN 84-248-0793-6
- Roglan, Joaquim (2006). 14 d'abril: la Catalunya republicana (1931–1939). Cossetània Edicions. ISBN 8497912039.
- De la Granja, José Luis; Beramendi, Justo; Anguera, Pere (2001). La España de los nacionalismos y las autonomías. Madrid: Síntesis.
- Abello Güell, Teresa (2007). El debat estatutari del 1932 (PDF). Barcelona: Parlament de Catalunya. ISBN 9788439375876.
- Fontana, Josep (2014). La formació d'una identitat. Una història de Catalunya. Ed. Eumo. ISBN 9788497665261.
