= 1934 Catalan local elections =

- 14 January 1934

1,029 municipal councils
- Registered: 1,666,000
- Turnout: 996,000 (59.8%)
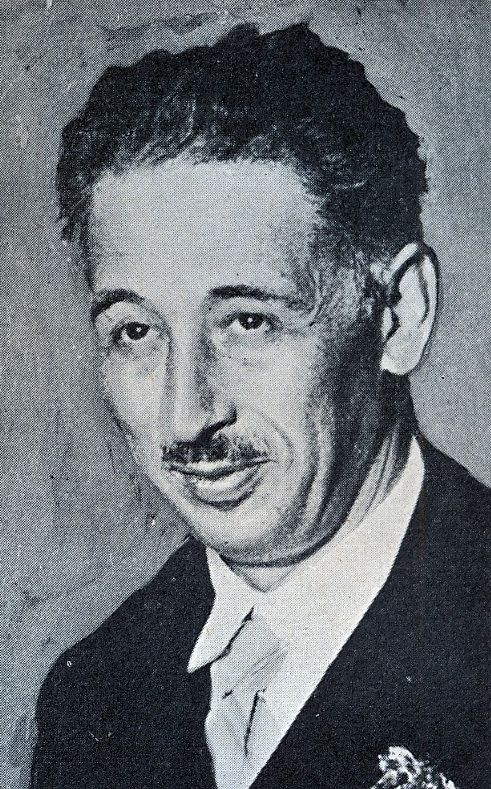

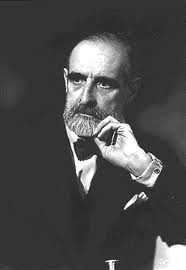
	Majority party	Minority party
Leader	Lluís Companys	Francesc Cambó
Party	ERC	Catalan League
Popular vote	520,000	412,000
Percentage	52.4	41.4
- Judicial district capitals results map for municipal elections

The 1934 Catalan local elections were held on 14 January to elect the municipal councils in all the 1,029 municipalities of Catalonia. These elections were only held in Catalonia, as the 1932 Statute of Autonomy devolved the competences on local elections to the Generalitat de Catalunya. These were the first and only election to be organised by the Catalan Government, since this administration was suppressed by the Dictatorship of Francisco Franco in 1939, after winning the Spanish Civil War. The following free local elections were not held until 1979, during the transition to democracy.

== Electoral system ==
The electoral system was determined by the Municipal Law, which was approved by the Parliament of Catalonia in August 1933. The elections were scheduled to be held in November 1933, but they were delayed to January in order not to interfere with the 1933 general election. The municipal council seats of all the 1,029 municipalities of Catalonia were up for election. The population-seat relationship on each municipality was to be established on the following scale:

Population	Seats
<500	5
501–1,000	6
1,001–1,500	7
1,501–2,000	8
2,001–2,500	9
2,501–3,000	10
3,001–5,000	12
5,001–10,000	16
10,001–20,000	18
>20,000	24
Barcelona	40

All the councillors were elected in single multi-member districts, consisting of the municipality's territory, using closed lists. The allocation of seats depended on the population:

- In municipalities under 10,000 inhabitants: the winning list obtained two-thirds to four-fifths of the seats in the council, the second party obtained the remaining seats.
- In municipalities over 10,000 inhabitants: the winning list obtained 65% of the seats in the council, the second party obtained the 65% of the remaining seats, the third party obtained the 65% of the remaining seats and so on. If at the end there were still unfilled seats, these would be won by the last party having received a seat.

The mayors were elected on the first plenary session by the councillors. Candidates obtaining an absolute majority on a first or second round were elected. If none of the candidates had achieved an absolute majority, a third round would have been held, where the candidate with plurality would be elected.

== Results ==
=== Overall ===
← Summary of 14 January 1934 local election results →
Parties and coalitions	Votes	%
Left-wing coalitions	311,000	31.2
Republican Left of Catalonia (ERC)	182,000	18.3
Other left-wing lists	29,000	2.9
Republican left	520,000	52.4
Catalan League (LC)	244,000	24.5
Right-wing coalitions	147,000	14.8
Other right-wing lists	21,000	2.1
Right-wing parties	412,000	41.4
Radical Republican Party (PRR)	31,000	3.1
Workers and Peasants' Bloc (BOC)	11,000	1.1
Catalan Republican Action (ACR)	10,000	1.0
Other	9,000	0.9
Blank votes	1,000	0.1
Total	996,000	100.0
Votes cast / turnout	996,000	59.8
Abstentions	670,000	40.2
Registered voters	1,666,000	

Turnout was 59.8%, lower than the 1931 elections, but similar to the 1933 general election. The highest abstention rates were found in towns across the Pyrenees. The left-wing parties got a majority of votes, specially in Penedès and in the metropolitan area of Barcelona. The right-wing parties made their best results in Solsonès, Segarra and Alt Urgell, and they won in cities like Girona, Vic, Olot or El Vendrell.

=== Juditial district capitals ===
Leading list in the juditial district capitals

Vote share

In the following table, background-coloured rows indicate the winning list in a municipality.

Municipality	BOC	ERC	Left coal.	Other left	ACR	PRR	LC	Right coal.	Other right
Arenys de Mar		12.0			8.0	27.0	53.0		
Badalona	3.1		52.6					44.3	
Balaguer	10.7	45.6					43.8		
Barcelona	1.1		50.3	0.2		6.5	41.3		0.6
Berga			52.8					47.2	
Cervera		40.6					59.4		
El Vendrell	30.5		30.6					38.9	
Falset			33.4					66.6	
Figueres	1.7	60.1		1.8		8.5	27.5		
Gandesa		46.2					53.8		
Girona	2.0	44.6			4.5	2.0		45.1	1.8
Granollers		24.3			35.4	26.3	14.0		
Igualada			51.6			2.8		45.6	
La Bisbal d'Empordà		54.6						45.4	
La Seu d'Urgell		42.7						57.3	
Les Borges Blanques	6.7	58.3						35.0	
L'Hospitalet de Llobregat	0.6		50.3	9.7		5.3	34.1		
Lleida	5.1		55.0					39.9	
Manresa	0.3		53.5					46.1	
Mataró			53.3					46.7	
Montblanc			58.0				42.0		
Olot			41.5		16.3			42.2	
Puigcerdà			46.3					53.7	
Reus	1.6		43.7		32.0		22.7		
Sabadell			55.4	0.7		3.9	37.0		
Sant Feliu de Llobregat		53.1		3.2	19.5			24.2	
Santa Coloma de Farners		46.1		8.1			45.8		
Solsona		25.4						74.6	
Sort		49.1						50.9	
Tarragona			53.3	7.2				36.4	
Terrassa	2.3		52.5					45.2	3.0
Tortosa			59.9					40.1	
Tremp		51.4						48.6	
Valls			52.3					47.7	
Vic	1.1		33.3		7.1	1.1		57.4	
Vielha			?					?	
Vilafranca del Penedès			51.2					48.8	
Vilanova i la Geltrú	4.5		63.4				32.1		

Elected councillors by political party

In the following table, background-coloured rows indicate the ruling parties in a municipality.

Municipality	Total	BOC	PSOE	USC	ERC	Other left	ACR	PRDF	PRR	LC	CT	Other right
Arenys de Mar	16								5	11		
Badalona	24			3	10	2	1		2	4	2	
Balaguer	16				11					5		
Barcelona	40			3	17	2	4		4	10		
Berga	16				9	2				5		
Cervera	12				4					8		
El Vendrell	12				2	2						8
Falset	10					3						7
Figueres	18				12							6
Gandesa	12				4					8		
Girona	24				6	1				10	6	1
Granollers	18				2		12		4			
Igualada	18				10		2			6		
La Bisbal d'Empordà	12				8							4
La Seu d'Urgell	12				4							8
Les Borges Blanques	12				8							4
L'Hospitalet de Llobregat	24				13	2		1		8		
Lleida	24		1		12	2	1		2	3		3
Manresa	24			2	10		2	2	2	4	2	
Mataró	24		1	4	9	2			1	6	1	
Montblanc	12	4			4					4		
Olot	18	1			3		2			9		3
Puigcerdà	10		3							2		5
Reus	24		6	3	7		6			2		
Sabadell	24			1	5			10		8		
Sant Feliu de Llobregat	16				11					2	2	1
Santa Coloma de Farners	12				8					4		
Solsona	12				4							8
Sort	6				2							4
Tarragona	24		4		4		4	4	1	1		6
Terrassa	24				12	2		2	1	3	1	3
Tortosa	24		2		1	12	1			3	5	
Tremp	10				7							3
Valls	18	1		3	7	1				3	2	1
Vic	18	1		1	4					8	4	
Vielha	6				2							4
Vilafranca del Penedès	16				6		1	4	2	1		2
Vilanova i la Geltrú	18			2	6	4				6		

== See also ==
- 1934 Barcelona City Council election
- Events of 6 October
