= Catalonia and World War II =

When, in 1939, World War II erupted in Europe, Catalonia was part of Spain led by the caudillo Francisco Franco, who declared Spain neutral in the conflict. The country was devastated by the recently finished Spanish Civil War, which resulted in the defeat of the Second Spanish Republic and the creation of the Spanish State, and Catalonia, who was an autonomous region under the Republican government (1931-1939) lost the whole of its self-government when the Nationalist army occupied the area.

However, despite the fact that Spain was officially neutral in World War II, the conflict affected Catalan territory and Catalans who lived outside, as well its institutions in exile, in different degrees.

== Prelude ==
The industrialized land of Catalonia in Spain became autonomous shortly after the proclamation of Second Spanish Republic (14 April 1931). It established its own government, the Generalitat de Catalunya, and received and Statute of Autonomy in 1932. The Parliament and Government of Catalonia were dominated by the Republican Left of Catalonia (ERC) after its first election in November 1932. Under the presidency of Francesc Macià (1931-1933) and his successor Lluís Companys (1933-1940), both members of ERC, the Generalitat tried to implement an advanced social program, despite the internal difficulties. This period was marked by political unrest, the effects of the economic crisis and its social repercussions.

As for the workers' movement, the anarchist trade union CNT (the greatest in Catalonia at the time) had been active throughout the period, realizing demonstrations, general strikes and some proclamations of the libertarian communism, while the marxist parties were progressively unified with the formation of the Workers' Party of Marxist Unification (Spanish: Partido Obrero de Unificación Marxista, POUM) in September 1935 and the pro-soviet Unified Socialist Party of Catalonia (Catalan: Partit Socialista Unificat de Catalunya, PSUC) in July 1936.

The defeat of the military rebellion against the Republican government in Barcelona placed Catalonia firmly in the Republican side of the Spanish Civil War. During the war, there were two rival powers in Catalonia: the de jure power of the Generalitat and the de facto power of the armed popular militias. Violent confrontations between the workers' parties (CNT-FAI and POUM against the PSUC) culminated in the defeat of the first ones in 1937. The situation resolved itself progressively in favor of the Generalitat, but at the same time the Generalitat was partially losing its autonomous power within Republican Spain. In 1938 Nationalist troops broke the Republican territory in two, isolating Catalonia from the rest of the Republic. The defeat of the Republican army in the Battle of the Ebro led in 1938 and 1939 to the final defeat of the Catalonian Republican forces in the Catalonia Offensive, who abolished the Catalan autonomy and brought it into Spain proper.

== Exile ==
After the fall of Barcelona, on 26 January 1939, Catalan and Spanish Republican governments marched to the north and, shortly after the fall of Girona, they crossed the French border; the President of Catalonia, Lluís Companys made it on 5 February, alongside thousands of refugees who tried to escape from Nationalist advance. The Generalitat de Catalunya began the exile with many troubles, among them, the lack of economic resources and the disputes between sectors of Catalan nationalism. The Republican Left of Catalonia, the most relevant political party during the Republican era, lost many of its militants during the war and the Francoist repression, and its institutional structure almost disappeared.

Due to this problems, Companys, established in Paris, was unable to constitute a Catalan government in exile. Also the Parliament couldn't meet, as a result, the presidency was the only effective representation of the Generalitat, so Companys decided create the National Council of Catalonia. It had to be a national representative body in exile, formed by five five cultural personalities, under the presidency of Pompeu Fabra.

== Axis presence in Catalonia ==
Before the War of Spain, Catalonia attracted some interest of Italy and the Third Reich. After the establishment of Catalan self-government in 1931, the Italian consulate in Barcelona increased its activities in order to explore the possibility to create a fascist movement in Catalonia from Catalan nationalism, as the Fascist Italy saw the Spanish Republic a rival for its hegemony around the Mediterranean. However, the approach to Catalan nationalism was unsuccessful, while the Italian government showed more interest in to the Falange and the conspirational elements of the Spanish Army. The Italian bombers helped to the Nationalist faction in the Civil War bombing Barcelona and other Catalan places.

Barcelona was the residence of a relevant German colony during the 1930s.

During his visit in Spain, SS leader Heinrich Himmler visited Barcelona and the Monastery of Montserrat between 23 and 24 October 1940. It was received by General Orgaz (chief of the Spanish Army in Catalonia) and the other authorities of the city.

== Catalan participation in Allied side ==
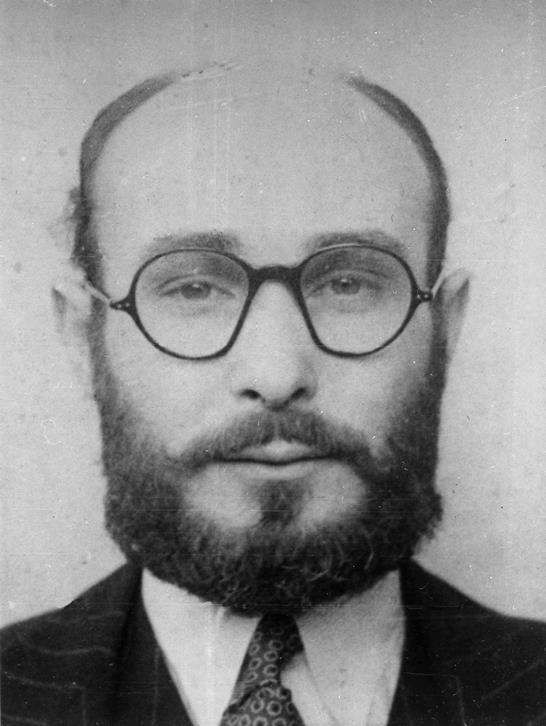
Joan Pujol, "Garbo"

Doctor Josep Trueta, exiled in the United Kingdom, helped to organize medical emergency services. He denounced the situation of Catalonia in Francoist Spain, and wrote The Spirit of Catalonia, a book explaining Catalan history to English-speaking society.

Catalans were also found in the Eastern Front fighting in the Soviet side. The militant of the PSUC Sebastià Piera fought in Moscow, Leningrad, Stalingrad and the Caucasus, and performed commando actions behind the German lines.

In 1944, Catalan double agent Joan Pujol Garcia (codename "Garbo" by the British) had a key role in the success of Operation Fortitude, the deception operation intended to mislead the Germans about the timing and location of the invasion of Normandy in 1944. The false information Pujol supplied to the Germans helped persuade them that the main attack would be in the Pas de Calais, so that they kept large forces there before the invasion. He was condecorated by Britain and Germany, as the Germans never realised they had been fooled, becoming the only known person to receive decorations from both sides during World War II.

=== Catalans in the French Resistance ===
- Mució Miquel (1902-1945);
- Conrad Miret i Musté (1906-1942);
- Josep Miret i Musté (1907-1944);
- Anna Maria Martínez Sagi (1907-2000);
- Teresa Carbó i Comas (1908-2010);
- Manuel Bergès i Arderiu (1910-1942);
- Neus Català (1915-2019);
- Adela Carreras Taurà (1916-1999);
- Sara Berenguer (1919-2010);
- Pepita Carnicer (1920-2011);
- Conchita Grangé-Ramos (1925-2019)

== Attempts of liberation ==
In 1944, while the liberation of France from German occupation was a fact, the Communist Party of Spain promoted the Operación Reconquista, consisting on the invasion of the Aran Valley, in northwestern Catalonia, as the first step of defeating the Spanish State. The Maquis took control of several villages of the valley until 27 October 1944 but were forced to retreat back into France after Franco sent reinforcements to defend Vielha, the Aranese capital.

== See also ==
- History of Catalonia
- Spain during World War II

== Bibliography and further reading ==
- Vilanova, Francesc; Capdevila, Mireia (2017) Nazis a Barcelona. L'esplendor feixista de postguerra (1939-1945). L'Avenç. ISBN 978-84-16853-05-2
