= 1932 Catalan regional election =

Election in the Spanish region of Catalonia

- 20 November 1932

All 85 seats in the Parliament of Catalonia 43 seats needed for a majority
- Turnout: 466,000
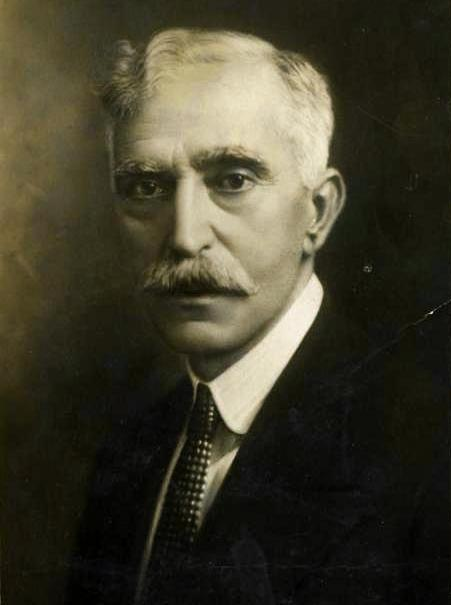

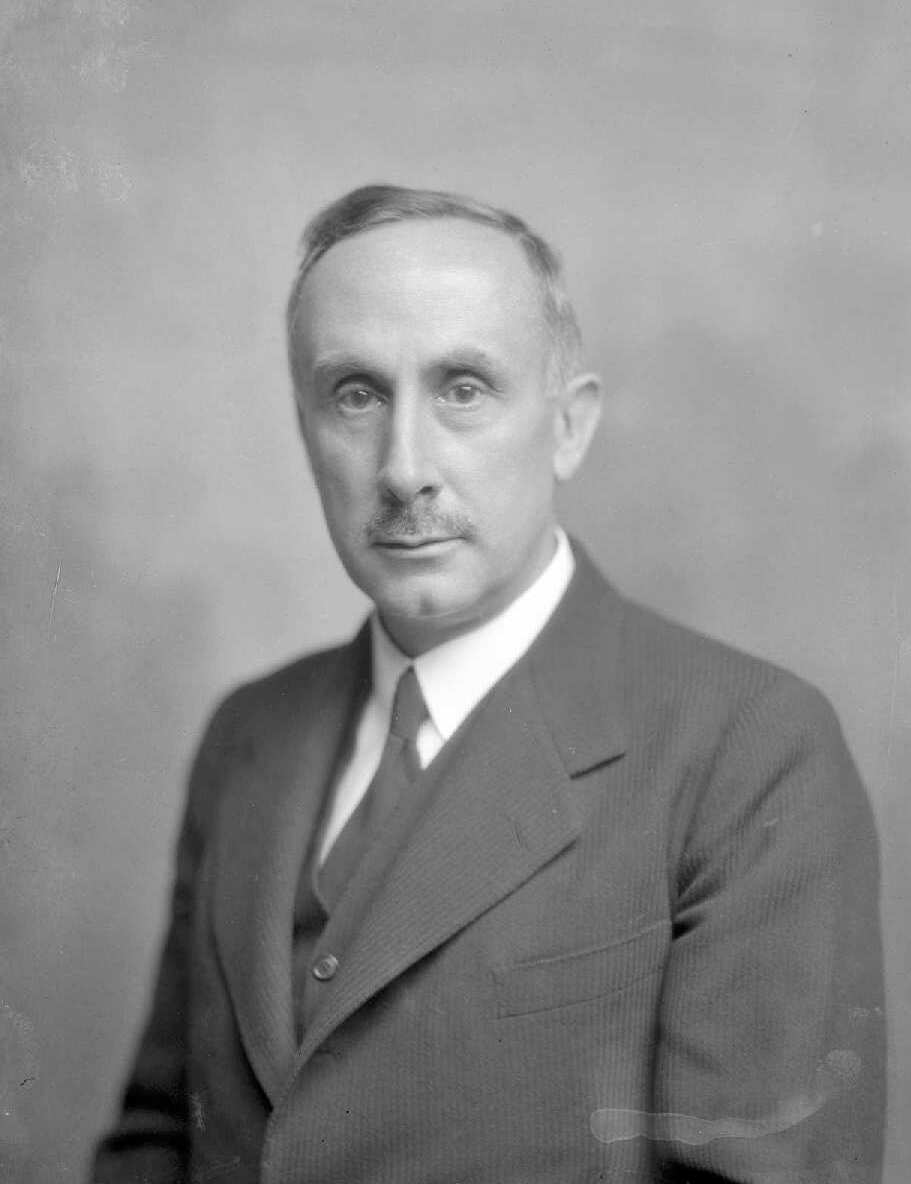

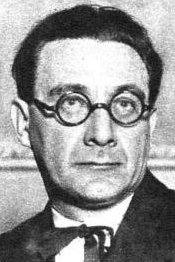
	First party	Second party	Third party
Leader	Francesc Macià	Joan Ventosa	Lluís Nicolau d'Olwer
Party	ERC	LR	PCR
Leader since	22 February 1931	N/A	22 March 1931
Leader's seat	Barcelona City	Barcelona City	(lost)
Seats won	67	17	1
Popular vote	224,800	138,500	39,100
Percentage	47.1 %	29.0 %	8.2 %
- Election results by province
President before election
Francesc Macià
ERC
Elected President
Francesc Macià
ERC

The 1932 Catalan regional election was held on 20 November 1932 to elect the first legislature of the Parliament of the autonomous region of Catalonia.

It was the sole Catalan parliamentary election held during the Second Spanish Republic (1931-1939). Between 1939 and 1980 the Parliament, as the rest of the institutions of the Generalitat of Catalonia, remained in exile as a consequence of the Republican defeat in the Spanish Civil War, and there wasn't another election until 1980.

All 85 seats in the Parliament were up for election. Despite the 1932 Statute of Autonomy and the Republican Constitution recognizing universal suffrage, suffrage was exceptionally restricted to men 23 years old or older. Notwithstanding, women had the right to get elected, none of which did. The Republican Left of Catalonia (ERC), led by the acting President of the Generalitat of Catalonia, Francesc Macià, was the winning party. the conservative Regionalist League, almost hegemonic in Catalonia during the reign of Alfonso XIII, reached the second place but far from the Republican Left. The third list was the Republican Catalanist Party, which won one seat.

== Results ==
Summary of the 20 November 1932 Parliament of Catalonia election results →
Parties and alliances	Popular vote		Seats
Parties and alliances	Votes	%	Seats
Catalan Left (Esquerra Catalana)	224,800	47.10	67
Republican Left of Catalonia (ERC)	224,800	47.10	56
Socialist Union of Catalonia (USC)	224,800	47.10	5
Radical Autonomist Party (PRA)	224,800	47.10	4
Federal Democratic Republican Party (PRDF)	224,800	47.10	1
Catalan Union (UC)	224,800	47.10	1
Citizen Concord (Concòrdia Ciutadana)	138,500	29.00	17
Regionalist League of Catalonia (LRC)	138,500	29.00	16
Democratic Union of Catalonia (UDC)	138,500	29.00	1
Left Coalition (Coalició d’Esquerres)	39,100	8.20	1
Catalan Republican Party (PCR)	39,100	8.20	1
Radical Socialist Republican Party (PRRS)	39,100	8.20	0
Catalan Party of Republican Action (PCAR)	39,100	8.20	0
Radical Republican Party (PRR)	25,900	5.40	0
Right of Catalonia (Dreta de Catalunya)	15,000	3.10	0
Traditionalist Communion (CT)	15,000	3.10	0
Spanish Renovation (RE)	15,000	3.10	0
Workers and Peasants' Bloc (BOC)	11,000	2.30	0
Federal Far-Left–Social Revolutionary Party (EEF–PSR)	6,400	1.30	0
Federal Democratic Republican Party (PRDF)	2,900	0.60	0
Communist Party of Catalonia (PCC)	1,700	0.40	0
Catalan Nationalist Party (PNC)	700	0.64	0
Spanish Socialist Workers' Party (PSOE)	500	0.82	0
Spanish Concord (CE)	100	0.30	0
Catalan State–Proletarian Party (EC–PP)	100	0.17	0
Total	2,056,974		85
Votes cast / turnout	466,700		
Abstentions			
Registered voters			

Popular vote
ERC	47.10%
Lliga	29.00%
Esquerres	8.20%
PRR	5.40%
Right	3.10%
BOC	2.30%
EEF–PSR	1.30%
Others	3.60%

Seats
ERC	78.82%
Lliga	20.00%
Esquerres	1.18%
