= Catalan Republic (1931) =

Short-lived state in Spain

Catalan Republic República Catalana (Catalan)
- 1931
- Senyera
- Anthem: Els Segadors (Catalan) "The Reapers"
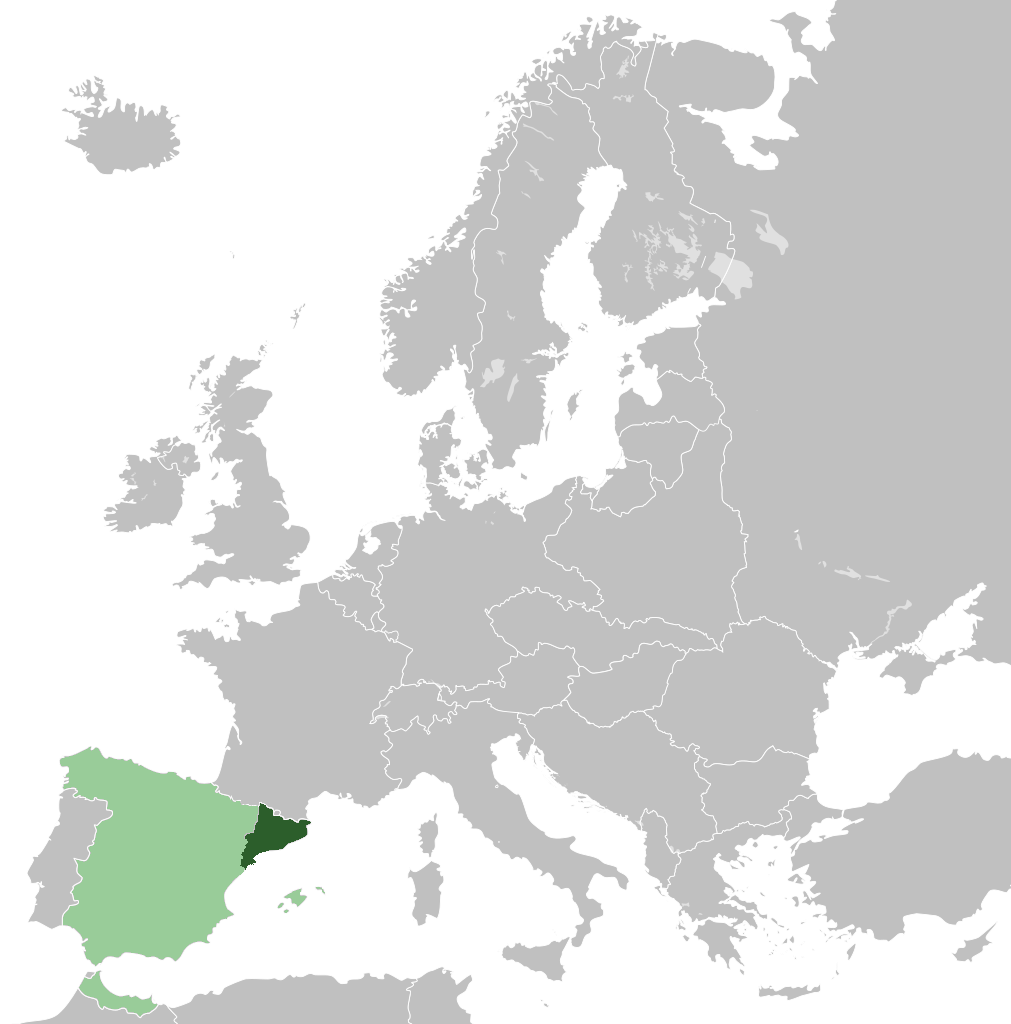
- Location of the Catalan Republic within Europe
- Status: Republic within Iberian Federation
- Capital: Barcelona
- Common languages: Catalan (official); Spanish (recognised)
- Demonym: Catalan
- Government: Unitary republic under provisional government
- President
  - 1931: Francesc Macià
- Historical era: Interwar period
  - Proclaimed: 14 April 1931
  - Establishment of the Generalitat: 17 April 1931
Preceded by	Succeeded by
Restoration (Spain)	Generalitat of Catalonia; Second Spanish Republic
- Today part of: Spain ∟ Catalonia

The Catalan Republic (Catalan: República Catalana, IPA: [rəˈpubːlikə kətəˈlanə]) was a state proclaimed in 1931 by Francesc Macià as the "Catalan Republic within the Iberian Federation", in the context of the proclamation of the Second Spanish Republic. It was proclaimed on 14 April 1931, and superseded three days later, on 17 April, by the Generalitat de Catalunya, the Catalan institution of self-government within the Spanish Republic.

== History ==
=== Background ===
After the abolition in 1925 of the Commonwealth of Catalonia (an administrative body shared by the four Catalan provinces, established in 1914) and the implementation of anti-Catalanist policies by the Dictatorship of Miguel Primo de Rivera, Catalan nationalism became radicalized and moving towards various degrees of left-wing positions, establishing or reinforcing already existing political parties such as Francesc Macià's pro-independence Estat Català, the Catalan Republican Party, Catalan Action or the Socialist Union of Catalonia, as well as trade unions such as the CADCI or the Unió de Rabassaires.

In 1926, Estat Català attempted to liberate Catalonia with a volunteer militia and establish an independent Catalan Republic, but the plot (with its headquarters in the border town of Prats de Molló, France) was discovered by the French police and aborted. Francesc Macià was arrested and judged in France, however, gaining popularity. The repression carried out by the Dictatorship facilitated a rapprochement between Catalan nationalism and Spanish republicanism, both targets of its policies.

=== Proclamation ===
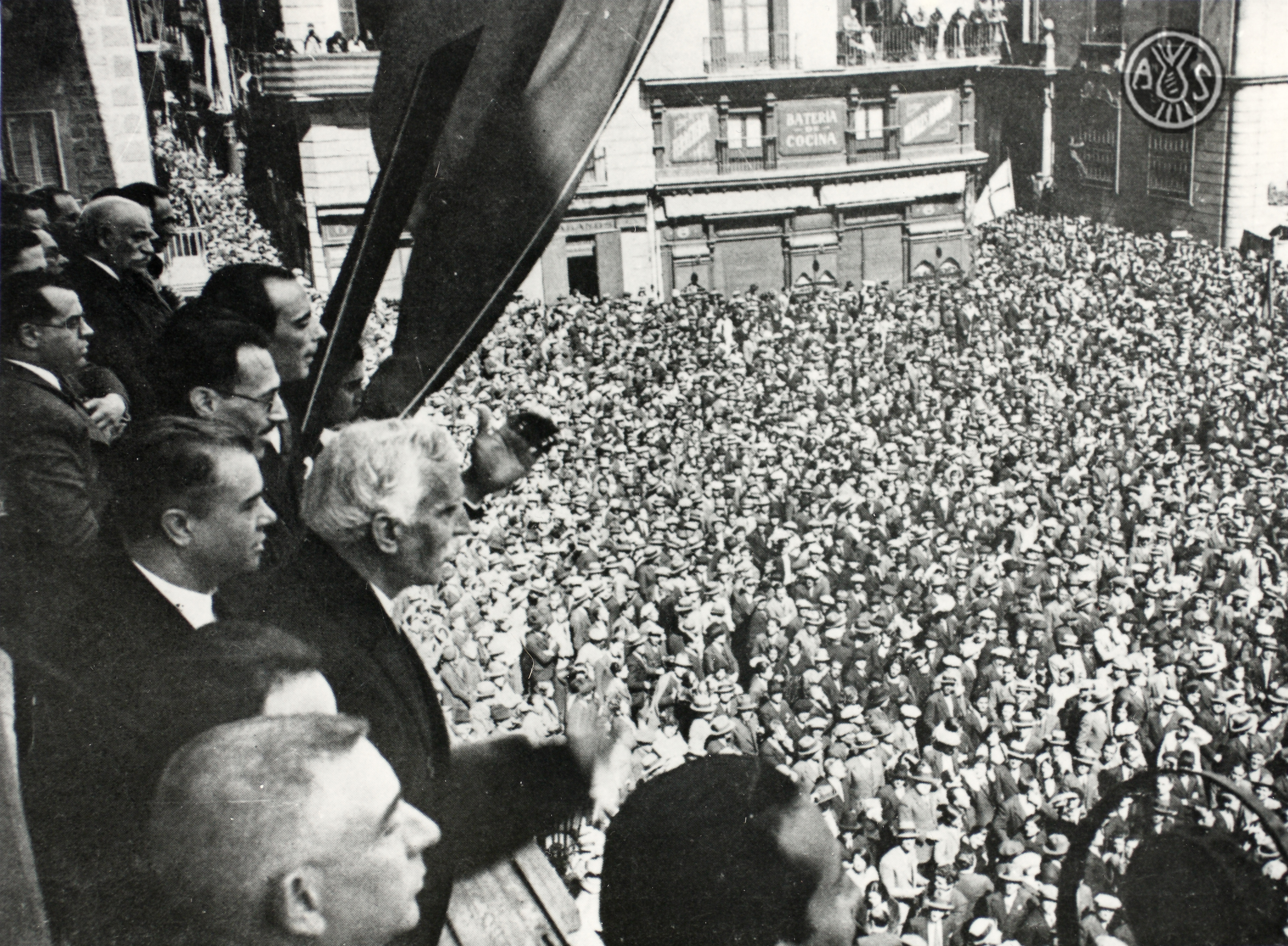
Proclamation of the Catalan Republic in Plaça de Sant Jaume by Francesc Macià, Barcelona, 14 April 1931

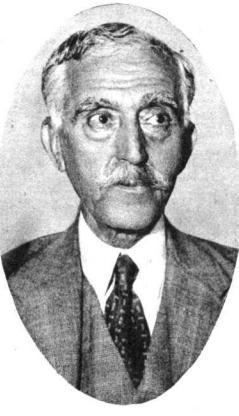
Francesc Macià i Llussà

Copy of the Proclamation of the Catalan Republic published on the afternoon of April 14

After the resignation of Primo de Rivera, Spanish republican parties agreed through the Pact of San Sebastián (17 August 1930) to prepare for a change of regime in case of victories in upcoming elections. In this project, there was a provision for the political autonomy of Catalonia, within the Spanish Republic. On 12 April 1931, local elections gave a large and unexpected majority in Catalonia (including Barcelona) to the Republican Left of Catalonia (Catalan: Esquerra Republicana de Catalunya, ERC), a party that had been founded three weeks earlier by the union of Macià's pro-independence Estat Català, the Catalan Republican Party, led by Lluís Companys, and the L'Opinió group. Two days later (14 April), few hours before the proclamation of the Second Spanish Republic in Madrid, ERC's leader, Francesc Macià, proclaimed the "Catalan Republic" from the balcony of the Palau de the Generalitat (then the seat of the Provincial Deputation of Barcelona), "expecting that the other peoples of Spain would constitute themselves as republics, in order to establish an Iberian Confederation". The proclamation of Macià was preceded by a proclamation of the Spanish Republic by another ERC member, Lluís Companys, from the balcony of the City Hall, and the Catalan and Spanish Republic flags were hoisted from the balcony. Francesc Macià proclaimed himself president of Catalonia, and ratified in this position by the elected councillors of Barcelona.

Macià immediately dismissed General Ignasi Despujol, chief of the Spanish Army in Catalonia, appointing in his place General López Ochoa, who was loyal to the new republican government, while Companys was designated civil governor of Barcelona and Jaume Aiguader became mayor of Barcelona. The jurist Josep Oriol Anguera de Sojo was appointed president of the Territorial Audience of Barcelona (the highest court of justice in Catalonia at the time). Helped by socialist Manuel Serra i Moret, he also appointed the ministers of the Catalan government, dominated by the Republican Left of Catalonia. He included among his ministers a member of the Radical Republican Party, a member of the UGT trade union, a member of Catalan Action, as well as two representatives from the Socialist Union of Catalonia, but none from the previously hegemonic and conservative Regionalist League (in the streets many citizens clamored against the leader of the League, chanting "Long live Macià and death to Cambó!"). Macià even offered a ministry to the anarchist trade union CNT, but the anarcho-syndicalist organization finally refused to participate, claiming its traditional apoliticism.

The provisional government of the Catalan Republic was made up of:

- President: Francesc Macià (Republican Left of Catalonia)
- Minister of Politics: Ventura Gassol (Republican Left of Catalonia)
- Minister of Instruction: Rafael Campalans (Socialist Union of Catalonia)
- Minister of Defence: Joan Casanovas (Republican Left of Catalonia)
- Minister of the Treasury: Casimir Giralt (Radical Republican Party)
- Minister of Economy and Work: Manuel Serra i Moret (Socialist Union of Catalonia)
- Minister of Communications: Manuel Carrasco i Formiguera (Catalan Action)
- Minister of Public Works: Salvador Vidal Rosell (Unión General de Trabajadores)

The next steps of the new Catalan Government involved taking control of the territory. It ordered every municipality in Catalonia to ensure the proclamation of the Republic. It also appointed delegates of the government in the provinces of Girona, Lleida and Tarragona. A volunteer militia, the Civic Republican Guard (Catalan: Guàrdia Cívica Republicana) was raised in order to protect the Palace of the Generalitat and the surroundings. On 15 April, a decree making Catalan the official language was passed. On the same day, Macià signed a decree allowing freedom of broadcast time to Ràdio Associació de Catalunya. On 16 April, the first issue of the Official Journal of the Catalan Republic (Diari Oficial de la República Catalana) was published.

On 17 April, three days after the proclamation, the provisional government of the new Spanish Republic, concerned about this proclamation and the duality of powers it created, sent three ministers (Fernando de los Ríos from the PSOE, Lluís Nicolau d'Olwer from Catalan Action and Marcel·lí Domingo from the Radical Socialist Republican Party) to Barcelona in order to negotiate with Macià and the Catalan provisional government. After some hours of intense debates, Macià reached an agreement with the three ministers, in which the government of the Catalan Republic was renamed the Generalitat of Catalonia (Catalan: Generalitat de Catalunya), becoming a Catalan institution of self-government within the Spanish Republic, that would be granted a Statute of Autonomy in 1932 after the elections for Spain's Parliament (Cortes Generales). Francesc Macià would become the President of the Generalitat of Catalonia (officially appointed in November 1932 by the newly elected Parliament of Catalonia), a position he held until his death on 25 December 1933.

== See also ==
- Catalan Republic (1640-1641)
- Events of 6 October
- Revolutionary Catalonia
- 1931 in Catalonia
- 1931 in Spain
- Catalan independence movement

== Sources and bibliography ==
- Sobrequés i Callicó, Jaume. Catalunya i la Segona República. Edicions d'Ara (Barcelona, 1983) ISBN 84-248-0793-6
- Pelegrí i Partegàs, Joan. Les primeres 72 hores de la República Catalana. Fundació President Macià (Barcelona, 1993) ISBN 84-604-7580-8
- Roglan, Joaquim. 14 d'abril: la Catalunya republicana (1931-1939). Cossetània Edicions (2006) ISBN 8497912039
- Fontana, Josep (2014). La formació d'una identitat. Una història de Catalunya. Ed. Eumo. ISBN 9788497665261.
