= Crop Contracts Law =

Agrarian reform passed by the Parliament of Catalonia in 1934

The Crop Contracts Law (Catalan: Llei de Contractes de Conreu) was a law passed by the Parliament of Catalonia on 21 March 1934, and enacted on the symbolic date of 14 April 1934. The basic purpose of the law was to protect the tenant farmers from the Rabassa Morta ("dead strain"), a special type of land leasing for vineyards in Catalonia, and promote their access to the land they were cultivating. The Crop Contracts Law was not implemented because it was revoked by the Court of Constitutional Guarantees of the Spanish Government. The negotiation that followed between the Spanish and Catalan governments was interrupted by the Events of 6 October, the proclamation of the Catalan State, and the arrest of Catalan President Lluís Companys.

== Background ==
The Rabassa Morta ("Dead strain" in Catalan) was a type of contract that was widespread in Catalonia, whereby a lessee rabassaire ("Strain lessee") rented a portion of land to grow vines, on the condition that the contract was dissolved if one-third of the first strains planted had died. The legal nature of this contract was discussed: while some considered it a rental of the land, others (the majority) considered it a long-term lease.

In the eighteenth century, there was an increase in the value of the land at the same time that inflation soared. The landowners considered themselves harmed by the improvements in agricultural methods that prolonged the life of the vineyards, while the rent lost value and extended for several generations.

The conflict was resolved in favor of the owners, when the Barcelona Provincial Court ruled in 1756, that the contract would be dissolved by either the death of the vineyards, or fifty years after its signing, later confirmed by the Civil Code of 1889. The system was the source of several disputes, especially after the arrival of phylloxera, an agricultural disease affecting vines, which originated in France in the late nineteenth century. The movement of the agricultural disease into Catalonia during the late 1800s and early 1900s led to the widespread destruction of the areas grapevines, and consequently, the replacement of prevalent European native strains with those of American origin. Difficulties for those working the land where compounded, as the new vine strains proved to be significantly shorter-lived than the vines they replaced. Thus, the contracts were completed in a very short time and the landowners, seeing that the cultivation of the vine was no longer profitable, expelled the rabassieres to cultivate other plantations. On the other hand, the rabassaires maintained that the replanted vineyards were the same old strain, which could perpetuate the life of the vineyard. This led to an effective gridlock in the dispute between the landowners and rabassaires.

== Approval ==
In December 1933, the president of the Government of Catalonia, Francesc Macià, was replaced by Lluís Companys, one of the founders of the Unió de Rabassaires, whose main objective was access to the land of the rabassieres tenants. Company's immediately stated his intention to carry out an agrarian reform adapted to the specificity of the Catalan countryside, especially in the sector of the vineyard, in which some 70,000 small farmers dedicated to the cultivation of grapes did not have ownership of the land, but cultivating it under the rabassa morta and ran the risk of being evicted from the land.

On 21 March 1934, the Parliament of Catalonia unanimously approved the Crop Contracts Law by the deputies present — those of the Catalan League, a new denomination of the veteran Regionalist League of Catalonia, were absent. The new law was equivalent of the State "law of leases" that could not be approved by the Cortes Generales in the summer of 1933, which guaranteed to the rabassaires the exploitation of lands for a minimum of six years and the right to access the property of the plots that they had been cultivating uninterruptedly for more than eighteen years.

== Annulment ==
The Crop Contracts Law was met with radical opposition from the Catalan Agricultural Institute of San Isidro, which grouped the most important landowners, and the Regionalist League of Catalonia, who asked the government of the Radical Republican Party of Ricardo Samper, that the League and the CEDA supported in Cortes Generales, to appeal the law before the Court of Constitutional Guarantees, which it did on 4 May. The appeal was based on the invasion of state powers, those referring to contractual obligations, that Article 15 of the Constitution of 1931 reserved to the State, while the Government of Catalonia argued that by virtue of Article 12 of the Statute, it corresponded to the legislation in matters of agrarian social policy, that the government's argument was the lack of powers of the Parliament to place the evidence to the League "It put forward the defense of the economic interests of its potential voters to that of the autonomic powers, contradicting the desire expressed in its programmatic declaration of 1933 to aspire to a formula of much wider autonomy".

On 8 June 1934, the Court of Guarantees declared, by 13 votes to 10 and without many of its members having heard the case, that the Parliament of Catalonia was incompetent on the subject and thus annulled the law. The response by the Government of Catalonia was the approval by the Parliament of Catalonia of a virtually identical law on June 12.

== Conflict between the Central Government and the Government of Catalonia ==
The annulment of the Crop Contracts Law created a serious political crisis between Madrid and Barcelona, including the withdrawal of the Republican Left of Catalonia deputies from the Cortes Generales, to which the Basque Nationalist Party added in a show of solidarity faithful to its line of agrarian social justice, which it tried to apply in Navarre, and a considerable nationalist exacerbation, which favored the paramilitary activities and the separatist propaganda of the Joventuts d'Estat Català, directed by Josep Dencàs. Dencàs managed the Ministry of the Interior and on 18 September, retaliating against the anarcho-syndicalist movement in Barcelona, while Miquel Badia, of the Republican Left of Catalonia, was commissioned to the Public Order services of Catalonia.

However, since neither of the two governments wanted to start a new confrontation, representatives of the same negotiated over the summer the introduction of amendments in the regulation that the law had to develop. But the agreement reached between Samper and Companys was broken when the new government headed by Alejandro Lerroux was set up in Madrid at the beginning of October and three CEDA ministers were part of it. The Revolution of October 1934 began immediately afterwards, in which Companys was one of the protagonists of the Events of 6 October, in which the Catalan State was proclaimed within the "Federal" Spanish Republic. The failure of the proclamation led to the imprisonment of Companys, the dissolution of his government, and the suspension of the Statute of Autonomy.

The Crop Contracts Law was annulled and almost 3,000 eviction lawsuits of rabassaires and sharecroppers were processed.

It was again put into effect after the victory of the Popular Front in the 1936 Spanish general election, which restored its duties to the Government and Parliament of Catalonia.

== Bibliography ==
- De la Granja, José Luis; Beramendi, Justo; Anguera, Pere (2001). La España de los nacionalismos y las autonomías. Madrid: Síntesis. ISBN 84-7738-918-7.
- Jackson, Gabriel (1976) [1965]. La República Española y la Guerra Civil, 1931-1939 [The Spanish Republic and the Civil War, 1931-1939] (2nd ed.). Barcelona: Crítica. ISBN 84-7423-006-3.
- La España de los nacionalismos y las autonomias. ISBN 84-7738-918-7.
