= Catalan revolt =

Catalan revolt may refer to a number of revolts in Catalonia:

- Reapers' War (1640–1659)
- Revolt of the Barretinas (1687–1689)
- Rising during the War of the Spanish Succession (1705–1714)
- War of the Matiners (1846–1849)
- Catalan State (1934), during the Events of 6 October (1934)
- Revolutionary Catalonia, during the Spanish Civil War (1936–1939)
- 2017 Catalan independence referendum
