= Domènec Batet =

Domènec Batet i Mestres
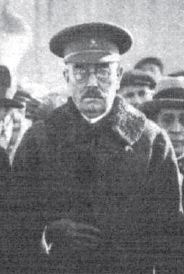
- Domingo Batet photographed in 1931
- Born: August 30, 1872; Tarragona, Catalonia, Spain
- Died: February 18, 1937 (aged 64); Burgos, Castile and León, Spain
- Military career
- Allegiance: Spain (1887–1931); Spanish Republic (1931–1937)
- Service years: 1887–1936
- Rank: General
- Conflicts: Cuban War of Independence; Events of October the 6th Spanish Civil War
- Awards: Laureate Cross of Saint Ferdinand

Domènec Batet i Mestres (Spanish: Domingo Batet Mestres; August 30, 1872 – February 18, 1937) was a Spanish military man who became general of the Spanish Army.

Starting as a lieutenant, Batet quickly escalated ranks during the Cuban War of Independence. After the Disaster of Annual, as a colonel, Batet took part in the investigation of the defeat taking part in the drafting of the Picasso File. During the Second Spanish Republic, Domènec Batet was designated chief of the IV Organic Division in Catalonia and crushed the Catalan Uprising of October the 6th. With the outbreak of the Spanish Civil War Batet remained loyal to the Republic and was deployed in Burgos, where his subordinates betrayed him and captured him for the Nationalists. After months of captivity, Franco ordered the execution of Batet.

== Biography ==
=== Early military career ===
Domènec Batet i Mestres started his career in the Spanish Army as a volunteer lieutenant in the Cuban War of Independence. During the war, he received decorations and was promoted multiple times. He also developed a pacifist ideology.

After that, during the Rif War, as a colonel he was one of the instruction judges who wrote the Picasso Files, a report directed by Juan Picasso González that pointed out the corruption of the African deployed Spanish officers, including Francisco Franco.

=== The Catalan uprising ===
Shortly after the proclamation of the Second Spanish Republic, Domènec Betet was deployed in Catalonia as chief of the IV Organic Division. In that position Batet was always deferent with the Generalitat of Catalonia, treated the soldiers well and promoted the use of the Catalan language between them.

In 1932, Batet led the repression of the general strike of the Alt Llobregat. Instead of using terror tactics, ordered by Manuel Azaña, he acted quickly and avoided unnecessary bloodshed.

Batet then played a most important role during the Republican years with the successful suffocation of the Events of October the 6th, a Catalan attempt at secession in 1934. The Catalan uprising was fuelled by multiple issues, the most important: the inclusion of anti-republican ministers of the CEDA, a right wing Spanish political party that won the 1933 elections, and the cancellation of the Law of Contracts of Cultivation (Llei de Contractes de Conreu). This law was approved by the government of Lluís Companys and later on banned by the Spanish government, arguing that it exceeded the Statute of Autonomy of Catalonia of 1932. The Law of Contracts of Cultivation protected the peasants and when the Spanish government banned it infuriated the Catalan working class.

On October 5, 1934, a general strike collapsed several cities of Spain. The following day, Lluís Companys decided to declare the Catalan Republic and numerous heavily armed squads occupied the streets of Barcelona and other towns, supporting the initiative and capturing public offices. Lluís Companys also telephoned Domènec Batet, asking for support, but Batet remained loyal to the central government and gained some time demanding a written request. While Companys wrote the request, Batet prepared the Army, Guardia Civil, and Guardia de Asalto troops and directly attacked the Palau de la Generalitat de Catalunya. He was able to avoid any major confrontation with the militias in armed revolt and Mossos d'Esquadra, because they were ordered not to attack until they were told to do so. Batet managed to surround the building, breaking the Catalan government chain of command, and shoot multiple warning shots with a howitzer. After 10 hours, isolated from the militiamen and Mossos d'Esquadra (who could not receive orders from the rebel Catalan leadership), Lluís Companys was forced to surrender.

Acting as he did, Batet minimised any casualties that might have been caused and used minimal force to fulfil the orders of the official Spanish government. Some sources say that in order to avoid further fights against his own people, Batet asked to be redeployed somewhere else; while others claim that he was ordered to a change of position as a punishment for his passivity during the confrontation. In any case, Niceto Alcalá-Zamora transferred him to Burgos.

=== Spanish Civil War and execution ===
On June 13, 1936, Batet was transferred to the Organic Division of Burgos, where the general Emilio Mola, leader of the Nationalist faction, was also deployed. When the Spanish Civil War started, Batet was betrayed by his own men and they imprisoned him. While Mola, who respected Batet as a military man, was the leader of the Nationalists, Batet was kept in prison. When Franco became the Generalissimo of the Nationalist forces he ordered the execution of Batet, according to leftist sources, in retaliation for the Picasso Files, where Batet accused Franco of corruption during the Rif War.

== See also ==
- Francesc Macià
- Mossos d'Esquadra
- Juan Prim y Prats
- 1926 Spanish coup d'état

== Bibliography ==
- Gonzàlez, Arnau; López, Manel; Ucelay, Enric, eds. (2014). 6 d'octubre. La desfeta de la revolució catalanista de 1934 (in Catalan). Barcelona: Editorial Base. ISBN 978-84-16166-19-0.
- Finestres, Jordi; López, Manel (2014). "Entre la revolució i l'estelada". Sàpiens (in Catalan). Barcelona. ISSN 1695-2014.
