= Josep Dencàs =

Spanish/Catalan political and paramilitary leader

Josep Dencàs i Puigdollers
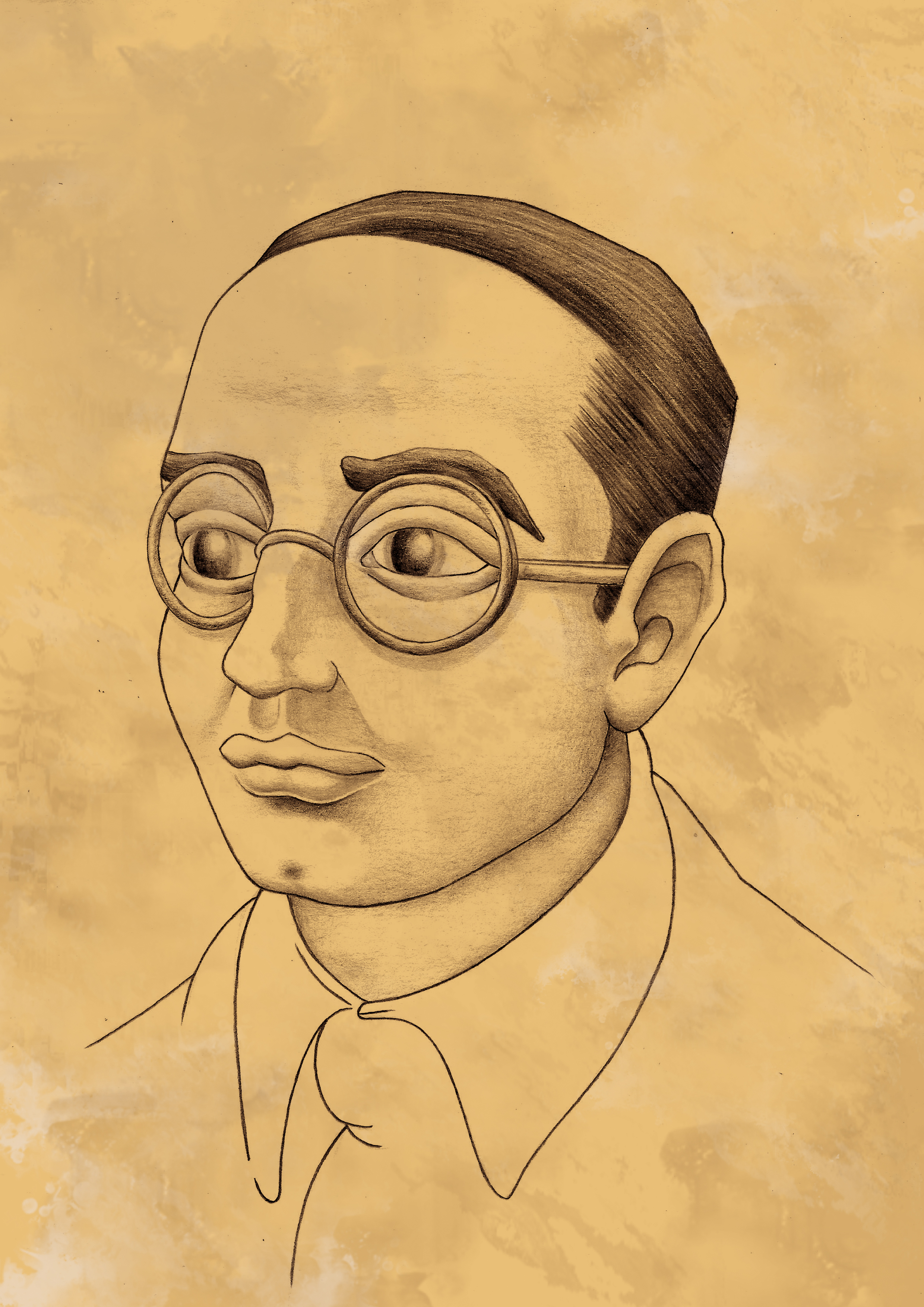
- Born: March 19, 1900; Vic, Spain
- Died: 13 February 1966 (aged 65); Tangiers, Morocco
- Occupations: Politician; Medical doctor

Josep Dencàs i Puigdollers (March 19, 1900 – February 13, 1966) was a Catalan nationalist politician active in the Republican Left of Catalonia.

A supporter of Catalan independence movement, he served as interior minister of short-lived Catalan State during the turbulent Events of 6 October. He was considered a leading figure of the Catalan version of fascism.

== Biography ==
He was born in Vic on March 19, 1900 in a family of pharmacists. He studied at the University of Barcelona, where he graduated in medicine.

=== Political career ===
Dencàs participated in the establishment of an earlier Catalan Republic (and the Second Spanish Republic) in 1931, having participated in the founding of the Republican Left of Catalonia (ERC) a few days earlier. He was elected ERC deputy for the Barcelona district in the general elections of June 1931 and in the first elections to the Parliament of Catalonia, in 1932. During these months he focused on organizing the Republican Youth of Catalonia (JEREC), with the aim of gaining influence within the ERC itself. He was also behind the creation of paramilitary groups, the "Escamots", which Dencàs himself led.

In December 1932, he was appointed Minister of Health and Social Assistance in the government of Francesc Macià and later Minister of the Interior in the first government of Lluis Companys in January 1934. As head of police, he implemented a brutal campaign of repression against the anarchists of the CNT-FAI. Influenced by the ultranationalist and racist ideas of Pere Màrtir Rossell i Vilar, Dencàs defined himself as a "national socialist." He was considered one of the most violent leaders of the JEREC.

He was instrumental in the preparation for the 1934 proclamation of the independent Catalan State separate from Spain. The new state however only lasted ten hours, after which the forces loyal to the Madrid government managed to quash the rebellion. After this failure, he went into exile, escaping through the sewers of Barcelona. His performance as Minister of the Interior was widely criticized for fleeing while other groups fought to the end. In fact, the British writer Gerald Brenan in his book The Spanish Labyrinth accused him of collusion with the Spanish right-wing, in particular with José María Gil-Robles y Quiñones. According to Ramón Ardit, after the surrender, the resisting Catalans said they wanted to "kill Dencàs."

=== Later life ===
Exiled in France, he was arrested by the French authorities and released shortly after. In 1936 when Spanish Republican authorities restored the Catalonian government, Companys re-appointed some former officials but Dencàs, as he was blamed for the previous unsuccessful uprising.

Dencàs returned to Catalonia in 1936 and led Estat Català to split from ERC. The outbreak of the Spanish Civil War surprised him in Barcelona and he did not play a role in the war. The anarchists of CNT-FAI drove him out of Barcelona in mid-August 1936, when he boarded an Italian steamer. Shortly after, on August 15, the Estat Català party expelled him from the party.

Initially, he went into exile in Italy under Benito Mussolini, which reinforced accusations of collusion with fascists, although he soon moved to France again.

Some authors such as Jacinto Toryho have suggested that he was involved in 1936 Catalan coup d'état attempt, through his contacts with Italian fascists. Later he settled in Morocco, where he worked as a doctor at a charitable medical center subsidized by the Real Estate Bank of Morocco which founded by the also exiled ERC leader Josep Andreu Abelló. He died of cancer in Tangier in 1966.
