= Court of Cassation (Catalonia) =

Highest court of Catalonia (1934–1939)

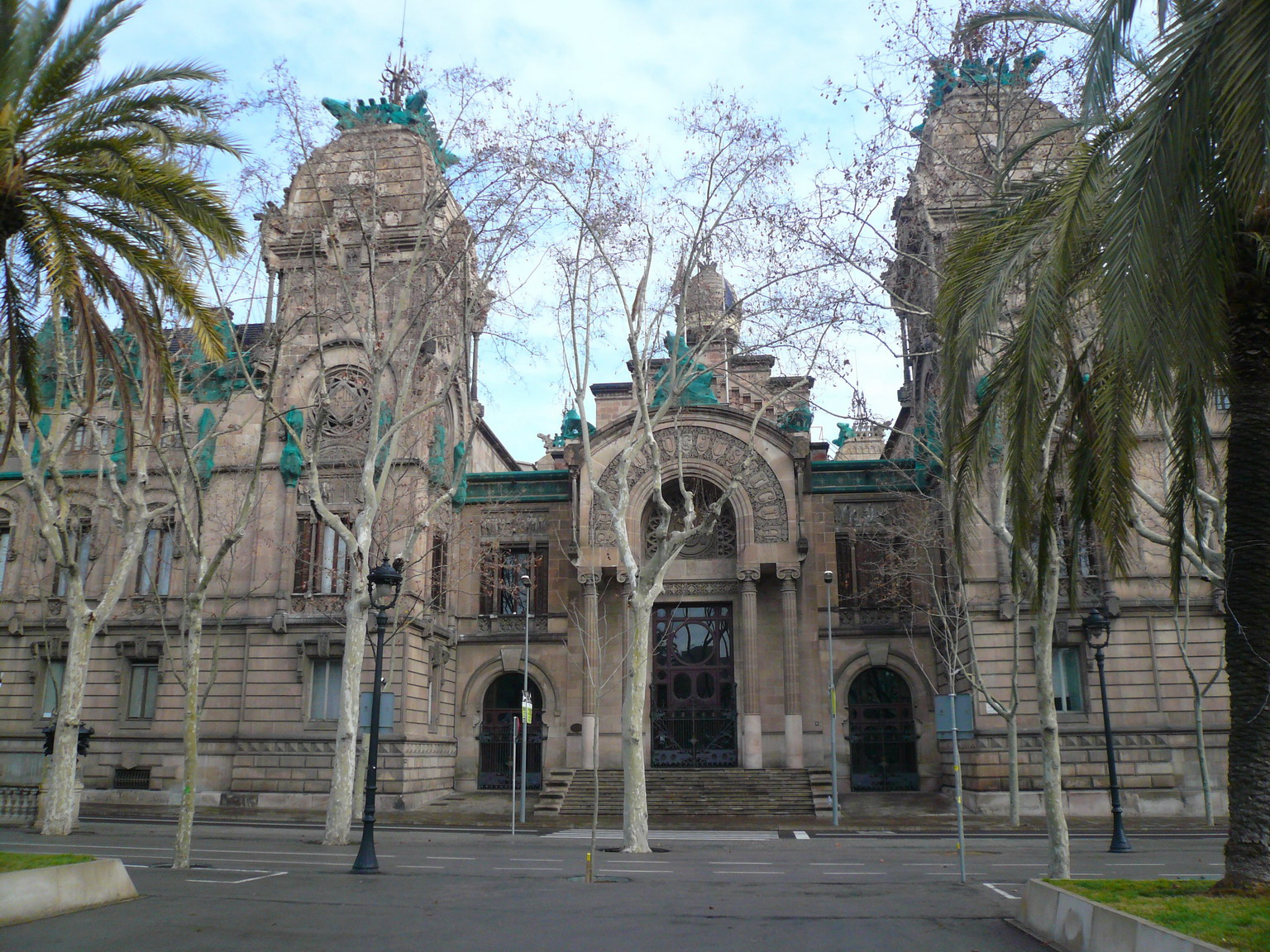
The Palau de Justícia de Barcelona, located on the Passeig de Lluís Companys (Barcelona) was the seat of the Court of Cassation of Catalonia

Tribunal de Cassació (Catalan for Court of Cassation) was the Generalitat of Catalonia's highest court of justice during the Second Spanish Republic, founded in 1934, and established according to the Statute of Autonomy of Catalonia of 1932. It had jurisdiction over administrative and civil law cases. Catalan was the working language of the Court.

Its first President was Santiago Gubern i Fàbregas (Barcelona, 1875 - 1960). In September 1936, after the outbreak of Spanish Civil War, Josep Andreu i Abelló (Montblanc, 1906 - Madrid, 1993) was appointed president of the Court of Cassation.

In 1939, once Catalonia was occupied by the nationalist armies of general Francisco Franco during the last stages of the Civil War, its regime abolished the Generalitat, including the Court of Cassation and all of its Court judgments, which were declared without legal force until 1984, five years after the restoration of Catalan self-government.

== Bibliography ==
- Roca i Trias, Encarna. El tribunal de Cassació de la Generalitat republicana: La història d'una tradició prohibida, 2009, 18 pages from a conference (in Catalan)
