= Pact of San Sebastián =

Meeting led by Niceto Alcalá Zamora and Miguel Maura

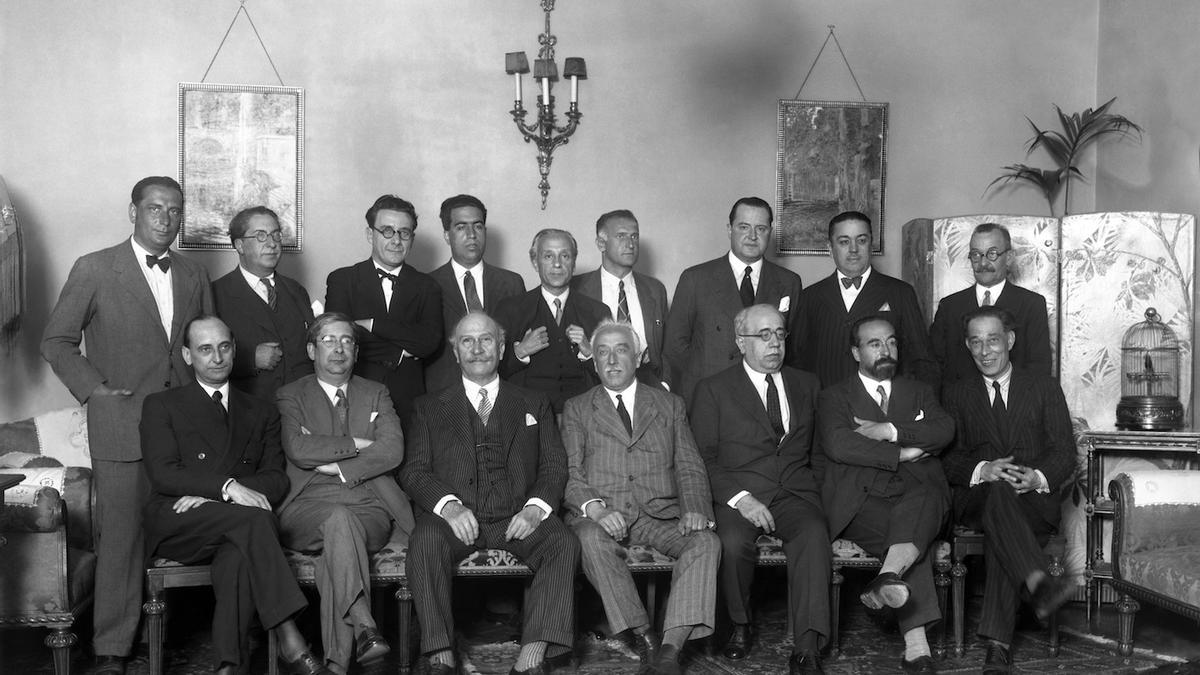
- Photograph of the Pact of San Sebastián meeting, 17 August 1930

- Native name: Pacto de San Sebastián
- Date: 17 August 1930
- Location: San Sebastián, Spain; 43.32°N 1.99°W
- Type: Meeting
- Cause: Harsh leadership under Primo de Rivera's government
- Motive: Form a revolutionary committee and overthrow the government
- Outcome: Failed military coup

The Pact of San Sebastián (Spanish: Pacto de San Sebastián) was a meeting led by Niceto Alcalá-Zamora and Miguel Maura, which took place in San Sebastián, Spain, on 17 August 1930. Representatives from practically all republican political movements in Spain at the time attended the meeting. This meeting led to the failed military coup on 12 December 1930 in an attempt to overthrow the government run by Alfonso XIII.

== Attendees ==
Presided over by Fernando Sasiaín (representative of the Unión Republicana), the attendees included:

Attendee	Photo	Party
Alejandro Lerroux		Radical Republican Party
Manuel Azaña		Republican Action
Marcelino Domingo		Radical Socialist Republican Party
Álvaro de Albornoz		Radical Socialist Republican Party
Ángel Galarza		Radical Socialist Republican Party
Niceto Alcalá Zamora		Liberal Republican Right
Miguel Maura		Liberal Republican Right
Manuel Carrasco Formiguera		Catalan Action
Macià Mallol Bosch		Republican Action of Catalonia
Jaume Aiguader		Estat Català
Santiago Casares Quiroga		Autonomous Galician Republican Organization
Indalecio Prieto		Independent
Felipe Sánchez Román		Independent
Fernando de los Ríos		Independent
Eduardo Ortega y Gasset		Independent

Gregorio Marañón was not able to attend, but sent a letter associating himself with the group.

== Meeting ==
At the meeting, a "revolutionary committee" was formed, headed by Alcalá-Zamora; this committee eventually became the first provisional government of the Second Spanish Republic. The committee was in close contact with a group of soldiers, with the intent of bringing about a military coup in favor of a republic. The coup was set for 15 December 1930. Nonetheless, Captain Fermín Galán attempted to start the uprising on 12 December, which resulted in the failure of the coup. Galán and Captain Ángel García Hernández were executed by a firing squad.
