= Events of 6 October =

1934 general strike, armed insurgency, and declaration of a Catalan state

- Part of the Revolution of 1934
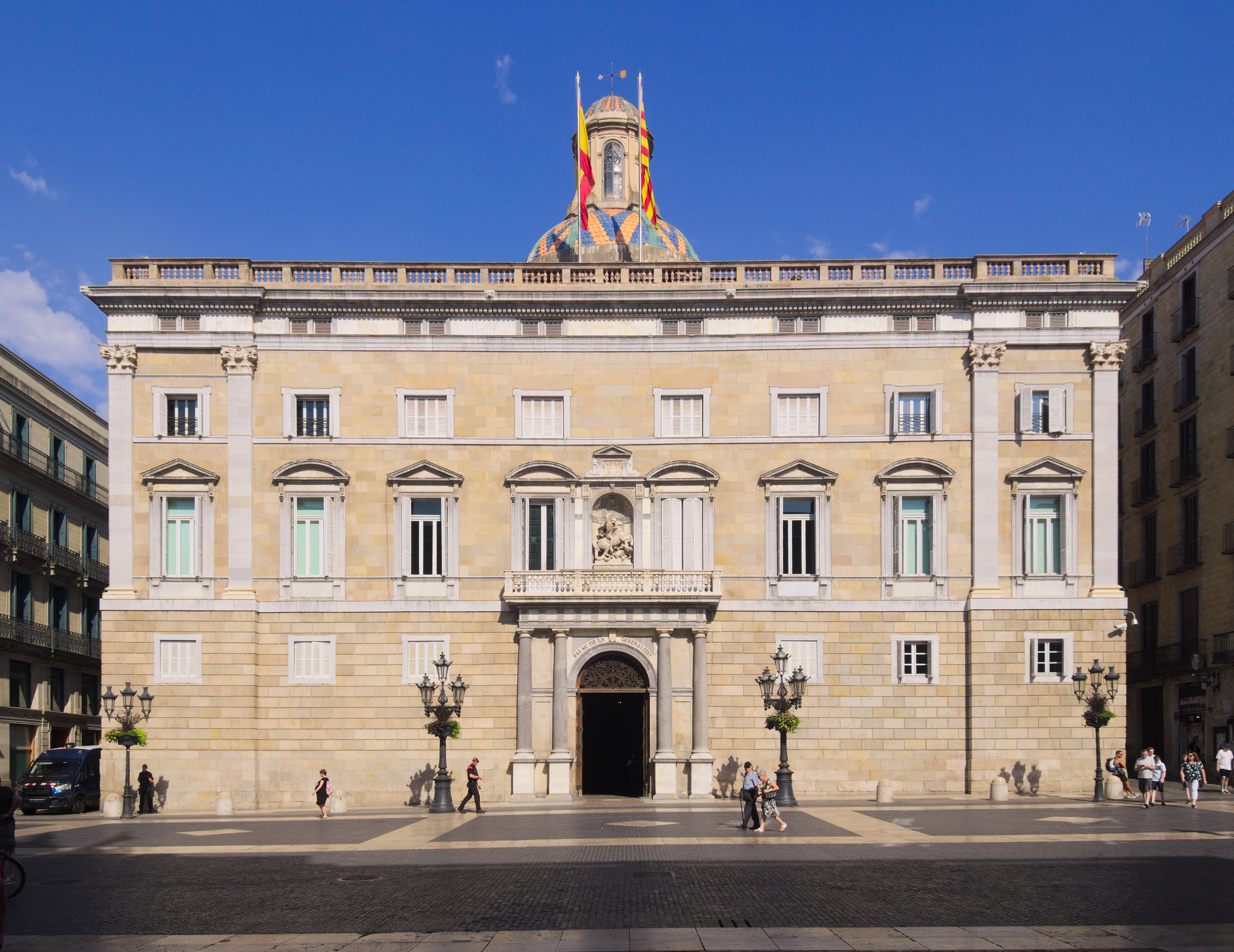
- Palau de la Generalitat de Catalunya
Date	5-10 October 1934
Location	Catalonia
Result	Spanish government victory

Belligerents
Generalitat of Catalonia (self-proclaimed Catalan State): Escamots; Worker's Alliance	(Second Spanish Republic) Spanish Republic: Spanish Army

Commanders and leaders
Lluís Companys; Josep Dencàs	Alejandro Lerroux; Domènec Batet

Casualties and losses
- 74 dead, 252 wounded

The events of 6 October (Catalan: Fets del sis d'octubre) were a general strike, armed insurgency and declaration of a Catalan State in Catalonia during the Revolution of 1934 on 6 October 1934.

The predominantly left-wing Generalitat of Catalonia led by President Lluís Companys declared the Catalan State in reaction to the inclusion of the right-wing CEDA party in the Spanish Republican government of Alejandro Lerroux. Companys declared a Catalan State within a "Spanish Federal Republic" in Barcelona with support from a general strike called by the General Union of Workers. General Domènec Batet declared martial law and the Spanish Army attacked the Palau de la Generalitat de Catalunya and other government buildings in Barcelona, causing Companys to surrender on the morning of 7 October. Catalonia's Statute of Autonomy was suspended while Companys and his government were imprisoned until the left-wing Popular Front government came to power in 1936.

== Background ==
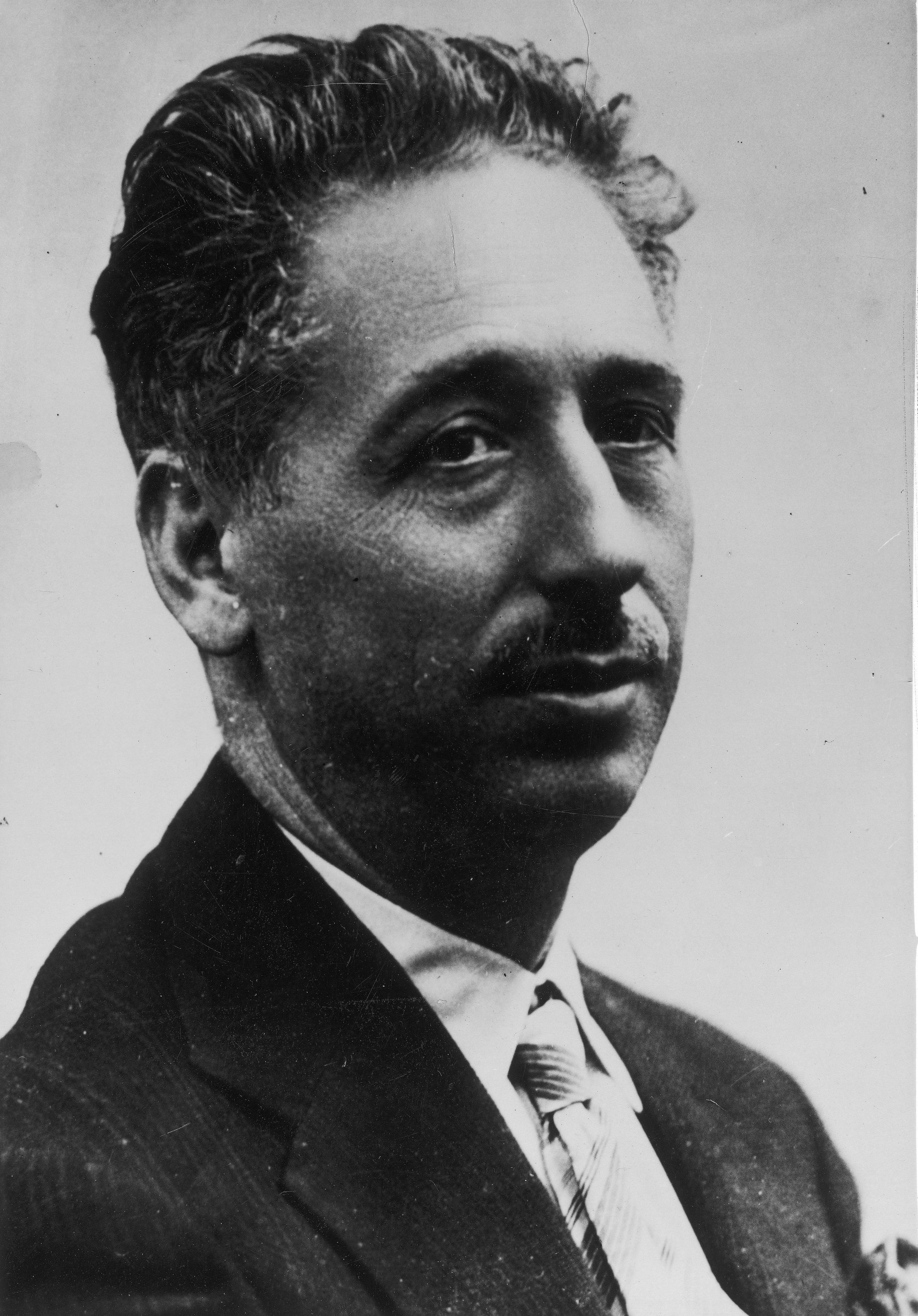
Lluís Companys

=== Spain ===
In the 1933 general election of the Second Spanish Republic, left-wing parties lost heavily, and the newly formed conservative Spanish Confederation of the Autonomous Right (CEDA), led by José María Gil Robles, became the largest party with 115 seats in the Cortes Generales. Nevertheless, incoming prime minister Alejandro Lerroux formed a government which excluded CEDA and was dominated by his Radical Republican Party (RRP), which came second place with 102 seats. Lerroux resigned in April 1934 to be replaced by Ricardo Samper, a member of the RRP and one of his chief lieutenants. A summer of strikes and social conflict led Gil Robles to withdraw CEDA support from the Samper government and demand participation in government. President Niceto Alcalá Zamora, unwilling to call new elections, instructed Lerroux to form a new government, which was announced on 4 October 1934 and included three CEDA members. Left-wing republicans denounced the "betrayal" of the Republic and the General Union of Workers (UGT), a powerful Marxist trade union, called a general strike.

On 5 October, the general strike began in places across Spain including Madrid, Seville, Córdoba and Zaragoza. There was fighting in some places, including Mondragón and Eibar in the Basque Country. There were also clashes in Madrid, but in general, planned uprisings failed to materialise or were quickly put down, and members of the Spanish military and of the Guardia Civil did not, as hoped, join the rebels. Outside of Catalonia, the only significant military action took place in Asturias where, in the early hours of 6 October, activists took hold of Avilés, Gijón and the centre of Oviedo, as well as Guardia Civil barracks in mining areas, beginning the Asturian miners' strike of 1934 and the "October Revolution".

=== Catalonia ===
Following the establishment of the Second Spanish Republic in 1931, a Statute of Autonomy established Catalonia as an autonomous region, but it was passed only after two important concessions that kept control of taxation and education vested in Madrid. Elections were held in November 1932 to a new Parliament of Catalonia, which were won by the Republican Left of Catalonia (ERC), with Francesc Macià becoming President of Catalonia.

In January 1933, the appointment of Adolf Hitler as Chancellor of Germany was met with anxiety by the Spanish left. Catalonia saw the formation of the Alianza Obrera (Workers' Alliance), an anti-fascist organisation among whose aims was preparation for a revolution to establish a "federal" Spanish republic. When Macià died at Christmas, Lluís Companys was elected president of Catalonia a week later on 1 January 1934. The ERC won the Catalan election of 1934, bucking the trend in Spain where a shift to the right was the norm. The implementation of the Statute of Autonomy was seen to be threatened by the CEDA success in the 1933 election and its entry into government on 4 October 1934. In addition, the rejection by the Constitutional Court of Spain of the emancipatory Crop Contracts Law land reform passed by the Parliament of Catalonia on 14 April 1934, which protected the tenant farmers and granted access to the land they were cultivating, was seen as a direct attack to both social progress and Catalan self-government, thus rising tensions.

On 5 October the general strike was declared in various Catalan towns, among them Sabadell, Vilanova i la Geltrú, Granollers, Mataró or Badalona. Crowds of workers and peasants claimed for the proclamation of the Catalan Republic, a move that was approved by the city councils of some of the afformentioned towns, which proceeded to hoist the estelada (Catalan pro-independence flag) and the red flag from their balconies.

== 6 October ==
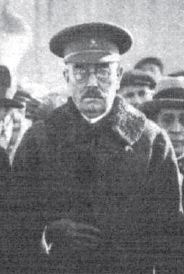
Domènec Batet

The general strike in Catalonia was organised by the Alianza Obrera, working alongside the Escamots (squads), a paramilitary adjunct to the ERC. Josep Dencàs, the Catalan minister of security, in theory had 70,000 armed Escamots at his disposal, but they were ill-prepared for the fighting. Companys was thought to be having talks with former left-wing Spanish prime minister Manuel Azaña, who had gone to Barcelona, with a view to declaring the government deposed and creating a provisional government of a federal Spanish republic in Barcelona. In fact, Azaña met with the Catalan committee of his Republican Left party and it was agreed to oppose any such action. He then left his hotel and stayed with a friend. Companys telephoned Domènec Batet, the military commander of Barcelona, to ask him to put his forces at the disposal of the new republic. Batet was non-committal.

At 8 p.m., Companys appeared on a balcony of the Palau de la Generalitat to proclaim the "Catalan State within the Spanish Federal Republic," told the crowd that "monarchists and fascists" had "assaulted the government", and went on:

In this solemn hour, in the name of the people and the Parliament, the Government over which I preside assumes all the faculties of power in Catalonia, proclaims the Catalan State of the Spanish Federal Republic, and in establishing and fortifying relations with the leaders of the general protest against Fascism, invites them to establish in Catalonia the provisional Government of the Republic, which will find in our Catalan people the most generous impulse of fraternity in the common desire to erect a liberal and magnificent federal republic.

An hour later, General Batet declared martial law. He moved against trade union and militia headquarters, both of whom surrendered quickly, then brought light artillery to bear against the Barcelona city hall and the Generalitat. Fighting continued until 6 am, when Companys surrendered.

== Aftermath ==
Companys and his government were arrested, as well as Manuel Azaña despite his having taken no part in the events; he was released in December. Some towns, such as Sabadell, remained loyal to the Catalan State until 10 October.

The Statute of Autonomy was suspended indefinitely on 14 December, and all powers that had been transferred to Barcelona were returned to Madrid. In June 1935, Companys was sentenced to thirty years in prison. Following the 1936 Spanish general election, the new left-wing Popular Front government of Manuel Azaña released Companys and his government from jail.
