= Catalan State (1934) =

Short-lived state

Catalan State Estat Català (Catalan) Estado Catalán (Spanish)
- 1934
- Flag Seal

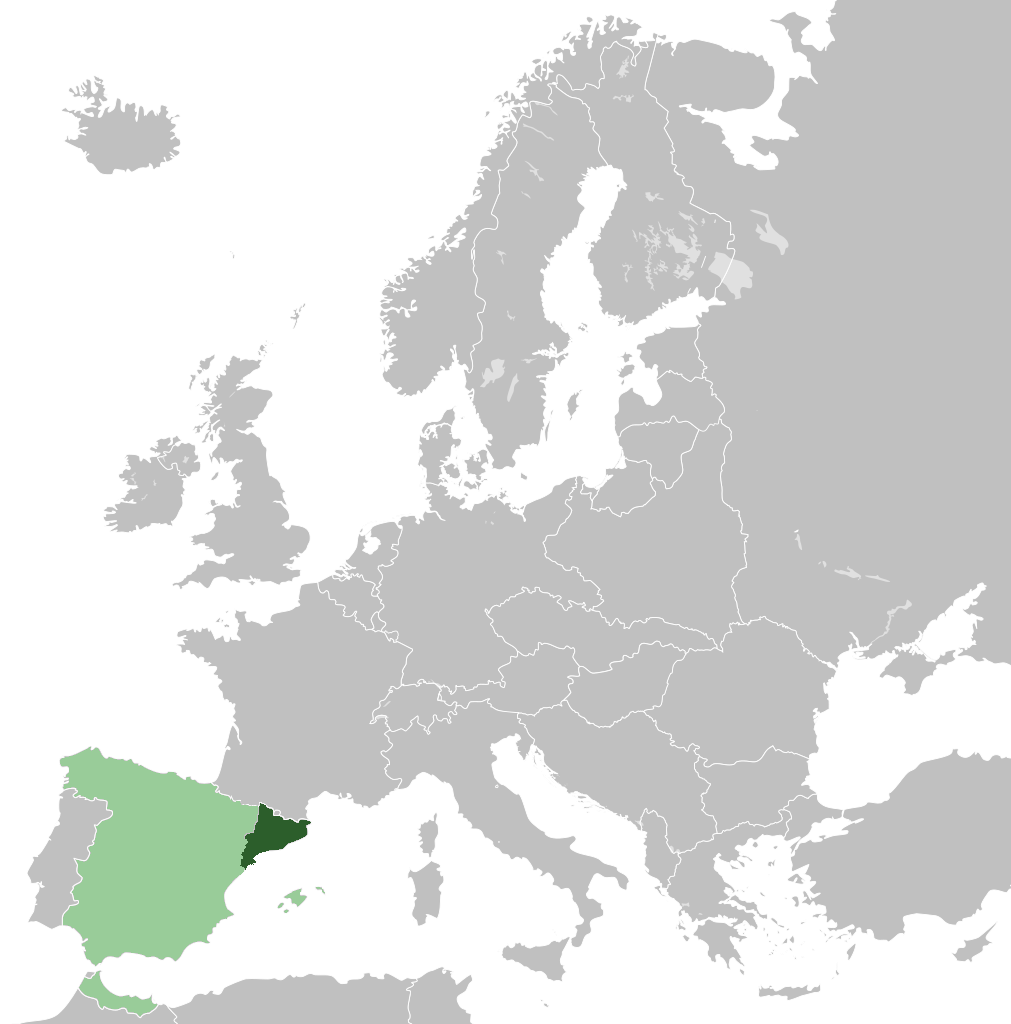
- Location of the Catalan State (dark green) within Spain (light green) within Europe
- Status: State within the Spanish Republic
- Capital: Barcelona
- Common languages: Catalan; Spanish
- Demonym: Catalan
- Government: Provisional republic
- President of the Generalitat
  - 1934: Lluís Companys
- Legislature: Parliament
- Historical era: Revolution of 1934
  - Proclaimed: 6 October 1934
  - Disestablished by the Spanish Army: 7 October 1934
- Currency: Spanish peseta (de facto)
Preceded by	Succeeded by
Second Spanish Republic; Generalitat of Catalonia	Second Spanish Republic
- Today part of: Spain ∟ Catalonia

The Catalan State (Catalan: Estat Català, IPA: [əsˈtat kətəˈla]) was a short-lived state that existed in Catalonia from 6 to 7 October 1934 during the Events of 6 October. The Catalan State was proclaimed by Lluís Companys, the left-wing President of the Generalitat of Catalonia, as a state "within the Spanish Federal Republic" in response to members of the right-wing CEDA party being included in the government of Second Spanish Republic. The Catalan State was immediately suppressed by the Spanish Army led by General Domènec Batet and Companys surrendered the next day.

== Background ==
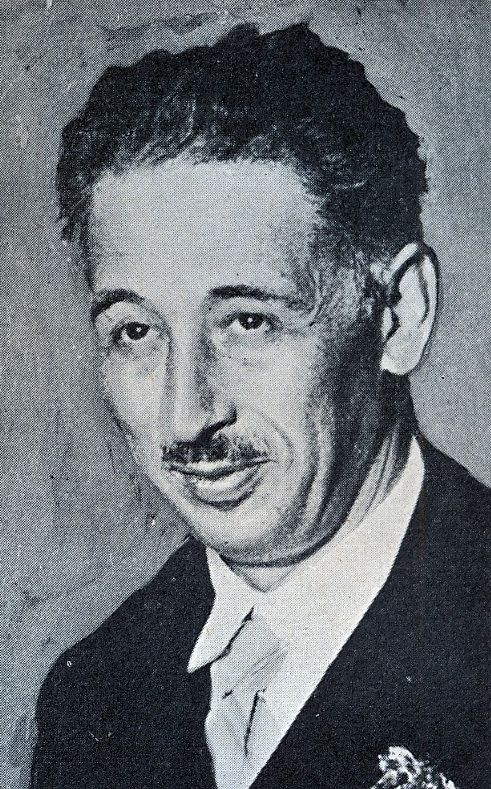
Lluís Companys i Jover

The Catalan State was part of the Revolution of 1934, a semi-insurrectional program of the Spanish left-wing against the new Spanish Republican government led by Alejandro Lerroux, which incorporated three ministers of CEDA, a right-wing political party that had won the 1933 general election. At the time, the Spanish left were anxious as Adolf Hitler had been appointed Chancellor of Germany a month earlier, and CEDA was considered close to fascism, therefore, they feared that it was the first step of the party to take power in Spain.

== Proclamation ==
In the afternoon of 6 October 1934, Lluís Companys as the President of the Generalitat of Catalonia proclaimed the creation of a Catalan State within the "Spanish Federal Republic". Companys appeared on the balcony of the Palau de la Generalitat de Catalunya accompanied by his advisers and proclaimed the Catalan State.

In this solemn hour, in the name of the people and the Parliament, the Government over which I preside assumes all the faculties of power in Catalonia, proclaims the Catalan State of the Spanish Federal Republic, and in establishing and fortifying relations with the leaders of the general protest against Fascism, invites them to establish in Catalonia the provisional Government of the Republic, which will find in our Catalan people the most generous impulse of fraternity in the common desire to erect a free and magnificent federal republic.

The attempt was quickly aborted by the Spanish government: General Domènec Batet, chief of the IV Organic Division of the Spanish Army stationed in Catalonia, crushed the uprising. Companys had telephoned Batet asking for his support before the proclamation, but he remained loyal to the Spanish government and gained some time demanding a written request. While Companys wrote the request, Batet prepared the local Army, Civil Guard, and Assault Guards to respond to the imminent proclamation. The Catalan State collapsed as Batet's men quickly gained control of the Palau de la Generalitat de Catalunya, cutting off Companys and his government from the Mossos d'Esquadra and militiamen under their control before they could receive orders.

== Aftermath ==
In the failed rebellion, 46 people died: 38 civilians and 8 soldiers. Companys and virtually all members of his government were arrested and imprisoned. More than 3,000 people were imprisoned, most of them in the Uruguay steamer, and placed under the jurisdiction of the councils of war. Manuel Azaña was also arrested, who happened to be in Barcelona to attend the funerals of the former minister of his cabinet, Jaime Carner. The soldiers who had taken part of the insurrection, the commander Enric Pérez Farràs and the captains Escofet and Ricart, were condemned to death. Their sentence was commuted to life imprisonment by Spanish President Niceto Alcalá-Zamora, in spite of the protests of both the CEDA and the Republican Liberal Democrat Party of Melquiades Álvarez, who demanded a strong hand. The President and the Government of the Generalitat were tried by the Constitutional Guarantees Tribunal and were sentenced for military rebellion to thirty years in prison, which was carried out by some in the Cartagena prison and others in the Puerto de Santa María. On 23 February 1935, the Mayor of Barcelona and the detained councilors were provisionally released. The government of Lerroux unleashed "a harsh repressive wave with the closure of political and trade union centers, the suppression of newspapers, the removal of municipalities and thousands of detainees, without having had a direct action on the facts", which showed "a punitive will often arbitrary and with vengeance components of class or ideological".

Catalonia's Statute of Autonomy was suspended indefinitely by a law passed on 14 December at the proposal of the Government (CEDA demanded the repeal of the Statute) and the Generalitat of Catalonia was replaced by a Council of the Generalitat appointed by the Government and presided by a Governor General of Catalonia (the first was Colonel Francisco Jiménez Arenas, who acted as "accidental president" of the Generalitat since 7 October, and who in January 1935 was replaced by Manuel Portela Valladares). In April 1935, when the state of war was lifted, Portela was replaced by the radical Joan Pich i Pon, and some of the powers of the Generalitat were returned to him, but not those of Public Order. The Catalan League participated in that government, "which confirmed its image as an accomplice of the enemies of autonomy and alienated middle class sectors from it, although at the same time, since the end of October, it denounced the central government for taking advantage of the situation created to suppress or reduce the autonomous faculties, maintaining that "a people should not be punished for the mistakes of their rulers". In the name of the Catalan League, the vice-president of the Catalan parliament, A. Martínez Domingo, challenged before the Guarantees Court the law of 2 January 1935, which emptied the Generalitat of its contents".

The controversial Crop Contracts Law was annulled by the Spanish government, and almost 3,000 eviction lawsuits of rabassaires and sharecroppers were processed. The left-wing Catalan nationalist newspapers were suspended.

Following the victory of the left-wing Popular Front in the 1936 general election, the Statute of Autonomy was reintroduced with Companys and his government pardoned and reinstated in their functions.
