= Francesc Macià =

Catalan politician (1859–1933)

The Right Honourable Francesc Macià i Llussà
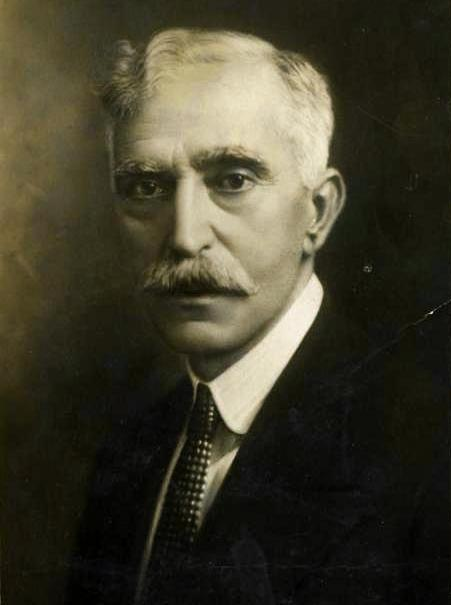
- Macià in 1925

122nd President of the Government of Catalonia
- In office 14 December 1932 – 25 December 1933
- President: Niceto Alcalá-Zamora
- Preceded by: Josep de Vilamala
- Succeeded by: Lluís Companys

3rd Acting President of the Catalan Republic
- In office 14 April 1931 – 17 April 1931
- Preceded by: Baldomer Lostau in 1873
- Succeeded by: Lluís Companys in 1934

Acting President of the Generalitat de Catalunya
- In office 17 April 1931 – 14 December 1932
- Preceded by: Himself as Acting President of the Catalan Republic
- Succeeded by: Himself as President of the Generalitat de Catalunya

Personal details
- Born: 21 September 1859 Vilanova i la Geltrú, Catalonia, Kingdom of Spain
- Died: 25 December 1933 (aged 74) Barcelona, Catalonia, Spanish Republic
- Party: Estat Català; Republican Left of Catalonia
- Spouse: Eugènia Lamarca i de Mier

Francesc Macià i Llussà (Catalan: [fɾənˈsɛzɡ məsiˈa j ʎuˈsa]; 21 September 1859 – 25 December 1933) was a Catalan politician who served as the 122nd president of the Generalitat of Catalonia, and formerly an officer in the Spanish Army.

Politically, Macià evolved from an initial regenerationism of Spain to the defense of the Catalan Republic and progressive politics, being appointed as the first president of the restored Generalitat and achieving the first successful establishment of self-government for Catalonia of modern history.

== Life ==
=== Early years ===
Francesc Macià i Llussà was born in Vilanova i la Geltrú, Catalonia, Spain. Shortly after the death of his father, when he was 16, he entered the Military Academy of Guadalajara to join the Corps of Engineers of the Spanish Army, specializing in bridges, railways and telegraphs. He requested to be transferred to Cuba but was sent several times to Barcelona, Madrid and Seville, rising from telegrapher to captain. As an officer in the Spanish army, he favored its modernization. He achieved the rank of lieutenant-colonel. In 1887 he was transferred to Lleida, where he met his wife, Eugènia Lamarca, daughter of Agapito Lamarca, with whom he had three children, Joan, Eugènia and Maria.

On 25 November 1905, some Spanish army officers, in retaliation to a joke in the satirical Catalan journal ¡Cu-Cut!, assaulted and destroyed the offices of the magazine, as well as the offices of the Catalanist journal La Veu de Catalunya. The Spanish Government responded by creating a Law of jurisdictions for the repression of crimes against the homeland and against the army, which caused various political groups to unite to form Solidaritat Catalana ('Catalan Solidarity'). Macià publicly condemned the military's action. As a result, his officials transferred him to Santoña, Cantabria.

He ran as a member of Catalan Solidarity in the election of 21 April 1907 for Barcelona and Les Borges Blanques districts, where his family came from. The resounding victory of this formation (41 of the 44 deputies of Catalonia) took him in Santoña. He was re-elected deputy in 1914, 1916, 1918, 1919, 1920 and 1923. From the Spanish Congress, he began to advocate for the regeneration of Spain, however, during his last years as a politician in Madrid, he moved from Catalan regionalist to left-wing independentist positions.

=== Independentist leader ===
In 1919 he founded the Nationalist Democratic Federation (Federació Democràtica Nacionalista), which proposed a federal or confederal solution for Spain, in which Catalonia would enjoy a high degree of self-government. In 1922, Macià founded the independentist party Estat Català.

In September 1923, right after the coup d'etat of Miguel Primo de Rivera, Macià took refuge in Perpignan. In 1926 he attempted an insurrection against the Spanish dictatorship of Primo de Rivera. This uprising, known as the plot of Prats de Molló, had the aim to achieve the independence of Catalonia, was based in Prats de Molló (Roussillon, southern France). Between 50 and 100 Italian mercenaries, mostly from the Garibaldi Legion that fought in the French Foreign Legion during World War I and exiled to France, were hired by Macià to help on the action. This attempt was aborted by the French Gendarmerie, which was able to abort the complot with the help of Ricciotti Garibaldi jr., a spy of Fascist Italy and grandson of Giuseppe Garibaldi. Macià was arrested and convicted to two months in jail and a fine of 100 francs. Despite the failure, Macià and his cause became very popular in Catalonia. He left France for Brussels in March 1927, where his notoriety increased while he remained in Belgium. He founded there, with other exiles, the Casal Català de Brussel·les. In April 1930 he returned to Spain after being pardoned; he was briefly exiled again but returned once more in February 1931.

=== Republic and Generalitat ===
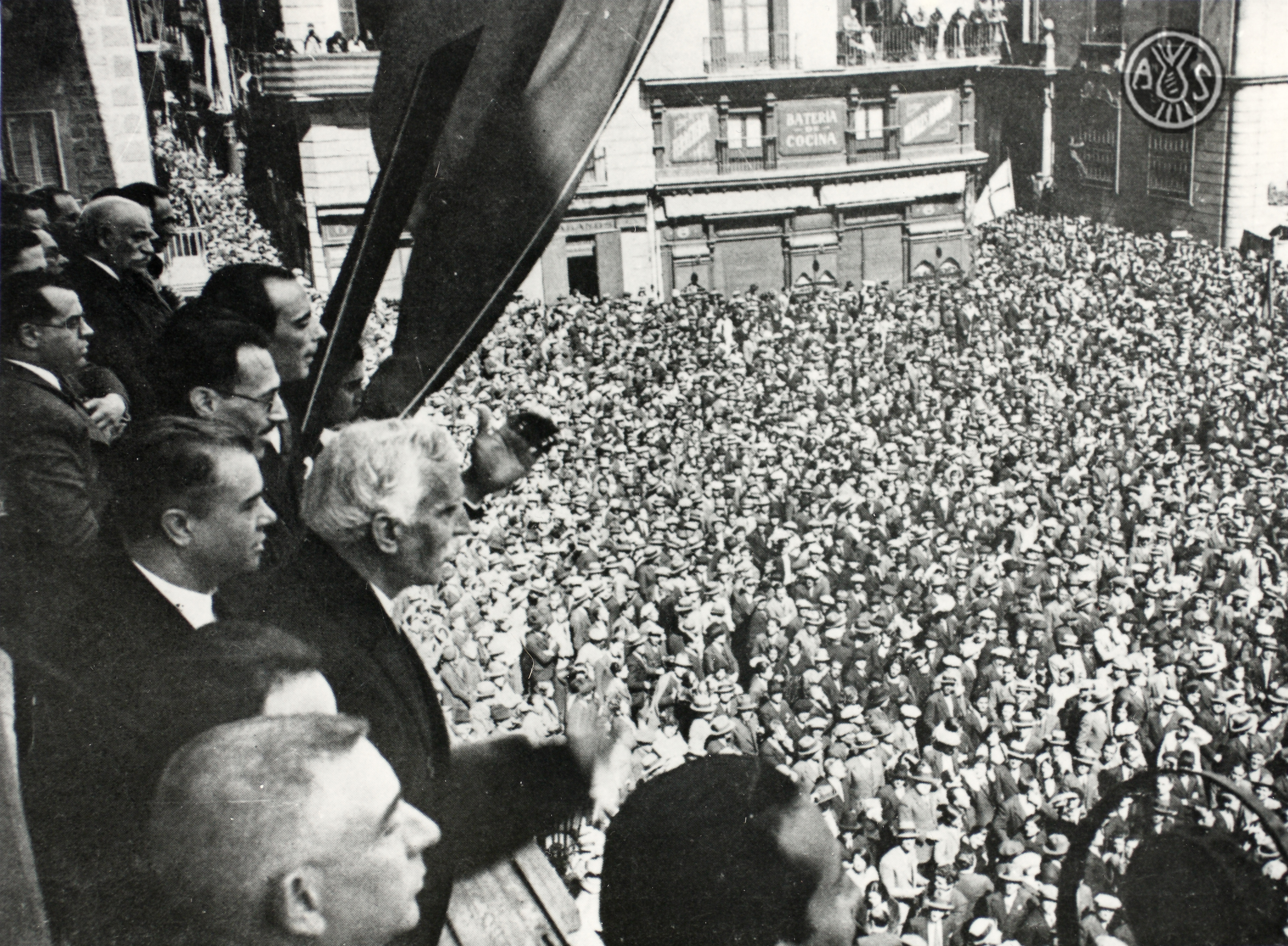
Francesc Macià proclaiming the Catalan Republic in Plaça de Sant Jaume, Barcelona, 14 April 1931

In March 1931 Estat Català joined the Catalan Republican Party of Lluís Companys and the L'Opinió Group of Joan Lluhí to found a new party, Republican Left of Catalonia (Esquerra Republicana de Catalunya, ERC), maintaining Estat Català a degree of internal autonomy. Francesc Macià became the leader figure of the new party.

On 14 April 1931, two days after the Spanish local elections that caused the exile of king Alfonso XIII of Spain and gave the local majority to the Republican Left of Catalonia, and a few hours before the proclamation of the Second Spanish Republic in Madrid, from the balcony of the Palau de la Generalitat (then the seat of the Provincial Deputation of Barcelona), Macià proclaimed the "Catalan Republic, expecting that the other peoples of Spain constitute themselves as republics, in order to establish the Iberian Confederation". Macià was appointed as acting president of Catalonia. Three days later, the government of the new Spanish Republic sent three ministers (Fernando de los Ríos, Lluís Nicolau d'Olwer and Marcel·lí Domingo) to Barcelona to negotiate with Macià and the Catalan provisional government. Macià reached an agreement with the ministers, in which the Catalan Republic was renamed Generalitat of Catalonia, becoming an autonomous government within the Spanish Republic. Macià remained as acting President of the Generalitat. The main task of the provisional Generalitat was to draft an statute of autonomy for Catalonia, approved by the Spanish Congress after many modifications and discussions on 9 September 1932.

After the first Catalan parliamentary election on 20 November 1932 when, after a landslide victory of ERC, he was officially appointed President of the Generalitat of Catalonia, maintaining the position until his death in December 1933.

=== Death ===
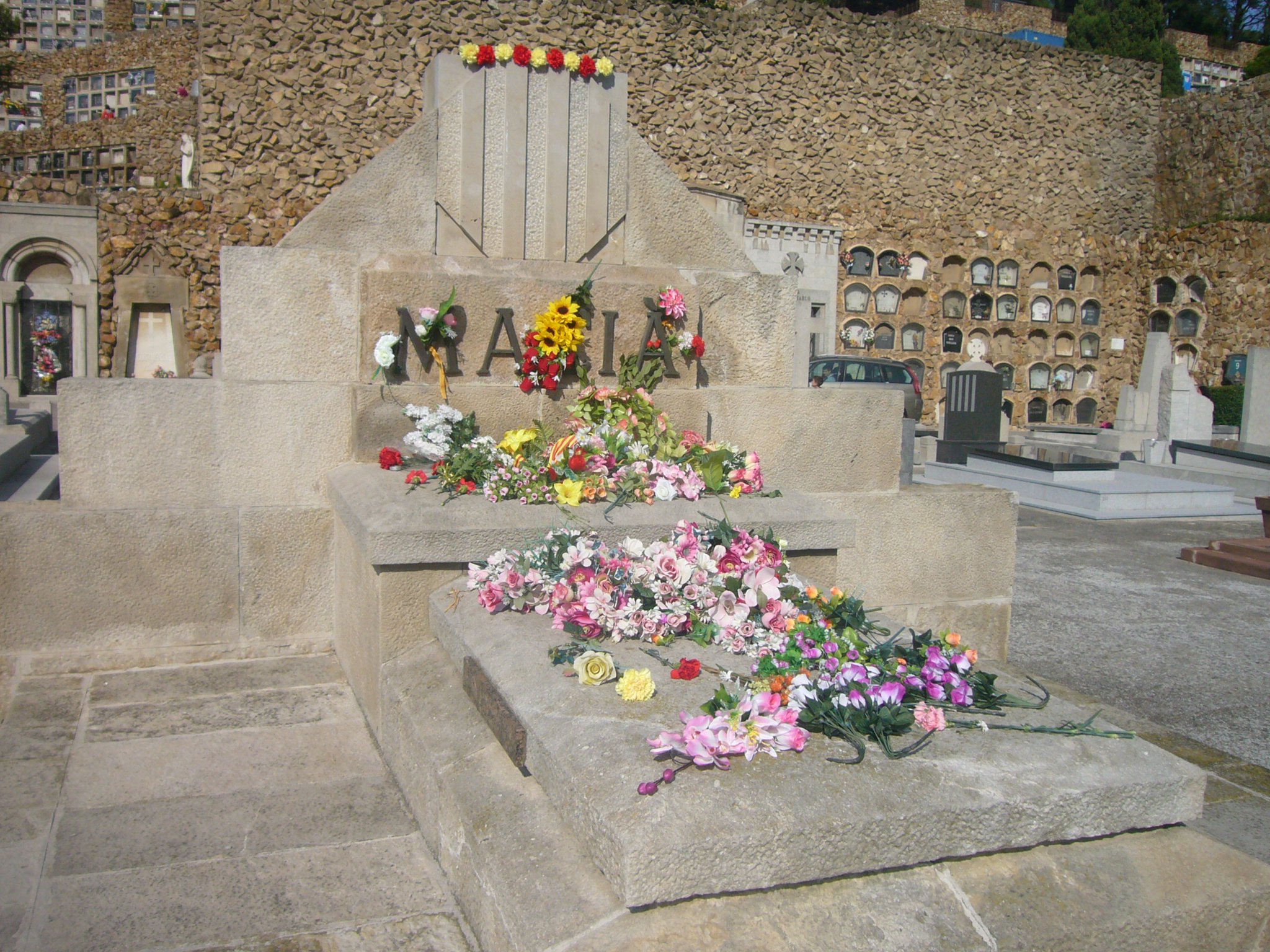
Tomb of Francesc Macià, located in Montjuïc Cemetery

Macià died due to appendicitis on 25 December 1933 in Barcelona. His funeral caused a massive demonstration of grief. His remains rest in the Plaça de la Fe, the Montjuïc Cemetery, in Barcelona's Montjuïc hill.

== Documentation ==
Part of his personal collection, which consists of documentation image about the president travels throughout Catalonia and family snapshots, is preserved in the National Archive of Catalonia. They are a repository of Mrs. Teresa Peyrí i Macià. The fund contains documents generated and received by Francesc Macià, personal and family documents, correspondence from the period before the Second Spanish Republic (until April 1931) and documentation produced primarily in terms of its political activity. The fund brings together documents relating to his conduct before being named president of the Government of Catalonia (1907-1931): as a Member of Parliament (speeches, proclamations, and conference reports) on Estat Català (organization, reports, proclamations, calls, publications, etc.), on Catalan Army (constitution, rules and organization, information mapping and geographic pathways) and on the corresponding period in the Directory of General Primo de Rivera. Finally, there is the collection of photographs, most made during his presidency.

Another part of Macià's personal archive consists of correspondence written to/by Joan Agell, documents of Centre Català in New York, diverse documentation and press clippings. It is in the Pavelló de la República CRAI Library at the University of Barcelona.

== See also ==
- Plaça de Francesc Macià, Barcelona

Political offices
Preceded by Himself, as Acting President of the Government of Catalonia, but in 1716, Josep de Vilamala	Presidents of the Government of Catalonia; 1932–1933	Succeeded by Lluís Companys
Preceded by Himself, as Acting President of the Catalan Republic	Acting Presidents of the Government of Catalonia; 1931–1932	Succeeded by Himself, as Presidents of the Government of Catalonia
Preceded by Baldomer Lostau, in 1873	Acting President of the Catalan Republic; 1931	Succeeded by Himself, as Acting Presidents of the Government of Catalonia, but Lluís Companys, as Acting President of the Catalan Republic, in 1934
Party political offices
Preceded by New title	President of Estat Català; 1922–1933	Succeeded by Josep Dencàs i Puigdollers
Preceded by New title	President of ERC; 1931–1933	Succeeded by Lluís Companys
