= Lluís Nicolau d'Olwer =

Catalan politician, historian and writer

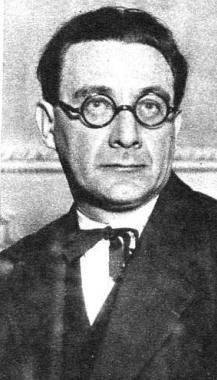

Minister of the Economy
- In office 14 April 1931 – 16 December 1931

Deputy for Barcelona
- In office 11 July 1931 – 9 October 1933

Governor of the Bank of Spain
- In office March 1936 – August 1938
- Preceded by: Alfredo de Zavala y Lafora
- Succeeded by: Antonio Goicoechea

Deputy for Barcelona
- In office 28 February 1936 – 2 February 1939

Personal details
- Born: 20 January 1888 Barcelona, Spain
- Died: 24 December 1961 (aged 73) Mexico City, Mexico
- Occupation: Writer, politician

Lluís Nicolau d'Olwer (20 January 1888 in Barcelona – 24 December 1961 in Mexico City) was a Catalan politician, historian and writer. He served as the Minister of Economics in the provisional government of the Second Spanish Republic from April to December 1931 and later headed the Bank of Spain (1936–38).

== Biography ==
A son of the notary Joaquín Nicolau and Anna d'Olwer (who was of Irish ancestry), he studied philosophy and literature in Barcelona before completing a doctorate in Madrid. In 1917, he published the first study of Catalan literature written in the Catalan language. In 1918, he became a member of the philology department of the Institute of Catalan Studies and a representative of the Regionalist League in the municipality of Barcelona.

As a member of the Cultural Committee, he initiated modern teaching policies and in 1922 was a co-founder of the Acció Catalana. Between 1926 and 1931, he suffered persecution from the dictatorship of Primo de Rivera. In 1933, he was deputy chairman of the London Economic Conference and governor of the Bank of Spain. During the Spanish Civil War he sought exile in France. When the Germans occupied France during the Second World War, he was arrested by the Gestapo but managed to escape. He went to Mexico where he served as a minister without portfolio in the Republican government-in-exile led by José Giral. After the war, he continued to live in Mexico where he was appointed a member of the College of Mexico. He continued to publish works on European and Latin American history until his death.

== Principal works ==
- "Felix, bisbe d’Urgell (segle VIII)", Revista de bibliografía catalana 6 (1906): 88–144
- "Gerbert (Silvestre II) y la cultura catalana del sigle X", Estudis universitaris catalans 4 (1910): 332–58
- El teatro de Menandro. Estudio histórico-literario y traducción de los nuevos fragmentos (1911; doctoral thesis)
- "L'escola poética de Ripoll en les segles X-XIII", Anuari de l’Institut d’Estudis Catalans 6 (1915–20): 3–84
- Literatura catalana. Perspectiva general (1917)
- Comentaris, 1915-1917 (1920)
- L'expansió de Catalunya en la Mediterrània oriental (1926, revised 2nd edn. 1954, 3rd edn. 1974)
- Resum de literatura catalana (1927)
- El pont de la mar blava. Notes de viatge per Tunísia, Sicília i Malta (1928)
- Paisatges de la nostra història. Assaigs i notes de literatura catalana (1929)
- La lliçó de la dictadura (1931)
- (as editor) Miscel·lània Verdaguer. Homenatge al poeta nacional de Catalunya amb motiu del centenari del seu naixement (1946)
- Fray Bernardino de Sahagún, 1499-1590 (1952; English tr. Mauricio J. Mixco, 1987)
- La duquessa d’Atenes i els “documents misteriosos” (1958)
- Jocs florals de la llengua catalana. Any XCIX de la seva restauració (1958)
- Caliu. Records de mestres i amics (1958; censored edn. 1973)
- Cronistas de las culturas precolombinas. Antología (1963)
- Pere Abelard. Un humanista del segle XII, ed. Josep Batalla (2017; unfinished work begun in 1945)
- Introducció a la història literària de Catalunya, ed. August Rafanell and Joan Ferrer (2022; collection of journal articles from 1914–15)
