= Statute of Autonomy of Catalonia of 1932 =

Statute of Autonomy of Catalonia
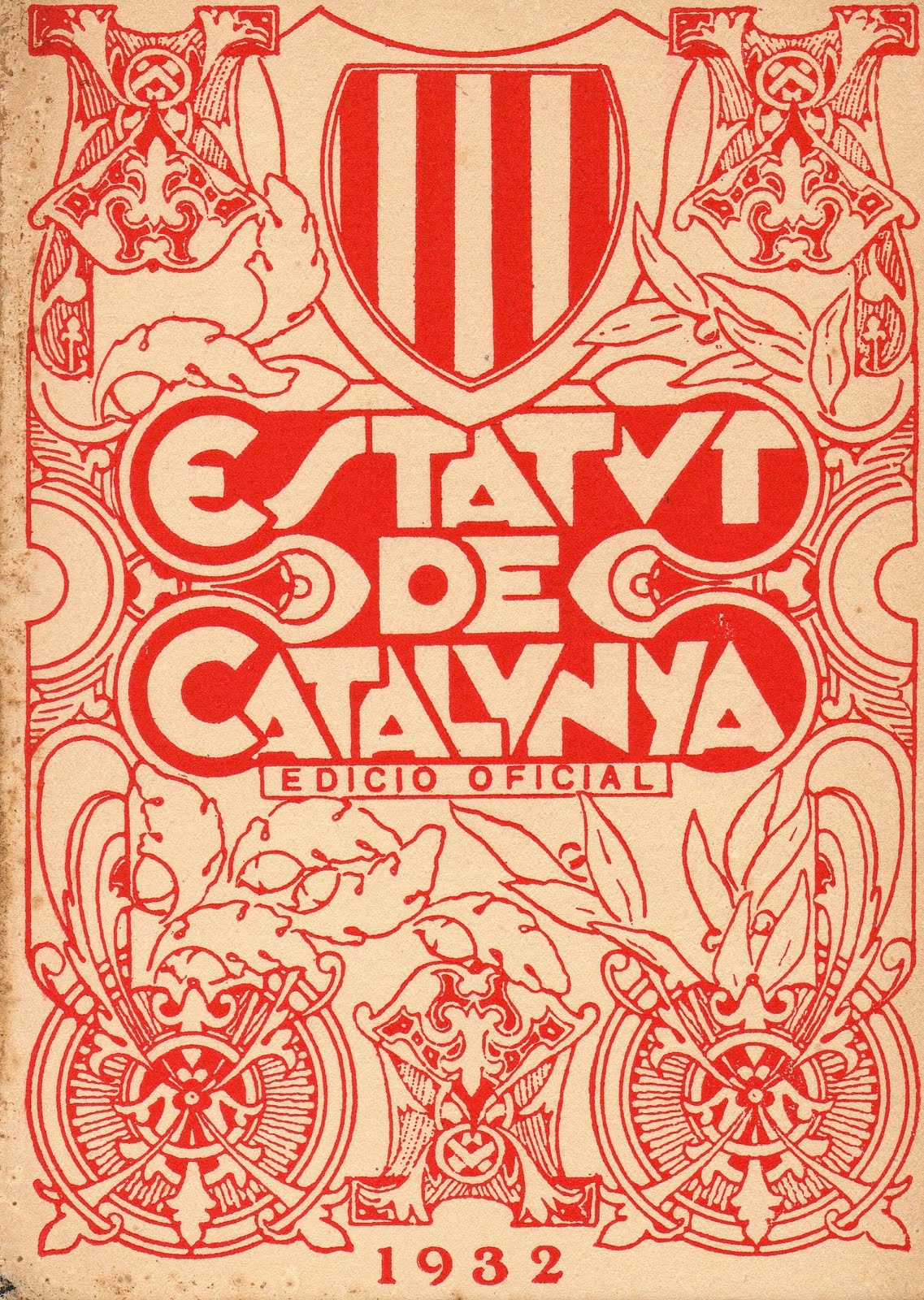
- Front cover of the first Statute of Autonomy of Catalonia, 1932

Overview
- Original title: (in Catalan) Estatut d'Autonomia de Catalunya de 1932
- Jurisdiction: Catalonia
- Ratified: 9 September 1932
- System: Autonomous parliamentary system under unitary constitutional republic

Government structure
- Branches: 3
- Chambers: Unicameral (Parliament of Catalonia)
- Executive: Executive council responsible to the Parliament; President of the Generalitat as head of government
- Judiciary: Tribunal de Cassació
- Authors: Jaume Carner, Antoni Xirau, Martí Esteve, Rafael Campalans, Pere Coromines

The Statute of Autonomy of Catalonia of 1932, also called the Statute of Núria, was the first implemented statute of autonomy for Catalonia, officially providing self-government to Catalonia for the first time in more than 200 years. The Statute was promoted by the then acting President of the Generalitat, Francesc Macià, and approved in a referendum by 99% of Catalan voters. The draft Statute was completed on 20 June 1931 in Núria (Ripollès, Girona) and finally approved by the Spanish Parliament on 9 September 1932. It was implemented until the occupation of Catalonia by the Nationalist Army during the last stages of the Spanish Civil War, in 1939.

== Historical background ==
The local elections of 12 April 1931 represented good results for leftist and republican parties and the establishment of the Spanish Republic. In Catalonia, the newly formed party Republican Left of Catalonia (Catalan: Esquerra Republicana de Catalunya, ERC), won a landslide victory. This fact led its leader, Francesc Macià, to proclaim the Catalan Republic within the Federation of Iberian Republics few hours before the proclamation of the Spanish Republic and the formation of the Provisional Government of the Catalan Republic, chaired by himself.

Within three days of government, Macià received the visit of the Spanish ministers Fernando de los Ríos, Marcelino Domingo and Lluís Nicolau d'Olwer. After lengthy negotiations, the President accepted some guidelines in exchange for a statute of autonomy for Catalonia. As part of the compromise, the Catalan Republic was renamed Generalitat of Catalonia (Catalan: Generalitat de Catalunya), led by Macià as acting president.

== Procedures ==
On 28 April 1931 the Spanish Council of Ministers passed a decree establishing the provisional composition of the Generalitat: the Government or Council, composed by the President and the ministers, and the Provisional Deputation of the Generalitat (Catalan: Diputació Provisional de la Generalitat). The Provisional Deputation, made up of representatives of Catalan municipalities, and the Government appointed a commission in charge of the redaction of the draft of the statute of autonomy. It was chaired by Jaume Carner and included Antoni Xirau, from the Republican Left of Catalonia; Rafael Campalans, from the Socialist Union of Catalonia; Martí Esteve, from Catalan Action, and Pere Coromines, an independent.

The preliminary draft was completed at the Hotel of the Vall de Núria on 20 June 1931.

In the referendum on the draft Statute, held on 2 August 1931, involved around 75% of the electorate, and obtained 99% of votes in favor. In addition, it was supported by more than 400,000 signatures of Catalan women (then without the right to vote). Thus, the first draft of the autonomous status granted to a Spanish region was approved overwhelmingly popular. Following a failed coup of General Sanjurjo, the Spanish Cortes Generales approved the Catalan Statute on 9 September 1932.

== Statute ==
The drafted Statute included 52 articles and a preambule. One of the main points is the definition of Catalonia as an autonomous state within the Spanish Republic; in addition, the preambule also offered the possibility of a future self-determination for the Catalan people. The draft established Catalan as the official language of Catalonia. This claims were not well accepted by the rest of Spain, so the clause was amended.

In addition, the drafted Statute gave to the Generalitat of Catalonia an extensive list of powers hitherto unthinkable, as were powers in the field of education, health, public order, and the creation of a Catalan parliament and a high court of justice. The parliamentary procedures in the Spanish Parliament cut the initial project, calling it overly ambitious and pretentious.

The text approved by the Spanish Parliament on 9 September 1932, considerably amended, consisted in 18 articles, defining Catalonia as an autonomous region of the Spanish State, politically organized into the Generalitat of Catalonia. Catalan became an official language in Catalonia, alongside Spanish.

== Implementation ==
On 20 November 1932 the first election to the Parliament of Catalonia was held. The Republican Left of Catalonia won a large majority of seats, and Francesc Macià was confirmed as President of the Generalitat. Lluís Companys was elected president of the Parliament.

The Statute of Núria was relatively short-lived. The Parliament of Catalonia, however, saw an important legislative activity in order to deploy and consolidate the recently acquired self-government, as it was the case of the Statute of Internal Regime, passed on 25 May 1933. It was in force from their approval until after the victory of the CEDA in the general elections of 1933, and subsequent issues that led to the events of October the 6th, when it was immediately suspended; later, when the Popular Front won the elections in February 1936, the Statute is re-established until the end of the Spanish Civil War, when it was finally repealed. In fact, General Francisco Franco already repealed the Statute in the area of Catalonia that was dominated territorially on 5 April 1938.
