= Catalan Action =

Catalanist political movement

Catalan Action Acció Catalana
- President: Jaume Bofill
- Founded: 1922
- Dissolved: 1931
- Headquarters: Barcelona
- Ideology: Republicanism; Catalan nationalism Social liberalism
- Political position: Centre-left
- Colours: Red, Yellow

Catalan Action (Catalan: Acció Catalana, AC) was a centre-left Catalanist political movement active in Catalonia during the early 20th century.

== History ==
AC was created in 1922 around the Catalan National Conference, which brought together elements of the Joventut Nacionalista, the Regionalist League, former members of the Federal Unió Republicana Nacionalista, and independent youth intellectuals. Dissatisfied with the performance of Lliga, rated low by the new nationalist party, the first central committee was formed by Jaume Bofill i Mates, President, Lluis Nicolau d'Olwer, Antoni Rovira i Virgili, Carlos Jordán, Ramon d'Abadal i Vinyals and Leandre Cervera. The daily Advertising, acquired by the new party and fully Catalanised (it was renamed the Publicitat), became his means of expression.

The party would become the largest in Catalonia following the June 1923 provincial elections, signalling a leftward shift in Catalan nationalism which was previously dominated by the conservative Regionalist League. A pact with Basque and Galician nationalists was signed this summer called the Triple Alliance. The party's more left-wing factions, led by Antoni Rovira i Virgili, would leave in 1927 to create Acció Republicana de Catalunya.

After the dictatorship of Primo de Rivera, the party was a signatory to the Pact of San Sebastián (1930), represented by Manuel Carrasco Formiguera. Lluís Nicolau d'Olwer, appointed to the Provisional Government of the Republic, headed into hiding for Niceto Alcalá-Zamora. In March 1931, the party merged with Acció Republicana de Catalunya and became Accio Catalana Republicana.
