= Constituent Assembly of Catalan Separatism =

The Catalan pro-independence estelada (above) and the Cuban flag (below) presided over the Assembly

The Constituent Assembly of Catalan Separatism was a meeting of the Catalan independence movement that was held in Havana (Cuba) between September 30 and October 2, 1928, and was chaired by Francesc Macià, the leader of Estat Català, who after the failure of the Prats de Molló plot that sought to overthrow the Dictatorship of Primo de Rivera, which had governed Spain since September 1923, and proclaim the Independent Catalan Republic, had begun a propaganda tour of the "cause of Catalonia" throughout Latin America. The Assembly approved the Provisional Constitution of the Catalan Republic, of which 10,000 copies were published, and founded the Partit Separatista Revolucionari Català.

== History ==
Despite its failure, the Prats de Molló plot in November 1926 had a wide international echo which, according to historian Eduardo González Calleja, took on "an unexpected epic dimension" and gave "origin to the persistent myth of the 'Avi [Macià], precisely at the time of the lowest popularity of the Dictatorship and its accomplices in Catalonia". From then on, Macià developed a feverish propaganda activity for the "Catalan cause". In December 1927, he began a trip through Latin America, which ended in Cuba. In the company of Ventura Gassol, he first visited the Catalan centers of Uruguay, where he was very well received, to later go to Argentina, touring the entire country —he was in Buenos Aires, La Plata, Rosario, Córdoba, and Mendoza—. He did not manage to go to Chile because the Chilean dictator Colonel Ibáñez denied him entry to the country. Finally, he traveled to Cuba.

In Havana, the self-styled Constituent Assembly of Catalan Separatism was held between September 30 and October 2, 1928, a political convention of Catalan independence that took the Guáimaro Convention as a model, from which the first Constitution of Cuba emerged. The idea came from Josep Conangla i Fontanals who proposed it to Macià in September 1927, and he supported it. The organization was carried out by the Catalan Separatist Club number 1 in Havana through a commission made up of Conangla, Claudi Mimó, Josep Murillo and Josep Carner i Ribalta.

The Assembly was chaired by Macià, with Claudi Mimó as honorary president; Josep Murillo and Josep López Franc as Vice Presidents; Joaquim Muntal and Ventura Gassol as assistants; Conangla and Josep Carner Ribalta as speakers; Josep Pineda as secretary; and Lluís Font and Lleonard Ribot as deputy secretaries. 25 accredited delegates participated and the Provisional Constitution of the Catalan Republic and the creation of the Partit Separatista Revolucionari Català were approved.

In the Assembly, it was also decided that the method of struggle to achieve the independence of Catalonia would continue to be the armed uprising of the Catalans, although after the failure of the January 1929 coup led by José Sánchez Guerra, Macià decided to abandon the project of a new invasion and opted to organize an insurrection in the interior of Catalonia, linked to the various anti-dictatorial and anti-monarchist conspiracies that were being hatched in Spain at the time.
