= Plot of Prats de Molló =

Planned Catalan military action

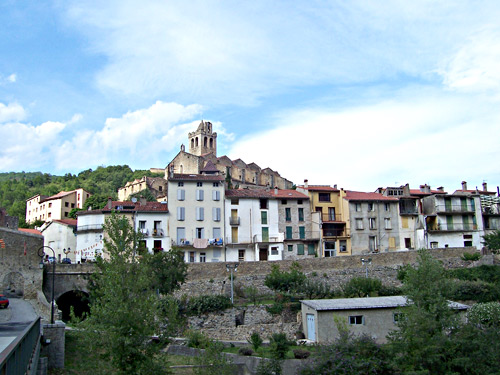
- Current view of the town of Prats de Molló i la Presta
Date	November 4, 1926
Location	Prats-de-Mollo-la-Preste, Vallespir, Northern Catalonia (France)
Result	Aborted operation and arrest of the leaders

Belligerents
Estat Català; Bandera Negra; Italian anti-fascist volunteers	Kingdom of Spain; French Republic

Commanders and leaders
Francesc Macià; Josep Carner i Ribalta; Ventura Gassol; Ricciotti Garibaldi Jr (façade)	Miguel Primo de Rivera; Ricciotti Garibaldi Jr (actual)

Units involved
About 150 volunteers	

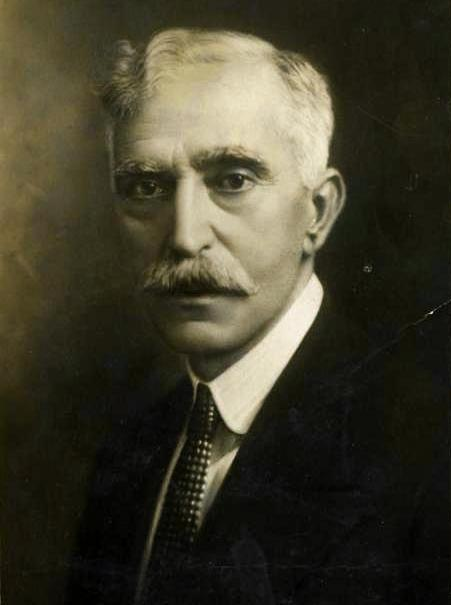
Francesc Macià, who would later become president of the Generalitat de Catalunya (1932-1933), was the leader of the failed invasion of Catalonia across the French border

The plot of Prats de Molló, better known in Catalan historiography as the events of Prats de Molló, (fets de Prats de Molló) (by the place name in Catalan of the town of French Roussillon Prats-de-Mollo-la-Preste), was an attempted military liberation of Catalonia, then under the Spanish dictatorship of Primo de Rivera, carried out from France to achieve its independence planned by Francesc Macià and the leadership of the Estat Català party, discovered and aborted in 1926. The plan consisted of the penetration of two columns (one from Saint-Laurent-de-Cerdans, the other from Coll d'Ares), which were to occupy Olot and proclaim the Catalan Republic.

== Preparations ==
Primo de Rivera's coup d'état and the anti-Catalanist policy that he immediately adopted reaffirmed Estat Català's commitment to the insurrectionary path. Francesc Macià, the then 64-year-old Estat Català leader, made this clear on October 7, 1923, shortly before he fled to French Catalonia when he explained that his party's main goal was to form a grand coalition with labor organizations and the Catalan republican parties, and with the Basque and Galician radical nationalists, to carry out a subversive movement that would put an end to the dictatorship. With this objective the first escamots were formed, it was founded in Paris —where Macià was forced to move from Perpignan by order of the French police, after some incidents during the celebration of Jocs Florals in Toulouse— a Catalan Separatist Committee, which would serve as the insurrection's headquarters, and began to raise funds for the purchase of war material. At the international level, Macià contacted various movements of European stateless nations and with Philippine nationalists to form a League of Oppressed Nations, constituted in September 1924, which would act as a propaganda center and as a pressure group before the League of Nations. Macià's initial plan was to organize a border raid that would allow him to occupy enough territory to draw the world's attention and demand a solution to the "Catalan case." In November 1924 Macià writes (in Catalan):

Despite all these difficulties, however, we are willing to continue forward, because this Catalonia demands it, not made up of politicians or manufacturers or material goods that they fear losing, but rather this Catalonia of the spirit that we feel pushes us and shouts at us. He asks us to dignify it, as we have given him our word.

In January 1925, Macià met in Paris with representatives of the CNT and with the radical Basque nationalists aberrianos (who then controlled the PNV) to organize a simultaneous uprising in Catalonia and the Basque Country, which would be supported by mobilizations in other Spanish regions that they would have the support of some military. From that meeting came the so-called Pact of the Free Alliance by which a General Revolutionary Committee, or Action Committee, was created, which would be the one to lead the uprising. To finance the operation, a loan was issued, called the Pau Claris loan, worth nearly nine million pesetas, and between April and August members of the escamots established several weapons depots near the Franco-Spanish border. Meanwhile, the French police kept Macià under strict surveillance, for leading the organization of a plot prepared against the Spanish Government, according to a report from the French Ministry of the Interior.

In June clandestine groups from Estat Català and Acció Catalana organized the so-called Garraf plot, a failed attack against the king and queen of Spain off the coast of Garraf, promoted from abroad by Daniel Cardona, a leader of Estat Català who is increasingly critical of Macià's strategy and that in November he would leave the party.

In October 1925, after incorporating the communists into the Free Alliance Pact, Macià traveled to Moscow —accompanied by the secretary of the PCE José Bullejos— to obtain the support of the Soviet government and the Comintern. Andreu Nin, who was then working for the Komitern, acted as his interpreter and managed to meet with Bukharin and Zinoviev, who promised him economic and military aid, but it never came. According to Josep Carner i Ribalta, who had also accompanied Macià to Moscow, «a few days after our return to Paris, we learned that Zinoviev and his friends had fallen into disgrace and had been dispossessed of all power by Stalin. It may be that for this reason, the promised representative of the Third International in Paris never arrived, nor, of course, the promised money»

According to Eduardo González Calleja, it was 400,000 pesetas. This historian affirms, on the other hand, that when Macià returned to Paris, both the CNT and the Basque nationalists were reticent about the "Moscow pact". Macià finally broke with the communists in the spring of 1926, because "we have realized that they were people who, having promised their help, always broke their word, not contributing what they promised and that what they were going to do was take advantage of our name and our organizations to present ourselves with our prestige and carry out their campaigns”, as Macià wrote.

== Developing ==
Catalan independence flag that was going to be hoisted as soon as a significant part of the territory was occupied and the Catalan Republic was proclaimed.

After the failed coup attempt in June 1926, known as "La Sanjuanada", Maciá decided to carry out his plan to invade Catalonia across the French border. “I, for my part, believe that the plot has not ended here, and I have firmly decided, regardless of what they can do and regardless of what our other allies can do, to carry out something ourselves, that even if freedom is not guaranteed... at least it will make us stay in a decent place”, writes Macià.

Macià's plan was for the escamots to penetrate through Prats de Molló, in French Catalonia, and after taking Olot they would go to Barcelona, where a general strike would be declared, which would have the collaboration of part of the garrison, and where the Catalan Republic would be proclaimed. It was hoped that this proclamation would provoke uprisings in other Spanish regions.

Around the same time, Macià came into contact in Paris with a group of Italian exiles, including Ricciotti Garibaldi Jr, grandson of the hero of Italian unification, who was not really an anti-fascist fighter but a double agent at the service of the political police. of Mussolini. Thanks to this Primo de Rivera learned of the planned invasion. Many of these Italian exiles—between 50 and 100—who participated in the operation had fought in the Garibaldine Legion during World War I. With his intervention Macià was looking for the military experience that his escamots lacked, and that "Macià knew perfectly well that they were complex and contradictory characters. There was a minority of politicized, idealistic volunteers, and a majority of adventurers, marginal characters, declassed and even criminals, residents for years in France... [and who] lived in the cafes and taverns of Paris". The one who recruited them was Arturo Rizzoli, a veteran of the Great War, who worked as a dishwasher in a Paris restaurant where he met Joan Nicolau, a prominent member of Estat Català, who also worked in the establishment.

The attack plan consisted of creating two armed columns that, at dawn, would cross the Spanish-French border and enter through mountain paths to the outskirts of Olot, where several more groups would join them. Once reunited, the strategy consisted of falling by surprise on the capital of the region of La Garrotxa, Olot, and attacking the Civil Guard and Carabineros barracks. At this time, they would take advantage of the action to spread the news of the proclamation of the Catalan Republic through a station that they themselves would transport. It was expected that, upon receiving the news of the operation, the Catalan people would rise up. Later, they would go to Les Guilleries where the base camp would be set up and operations would continue.

The idea seems to have come from Macià himself, who had been a colonel in the Spanish Army, and the decision to carry it out was made by the direction of Estat Català, exiled in France and spread over three different places: in Bois-Colombes (Hauts de-Seine ) was Ventura Gassol, Josep Bordas de Cuesta, Josep Carner, Ernest Dalmau, Josep Rovira, Josep Marlès and Martí Vilanova; in Toulouse Roc Boronat and Juli Figueres, and in Perpignan Artur Coromines and Josep Esparç. Macià appointed Josep Bordas de Cuesta as lieutenants for political matters, Josep Carner and Ventura Gassol for propaganda, Josep Rovira, Martí Vilanova, the Morella brothers, Joaquim Carrió, Roc Boronat and Ferran Arqués for military matters. Inside, Jaume Aiguader and Amadeu Bernadó were in charge of recruiting volunteers.

According to an unreferenced version, Macià was in favor of not carrying out any action until between 400 and 500 volunteers had been recruited and prepared, but the rivalries between the party's leaders (such as Daniel Cardona) to obtain the support of the American Catalans and the fact that the youngest and most radical sectors (grouped in the Bandera Negra clandestine organization) carried out the failed Garraf plot pushed Macià to approve the operation sooner than expected.

On October 30, Macià gave the mobilization order for those involved in the operation -a glorious adventure, according to Macià- to present themselves, some in Prats de Molló and others in Sant Llorenç de Cerdans, between that date and November 1, while Macià himself, together with Ventura Gassol, established their headquarters in a country house near Prats de Molló. The mobilization plan was that a group of men dressed as hikers would leave Paris and other French cities—Bordeaux, Toulouse, Lyon, Perpignan—as members of a mountain group headed for Canigó. They would carry hidden weapons, field telephones, medical supplies, printed propaganda, and a estelada flag that would be hoisted on the bell tower of the first town to be occupied.

The projected invasion was a complete failure because the French police were on notice, apparently due to a leak from Garibaldi's group, and he did not have much difficulty in arresting most of the participants in the invasion near the Spanish border (there were 111 detainees). Macià was arrested on the 4th in the country house he was occupying. Meanwhile in Barcelona the Spanish police, who were also aware of the operation, arrested those involved in the plot from the interior of Catalonia.

== The trial ==
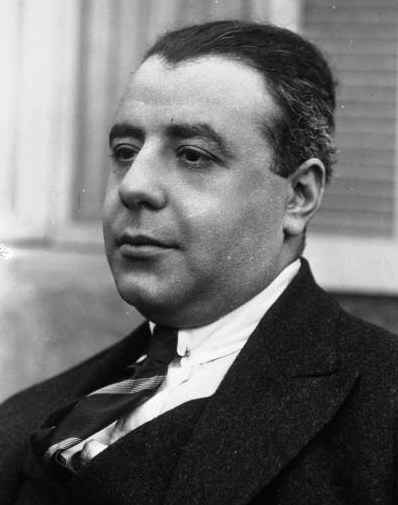
Henry Torrès, Macia's defense attorney

Macià was taken to Perpignan, where the rest of the detainees were also taken, being housed in the barracks of the Senegalese rifle regiment. Within a few days, most of those arrested are expelled from France, while about twenty, considered the masterminds of the operation, are transferred to Paris to stand trial. The news of the complot des catalans, as the French press calls it, and the subsequent trial occupies the pages of the newspapers of Europe and America, which is a strong support for the "Catalan cause". Macià, aged 67, becomes a popular character in France, and is sometimes presented as an idealistic Don Quixote.

Those implicated brought to trial in Paris were 18, 16 Catalans (Macià himself, Josep Bordas, Roc Boronat, Josep Carner Ribalta, Ernest Dalmau, Josep Esparch, Ventura Gassol, Joan Moragues, Josep Morella, Pere Morella, Luis Morella, Josep Rovira, Martí Vilanova, Ramon Fabregat, Artur Coromines, Juli Figueras) and 2 Italians (Arturo Rizzoli and Ricciotti Garibaldi, Jr).

In a preliminary interrogation, Francesc Macià, on behalf of all the accused, affirmed that the conspirators represented "the survival of the rebellious spirit of oppressed Catalonia", and a few days later in an interview for the Paris newspaper Le Petit Journal, he justified the attempt of invasion: «Catalonia separated from Spain will not only be happier in the spiritual sense, but also in the economic sense». During the investigation, Macià confessed, according to the trial records, "having prepared and organized an armed expedition to seize power and proclaim the Independent Catalan Republic."

The trial began on January 21, 1927 and during the same Macià took the opportunity to read a long statement on behalf of all the accused in which he defended the "cause of Catalonia":

Mr. President... we are citizens of a people that has been free and wants to be free again. [...] That is why, by marching towards Catalonia to provoke there the uprising that would have set us free, and taking great care to avoid any diplomatic conflict for France, we did not believe that we were committing any crime.[...] Indeed, we were marching to fight a historical enemy of France: Spain. And to liberate a friendly town of your country: Catalonia. [...] We want an independent Catalan republic that is for you a Pyrenean Belgium - a republic that we were going to conquer by violence, this being the only means by which Spain can come to its senses, which has never granted any right to no people he has oppressed, if not by arms...—.

We want to enter as an independent state in the concert of free peoples, since there will be no international peace while there are slave nations. [...] We want to free our Catalan homeland from the Spanish domination that has weighed on it since 1714. [...] We want to free our beloved homeland from the scourge of this military dictatorship, an authentic representation of the official Spain that considers Catalonia as a conquered country and as the last of its colonies to be exploited. [...] We want to expel from our unfortunate country this group of ignorant and despotic generals who, at the service of the Spanish monarchy, have profaned our traditions and festivals, have banned the Catalan flag, have outlawed our language, have closed our schools, have destroyed the Prat de la Riba, the Mancomunitat, and all its cultural institutions, have destroyed the Culture Commission of the Barcelona City Council, they have deported, imprisoned and tortured so many Catalans for the sole crime of having wanted to listen to the voice of their dignity as men. [...]

With our freedom, we want the freedom of all the other peoples of Spain who, just like us, suffer from the slavery of official Spain. [...] Once free, all the peoples of Spain would accept all fraternal ties, by free agreement, without in any way affecting our national sovereignty. What we do not want and cannot accept, as we said, are these same ties imposed by force

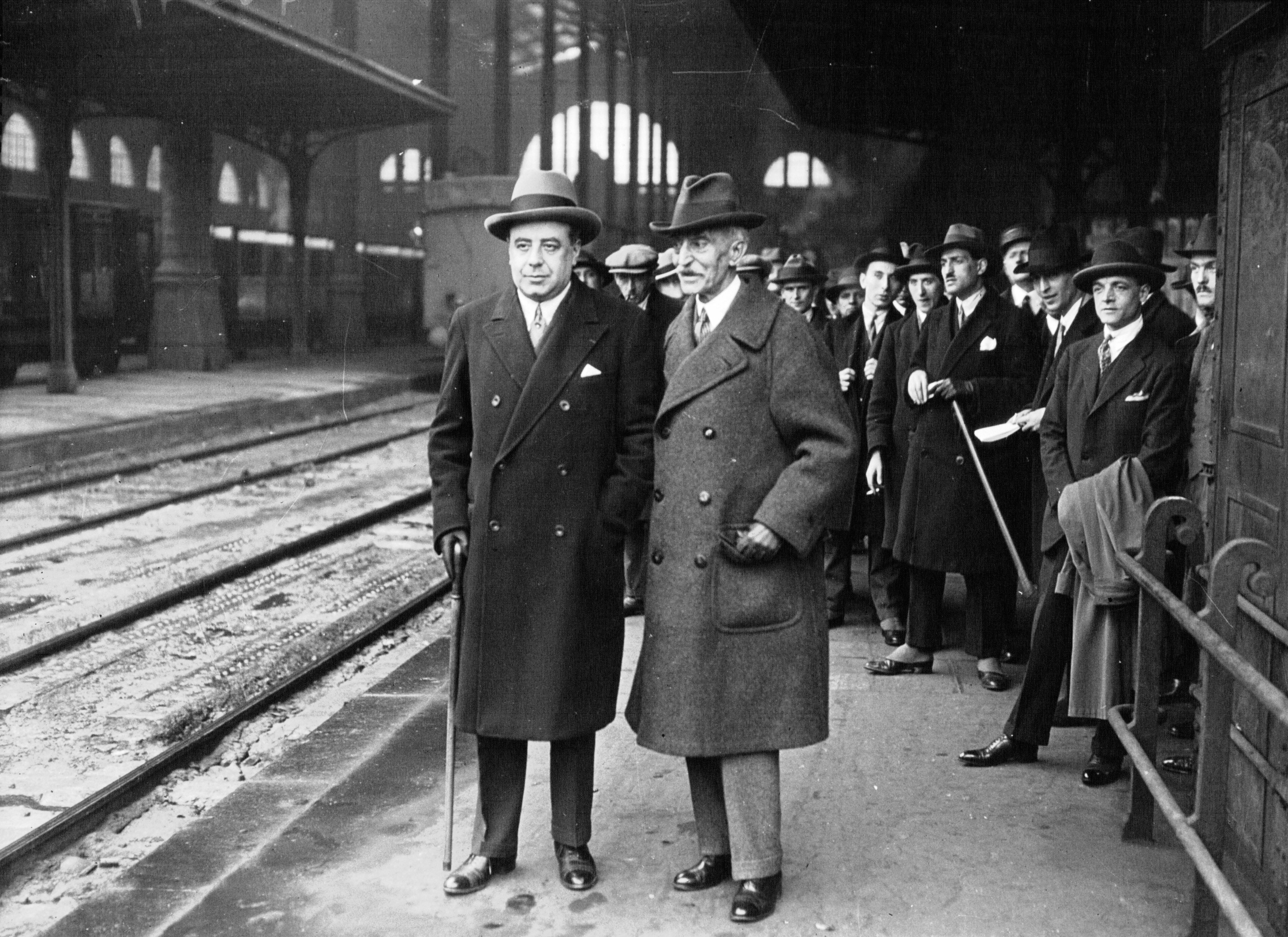
Francesc Macià with his lawyer Henry Torrès about to leave Paris after the trial.

Macià, thanks to the good work of his defense attorney Henry Torrès, was only sentenced to two months in prison and since he had already served them in preventive detention, he was immediately released. He paid a fine of 100 francs for illegal possession of weapons, and was expelled to Belgium.

Garibaldi was sentenced to two months' imprisonment and a fine of 100 francs, and the rest of the defendants to one month's imprisonment and a 50-franc fine. They were all released, because the sentences were less than the time they had spent in pre-trial detention, and expelled to Belgium.

== Consequences ==
Despite the failure, the plot had a wide international echo which caused it, according to Eduardo González Calleja, to take on "an unexpected epic dimension" and give "origin to the persistent myth of l'Avi [Macià], precisely at the time of most low popularity of the Dictatorship and its accomplices in Catalonia". From then on, Macià developed a feverish propaganda activity for the "Catalan cause". In December 1927 he began a trip through Latin America, which culminated in Cuba, where in October 1928 he convened the self-styled Constituent Assembly of Catalan Separatism, from which the Partit Separatista Revolucxionari de Catalunya would emerge. The Provisional Constitution of the Catalan Republic was approved in the Assembly. and it was also decided that the method of struggle would continue to be the armed uprising of the Catalans, although after the failure of the January 1929 coup led by José Sánchez Guerra, Macià decided to abandon the project of a new invasion and opted for organizing an insurrection in the interior of Catalonia, linked to the various anti-dictatorial and anti-monarchist conspiracies that were being hatched at the time.

== See also ==
- Escamots
- 1936 Catalan coup d'état attempt
- Catalan Republic (1931)
- 1929 Spanish coup d'état
- 1926 Spanish coup d'état

== Bibliography ==
- Creus, Jordi; Morales, Joan; Colomines, Agustí (2003). «El judici a Francesc Macià». Sàpiens (en catalán) (6): 22-29.
- Finestres, Jordi; Cattini, Giovanni (2009). «Qui va trair Macià? La trama italiana entorn de Prats de Molló». Sàpiens (in catalan) (84): 42-47.
- Finestres, Jordi; Pujol, Enric (2009). «Conspiracions a l'exili. El complot fallit per alliberar Catalunya de la Dictadura». Sàpiens (in catalan) (84): 36-41.
- González Calleja, Eduardo (2005). La España de Primo de Rivera. La modernización autoritaria 1923-1930. Madrid: Alianza Editorial. ISBN 84-206-4724-1.
