= Florencio Mayé Elá =

Equatoguinean military leader, politician and diplomat

Florencio Mayé
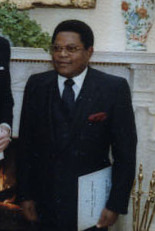
- Mayé in 1983
- Born: Florencio Mayé Elá Mangue; 1944 (age 81–82); Mongomo, Equatorial Guinea
- Occupations: Military leader, politician, diplomat

Florencio Mayé Elá Mangue (born 1944) is an Equatoguinean military leader, politician, and diplomat.

== Biography ==
In the 1960s, Mayé had military training at the General Military Academy in Zaragoza, Spain, along with Teodoro Obiang, Eulogio Oyó, and other future leaders.

Under the dictatorship of Francisco Macías, Mayé was head of the National Navy. He participated in the coup of 3 August 1979, and in the subsequent government of the Supreme Military Council as Vice President and Minister of Foreign Affairs, participating in the signing of the Treaty of Friendship and Cooperation between Spain and Equatorial Guinea of 1980. He was decorated in Spain with the Order of Isabella the Catholic, along with Salvador Elá Nseng and Juan Manuel Tray.

After being dismissed as Vice President by Teodoro Obiang, Mayé served as ambassador to the UN from December 1981 to December 1987, and to Cameroon beginning in December 2006. In September 2008 he was involved in the kidnapping of the political refugee Cipriano Nguema Mba in Cameroon, for which the country declared Mayé persona non grata. Due to this he had to leave office, and was succeeded by Pedro Elá Nguema Buna.

In the 2013 legislative elections, Mayé was elected senator representing the Democratic Party of Equatorial Guinea (PDGE). He is part of the Permanent Commission of Foreign Policy, International Cooperation, and Integration, and of the Permanent Commission of Defense and State Security.

== Personal life ==
Mayé's daughter is married and has children with Teodoro Obiang's son Gabriel Mbega.
