= 1929 Spanish coup attempt =

Failed coup against Primo de Rivera

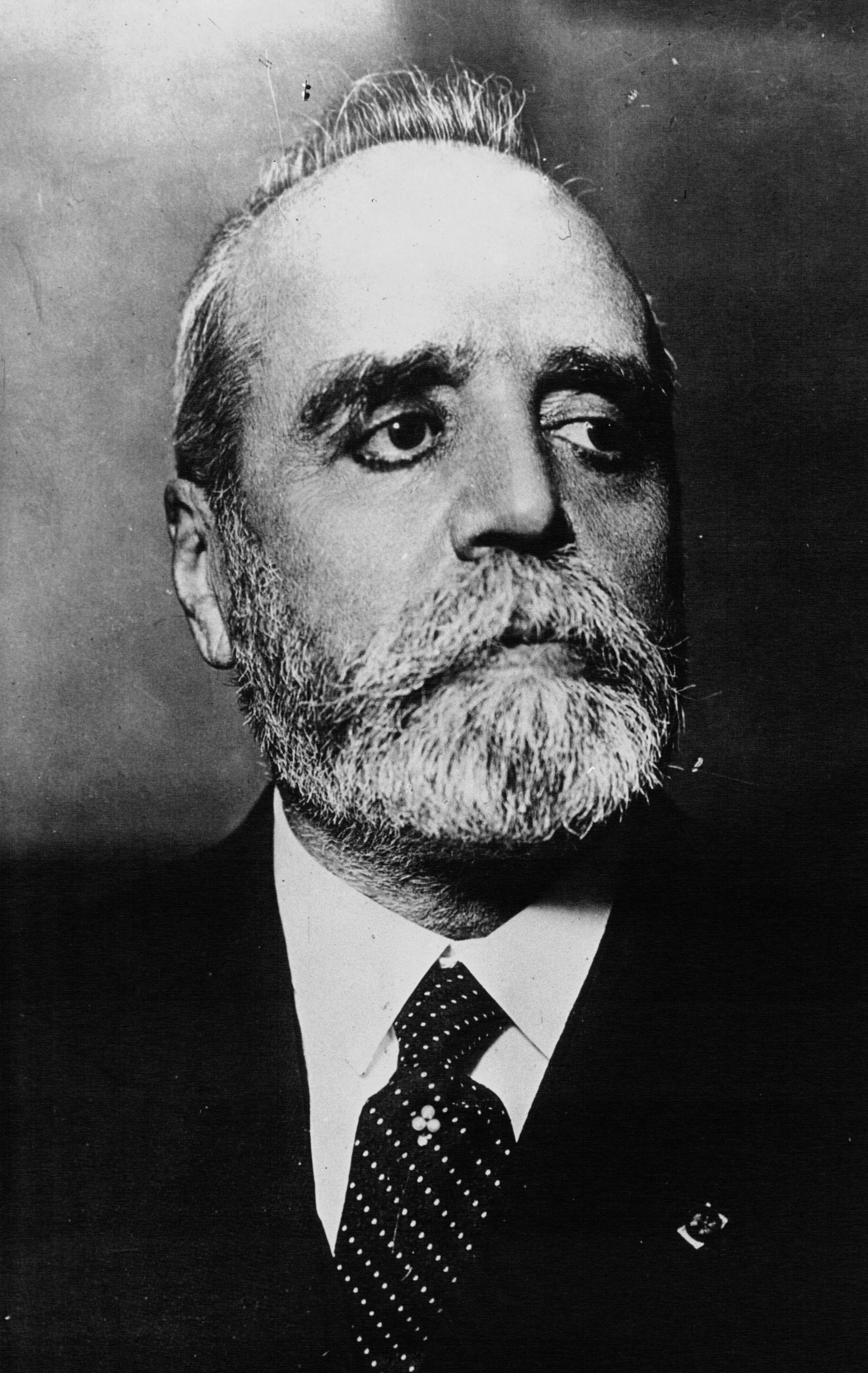
José Sánchez Guerra, 1932

In 1929 there was an unsuccessful attempt to end the dictatorship of Primo de Rivera, which had been established through another coup d'état. It took place in January 1929, with the conservative politician José Sánchez Guerra as its main instigator.

== Background ==
In the second phase of the Primo de Rivera dictatorship, known as the Civil Directory (1925-1930), several generals and officers in the army expressed their dissatisfaction with his policies. The first conflict arose within the Artillery Corps, which strongly disagreed with the open promotion system (meaning promotions were based not only on seniority but also on merits) implemented by the Dictatorship. Primo de Rivera's response was to first suspend all officers in the corps in September 1926 and later dissolve it entirely. King Alfonso XIII attempted to mediate in the conflict by proposing a gentlemen's agreement, but Primo de Rivera vehemently opposed it, threatening to resign and reminding the monarch that the army was under his command. The dissolution of the corps garnered solidarity from other military members, despite initially supporting the open promotion system. The final acceptance of the corps' dissolution by the king was seen as collusion between Alfonso XIII and Primo de Rivera by the Artillery Corps. As historian Genoveva García Queipo de Llano noted, "from then on, a significant sector of the army adopted a republican stance". Additionally, "the conflict... further exacerbated the growing distance between the king and Primo de Rivera".

The first coup attempt to overthrow the dictatorship was known as the "Sanjuanada" because it was planned for 24 June 1926. Generals Valeriano Weyler and Francisco Aguilera y Egea, along with prominent figures from the "old politics" such as the reformist Melquiades Álvarez, were involved in the conspiracy.

A few months later, the "Prats de Molló conspiracy" took place, which was an unsuccessful attempt to invade Spain from the Roussillon region, led by the Catalan nationalist leader and former military officer Francesc Macià and his party Estat Catalá, with the collaboration of Catalan anarcho-syndicalist groups from the CNT.

As noted by historian Santos Juliá, coup attempts were a novelty that the dictatorship itself had legitimized. It was considered permissible to resort to military force (the traditional pronunciamiento) to overthrow a government and change a regime. In this sense, the dictatorship resembled a return to 19th-century politics.

== The conspiracy ==
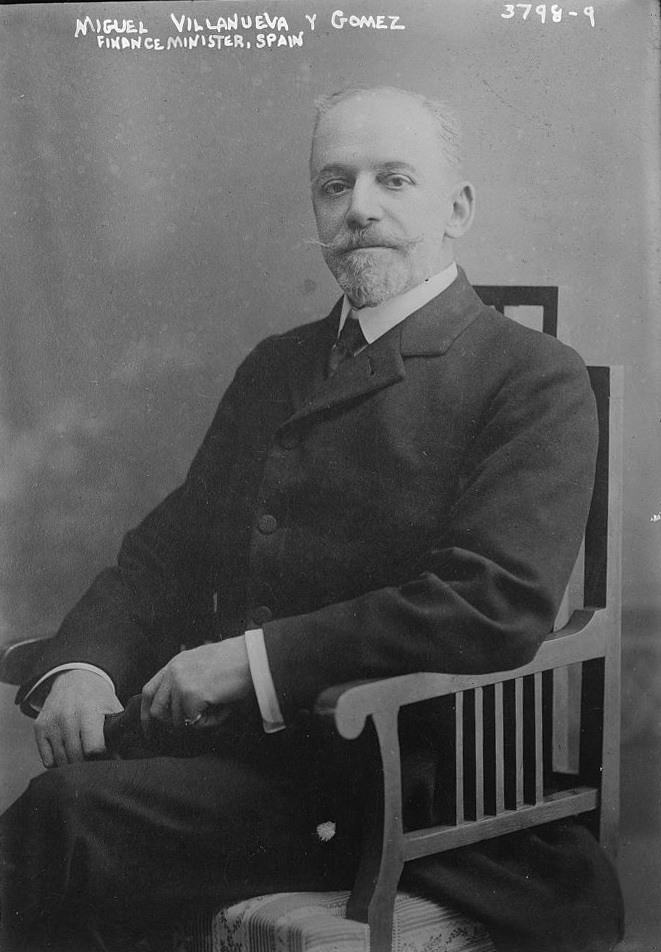
Miguel Villanueva y Gómez, 1915

Among the members of the discredited political parties who stood against the Dictatorship, the conservative José Sánchez Guerra stood out. True to his promise, he went into exile from Spain when the National Consultative Assembly was convened in September 1927. From his exile, Sánchez Guerra began to promote a civic-military conspiracy aimed at ending the Dictatorship. His contact within Spain was the liberal Miguel Villanueva, who had served as a minister in the last constitutional government of Alfonso XIII. Villanueva acted as the treasurer of the conspiracy and directed the self-styled "Revolutionary Central Board," composed of members from both parties of the turn, conservatives, and liberals.

The first meeting of those involved in the conspiracy took place in Hendaye a few days after Sánchez Guerra had settled in Paris. Around twenty individuals attended, including members of the "turn parties," some of whom were former ministers and former presidents of the government, as well as figures from the reformist and republican opposition. Among them were Joaquín Sánchez de Toca, the Count of Romanones, Manuel García Prieto, Melquíades Álvarez, Alejandro Lerroux, Vicente Blasco Ibáñez, and Santiago Alba Bonifaz.

Initially, Sánchez Guerra and Villanueva aimed to return to the 1876 Constitution and form a new government, possibly to be led by a general, likely Dámaso Berenguer, the head of Alfonso XIII's Military Household. According to historian Eduardo González Calleja, the choice of Berenguer "can be understood as an indication of the highly probable collusion with the king, whose differences with the dictator, long evident, had intensified following the formation of the Civil Directory, the establishment of the Patriotic Union as the government's party, and the initial steps toward the implementation of a new parliamentary and constitutional system". However, the ultimate goal of the coup would be to convene Constituent Cortes, thereby gaining the support of the republican parties. Sánchez Guerra also attracted the Catalan nationalist parties through Lluís Companys, who spearheaded the Revolutionary Committee of Catalonia, which also included members of the CNT. Meanwhile, General Aguilera sought military support, especially among the artillery, due to his conflict with Dictator Primo de Rivera. The most valuable support he secured came from the Captain General of Valencia, Alberto Castro Girona.

On 14 January 1929, an agreement was reached to establish a Revolutionary Committee consisting of three members: a military figure (likely General Eduardo López Ochoa), a monarchist (Sánchez Guerra himself), and a republican (Alejandro Lerroux, proposed by Santiago Alba). A significant addition to the platform's political program was introduced: the convocation of Constituent Cortes would be preceded by the departure of Alfonso XIII from Spain, and a referendum would be held to decide the form of government, whether monarchy or republic. Starting from 25 January, several committee delegates traveled throughout Spain to inform the committed military units —21 Artillery regiments and several Infantry and Aviation units— of the date and time agreed upon for the uprising: between two and six o'clock in the morning on Sunday, 29 January.

== The attempted coup ==
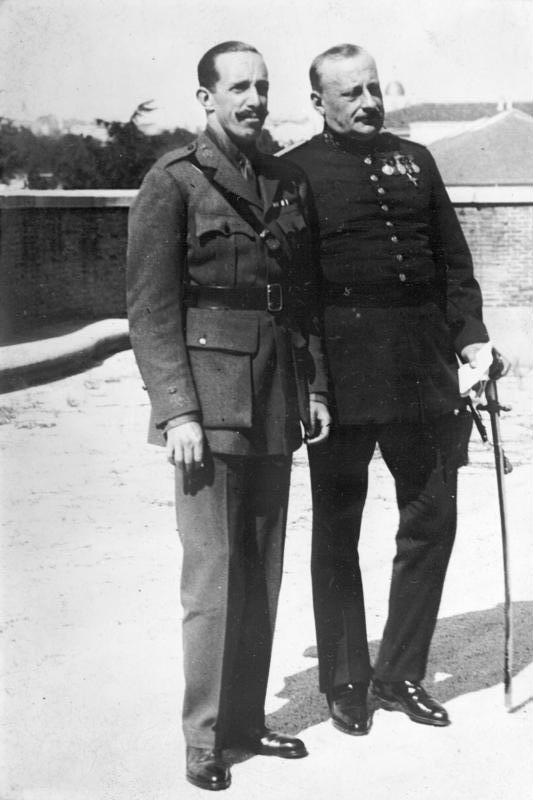
King Alfonso XIII and dictator Miguel Primo de Rivera.

According to the plan devised by the conspirators, the coup would commence in Valencia, where Sánchez Guerra would disembark on the evening of 28 January 1929, subsequently making contact with the Captain General of the military region. Immediately, a general insurrectionary strike would be declared, and the committed military units would rise up. Those in Madrid would have the mission of detaining the king and Primo de Rivera. Alfonso XIII would be expelled from the country, and the Provisional Government, presided over by Sánchez Guerra in Valencia, would call for elections to form a constituent assembly.

However, the plan began to falter when Sánchez Guerra arrived in Valencia twenty-four hours after the agreed-upon date due to a severe storm that had affected the ship transporting him. Upon arriving at the Captaincy General around ten o'clock in the evening on 29 January, General Castro Girona informed him that the plans had to be aborted because the government had control of the situation. Early the next morning, Sánchez Guerra addressed the 5th Artillery Regiment and conveyed that, given the news from other places, it was futile to carry out the uprising, although copies of the manifesto "To the Spanish People, the Army, and the Navy" (in Spanish: Al pueblo español, al Ejército y a la Marina) signed by Sánchez Guerra and concluding with "Down with the Dictatorship! Down with absolute monarchy! Long live national sovereignty! Long live the united and dignified Army!" had been distributed.

The lack of action in Valencia discouraged uprisings elsewhere. In Murcia, General Queipo de Llano, who had traveled from Madrid to lead the coup there, had to return due to the refusal of the Artillery regiment to revolt. The same occurred in Barcelona, where the planned general strike was not even called, and the officers committed to the coup decided not to bring their regiments onto the streets, despite the reproaches made by General López Ochoa, who had moved from Paris, where he had been residing since September 1928, to lead the movement throughout Catalonia. The general López de Ochoa himself recounted these events a year later: "In very harsh terms, I accused them of cowardice and lack of determination, reminding them that not only out of camaraderie but also out of dignity, shame, selfishness, and self-interest, I believed they were obliged to act. I was prepared to lead them with just one unit".

The exception was the Artillery Regiment of Ciudad Real, which revolted at six-thirty in the morning on 29 January, occupying strategic points in the city and its surroundings. By nine in the morning, the government became aware of what was happening and immediately ordered airplanes to fly over the city to drop leaflets titled "To the City and the Garrison of Ciudad Real," urging them to surrender. The artillerymen did not do so immediately because, with communications cut off, they believed that the coup was spreading throughout Spain. However, late in the afternoon, they realized that they were isolated, so they began to vacate the buildings they had occupied. One of the rebel captains recounted it this way: "We knew we were alone. We conferred with the barracks in many compromised towns, and all of them told us that the movement had been postponed indefinitely...".

== Subsequent repression ==
Primo de Rivera's response to the attempted coup was to intensify the repressive nature of his dictatorship. General Sanjurjo, the head of the Civil Guard, was sent to Valencia with full powers to restore order. A decree was approved, granting the government the authority to dismiss, exile, or suspend the salaries of any officials who expressed hostility toward the regime. Additionally, all newspapers in the country were compelled to allocate one-sixth of their publication space for government use. Cultural and social centers where opposition groups to the Dictatorship used to gather were also shut down. Furthermore, in an effort to discourage dissent, officers in the Army and soldiers were obligated to attend special lectures on military discipline, where they were reminded of the "supreme duty of never associating the name of the homeland with seditious actions of a political nature". Finally, Primo de Rivera decreed the complete dissolution of the Artillery Corps, claiming that it harbored "outbursts of Bolshevism" and had inflicted "irreparable damage" on the nation. This last decision led to a new confrontation with the king, who advocated for leniency toward the implicated military personnel.

=== Courts-martial and their consequences ===
The artillerymen from Ciudad Real faced a court-martial, but as noted by Eduardo González Calleja, it became evident that the Army was beginning to withdraw its support from Primo, as some of the vocal members pressed for clemency in the trial (such as the General Navarro). The case was transferred to the Supreme Council of War and Navy, which annulled the death sentences and life imprisonment, reducing the penalties. The Supreme Council's ruling, issued on 18 December 1929, sentenced the 37 officers to prison terms ranging from one to twelve years, with Colonel Joaquín Paz Faraldo of the Regiment receiving a twenty-year sentence.

Sánchez Guerra also underwent a court-martial on 28 October 1929, but he was acquitted. According to González Calleja, this "confirmed the legitimacy of an act of resistance against an illegitimate regime in terms of origin and exercise, and it was interpreted by public opinion as a clear act of military censorship of Primo". A similar assessment is made by Shlomo Ben-Ami: "The trial in which Sánchez Guerra was acquitted by a court-martial, composed of six generals, amounted to a recognition that rebellion against an unconstitutional government was not punishable. The fact that a military court rendered this verdict boded ill for the dictator."

As highlighted by Israeli historian Shlomo Ben-Ami, the "detention and subsequent trial [of Sánchez Guerra] shook the very foundations of the dictatorship and the throne", and "Sánchez Guerra could deliver a severe blow to the regime, not so much as the leader of a farcical rebellion but as a martyr in the struggle against absolutism." A clandestine pamphlet circulated after Sánchez Guerra's arrest stated, "Poor iron chancellor, your fate is sealed". Furthermore, the episode made the king "realize that, if he did not rid himself of the dictator, the erosion of the monarchy's position, even in traditionally loyal areas, would become an irreversible phenomenon".

According to historian Eduardo González Calleja,

Sánchez Guerra's movement marked the beginning of the end of the monarchy, hastening the defection of the historical parties and attracting key figures to the anti-dynastic side in a hypothetical political normalization, such as Villanueva, Álvarez, Bergamín, Burgos, Mazo, and Alba. After the failure of this new insurrectional proposal to overcome the Dictatorship, the constitutional debate irreversibly expanded not only to the throne holder but also to the viability of the monarchical regime as a whole.

This is how dictator Primo de Rivera himself evaluated the outcome of the courts-martial in an article written for La Nación a few days after his fall:

The events in Ciudad Real and Valencia, linked in themselves, but less serious in themselves, in the way the participants in them were judged and sentenced by a General Officers' Court Martial designated in turn, gave me the discouraging impression that the Army, which had been by the side of the Dictatorship with such correctness, loyalty, and citizenship, was turning away from it. All of this came to impress the selfish opinion..., it impressed the King and me, and I began to announce that the Dictatorship had set a limit to its life.

== See also ==
- 1926 Spanish coup d'état
- Civil Directory of Primo de Rivera
- Militar Directory of Primo de Rivera
- Fall of the dictatorship of Primo de Rivera

== Bibliography ==
- Alía Miranda, Francisco (2018). Historia del Ejército español y de su intervención política (in Spanish). Madrid: Los Libros de la Catarata. ISBN 978-84-9097-459-9.
- Barrio Alonso, Ángeles (2004). La modernización de España (1917-1939). Política y sociedad (in Spanish). Madrid: Síntesis. ISBN 84-9756-223-2.
- Ben-Ami, Shlomo (2012). El cirujano de hierro. La dictadura de Primo de Rivera (1923-1930) [(Fascism from above: Dictathorship of Primo de Rivera in Spain, 1983)] (in Spanish). Barcelona: RBA. pp. 103–109. ISBN 978-84-9006-161-9.
- García Queipo de Llano, Genoveva (1997). El reinado de Alfonso XIII. La modernización fallida (in Spanish). Madrid: Historia 16. ISBN 84-7679-318-9.
- González Calleja, Eduardo (2005). La España de Primo de Rivera. La modernización autoritaria 1923-1930 (in Spanish). Madrid: Alianza Editorial. ISBN 84-206-4724-1.
- Juliá, Santos (1999). Un siglo de España. Política y sociedad (in Spanish). Madrid: Marcial Pons. ISBN 84-9537903-1.
