= Academia de Suboficiales de la Guardia Civil =

Spanish law enforcement training center

Coordinates: 40.59939°N 4.13211°W

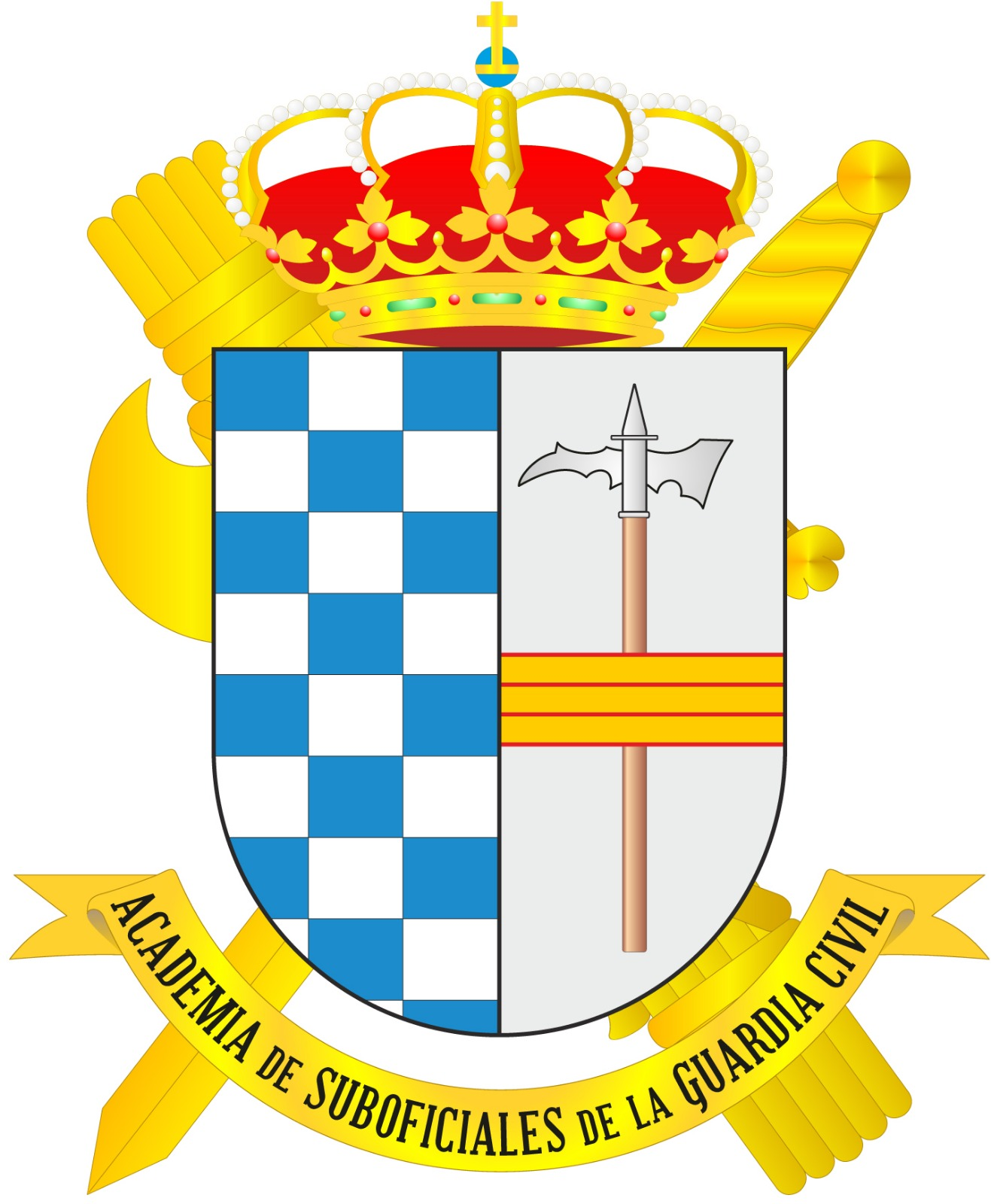
Shield of the Academia de Suboficiales de la Guardia Civil.

The Academia de Suboficiales de la Guardia Civil (ASGC, English: Academy of NCOs of the Civil Guard) is a training center belonging to the Guardia Civil. It is located in San Lorenzo de El Escorial (Madrid), where training is given in security, technical and military subjects for enlisted personnel joining the non-commissioned officers of the Civil Guard.

== History ==
In July 1989, the establishment of the Academy for the Promotion of the Civil Guard was authorized. The academy was set up in San Lorenzo de El Escorial, utilizing the premises formerly occupied by the Special Academy of the National Police.

The Academy for the Promotion of the Civil Guard was formed through the amalgamation of two existing middle management training centers. These were the Instruction Center, which was responsible for the training of officers and non-commissioned officers (NCOs), and the Corporals Academy, dedicated to the training of the corps' corporals.

The Academy for the Promotion of the Civil Guard commenced operations in September 1989, one month after its establishment. Its primary role was to conduct aptitude courses for promotion to the ranks of Corporal, Sergeant, and Lieutenant.

In September 1997, eight years after its inception, the Academy for the Promotion of the Civil Guard underwent a restructuring of its courses. The promotion courses for Corporal and Sergeant were relocated to the Academy of Guards and Non-Commissioned Officers in Baeza, Jaén. Consequently, the San Lorenzo de El Escorial academy thereafter focused exclusively on the courses for promotion to Lieutenant, which was the initial rank for officers in the Civil Guard at that time.

In 1999, further consolidation of training facilities occurred when the Academy for the Promotion of the Civil Guard in San Lorenzo de El Escorial merged with the Special Academy of the Civil Guard in Aranjuez. This merger led to the creation of the Civil Guard Officers Academy, which then served as the singular training center for officers of the Corps.

Following the merger in 1999, the Civil Guard Officers Academy has been directed by a Colonel and operates as a single unit with two distinct sections. These are located in Aranjuez and San Lorenzo de El Escorial, respectively, facilitating a centralized training approach for officers of the Corps.

As of September 2017, all training for Civil Guard Officers, whether by direct entry or internal promotion, has been centralized at the Aranjuez Officers Academy. Concurrently, the facilities at San Lorenzo de El Escorial were repurposed as a dedicated training center for Non-Commissioned Officers (NCOs). This marked the first time in the history of the Corps that a training center was exclusively dedicated to NCO training.

The ASGC was opened in 2018. The students of the ASGC are granted, on an eventual basis, and for the sole academic, internship and remuneration purposes, the rank of Sergeant. The standard course for promotion to Sergeant is 9 months, and the average experience of embtrants to the course is 8 years. Since its opening there has been a reduction in applicants to the academy, with over 1,000 fewer applicants in 2019 than when the academy opened.

== Access to Promotion ==
Annually, the Government of Spain issues a public employment offer which specifies the available positions for promotion within the Guardia Civil's non-commissioned officer (NCO) scale. The selection process employed is a competitive examination exclusive to internal promotion. This opportunity is reserved for members already within the ranks of Corporals and Guardsmen. Eligible candidates must have at least two years of service in their current rank and must not exceed the age of 50 within the year of the application call. Additionally, candidates must meet the educational prerequisites required by the Spanish Educational System to enroll in Higher Level Vocational Training courses, which are a prerequisite for participating in the selection processes for NCO training.

== Education and Training ==
The educational program at the Non-Commissioned Officers Academy of the Guardia Civil spans between two and three academic years. The curriculum includes a combination of instruction and training activities. Notably, it features an internship period lasting up to 20 weeks, during which cadets are placed in various Guardia Civil units to gain practical experience.

The training program for entry into the non-commissioned officer scale of the Guardia Civil is designed to equip cadets with the professional competencies required for their duties and the exercise of their responsibilities. The program focuses on the development of executive actions and the implementation of directives appropriate to their level, ensuring effective performance within the non-commissioned officer scale.

Upon successful completion of the syllabus at the Non-Commissioned Officers Academy, candidates are promoted to the non-commissioned officer scale and attain the rank of sergeant in the Guardia Civil.

== Badges ==
Students enrolled at the Non-Commissioned Officers Academy of the Civil Guard are temporarily granted the rank of Sergeant. This temporary rank is assigned solely for academic, practical, and remuneration purposes during their training period.

== See also ==
- Academia General Militar
- Guardia Civil
