= Avomo =

Avomo is a surname. Notable people with the surname include:

- Christelle Avomo (born 1992), Gabonese R&B/pop singer
- Lino Sima Ekua Avomo (1957–2013), Equatoguinean diplomat
- Pedro Mba Obiang Avomo (born 1992), Spanish-born Equatoguinean footballer
