= Africanist =

Africanist may refer to:

- Africanist (Spain), people who encouraged a strong involvement of the Kingdom of Spain in Colonial Africa
- A specialist in African studies or the languages of Africa
- Pan-Africanism, aims to encourage solidarity among people of African descent
- A strand of African nationalism and activism against apartheid in South Africa associated with the Pan Africanist Congress
- A literary theory developed by author and critic Toni Morrison in her book Playing in the Dark
