= Sergio Hinestrosa =

Equatoguinean footballer (born 1986)

Personal information
- Full name: Sergio Emilio Hinestrosa López
- Date of birth: 17 October 1986 (age 40)
- Place of birth: Valencia, Spain
- Height: 1.86 m (6 ft 1 in)
- Positions: Left midfielder; attacking midfielder

Senior career*
Years	Team	Apps	(Gls)
2006–2008	Carcaixent		
2009	Alicante B	11	(0)
2009–2010	Burjassot	15	(0)
2010–2011	Acero		
2011–2012	Mislata		
2012	Buñol		
2013–2015	Massanassa	14+	(1+)
2015	Barrio del Cristo	9	(1)
2015–2016	CF Chiva	14	(3)
2016	CD Atlético Museros	8	(2)
2016–2017	Carcaixent	9	(2)

International career
2010–2011	Equatorial Guinea	2	(0)
- * Club domestic league appearances and goals

Sergio Emilio Hinestrosa López (born 17 October 1986) is a former professional footballer who played as a midfielder. Born in Spain, he represented Equatorial Guinea in international football.

== Early life ==
Hinestrosa has born in Valencia, Spain to an Equatoguinean father (from Corisco) and a Spanish mother. His uncle, Felipe Hinestrosa Ikaka, was an economist who held several positions in the regime of Teodoro Obiang and died under mysterious circumstances. The airport of Corisco is named in Felipe's honor. His family also includes cousins Ruslán Hinestrosa, a basketball player, and Diana Hinestrosa, the 2023 Miss Equatorial Guinea.

== Club career ==
Hinestrosa played for Carcaixent in the Preferente Valenciana and then he took a leap into the Tercera División (Group 6), where he played for Alicante B in the second half of the 2008–09 season. His other stints in Tercera División were with Burjassot and Mislata. The rest of his club career was entirely in the Preferente Valenciana.

== International career ==
In October 2010, Hinestrosa received his first call for the Equatoguinean senior team and participated in a friendly lost against Botswana by 0–2 in Malabo on 12 October 2010. He played a second match, against Burkina Faso in 2011.
