= 1926 Spanish coup attempt =

Failed coup against Primo de Rivera

In 1926 there was an unsuccessful attempt to overthrow the dictatorship of Primo de Rivera, who had been installed in Spain by another coup d'état in September 1923. The coup attempt, also known as the Sanjuanada because it was planned to take place on the night of June 24, the Night of San Juan, was the first coup d'état attempt against the regime.

== Background ==
Eduardo González Calleja has said that the military policy of the dictatorship "was chaotic and contradictory." The situation could be exemplified by the Morocco problem (first defending the "abandonist" position, supported by the military junteros and questioned by the Africanist military, and then the interventionist position, supported by the Africanists and criticised by the junteros). The situation is also and example of the promotion policy, which became inconsistent and arbitrary.

The management of promotions had always been very controversial, especially in the infantry, where the junteros defended that only seniority should be promoted, while the Africanists favoured wartime merits. Gradually, the dictatorship took control of the Board of Classification of Generals and Colonels, granting Primo de Rivera the final say on promotions and rewarding like-minded military leaders while punishing dissenting voices. A royal decree of July 4, 1926, stated that it was not necessary to inform certain chiefs and officers why they had not been promoted and also denied them any right of appeal. The resulting arbitrariness in promotions (which became particularly evident after the landing of Al Hoceima, when a flood of promotions for wartime merits took place) motivated some chiefs and officers to distance themselves. They began to conspire against the dictatorship by contacting politicians from the parties that had been ousted from power. "Many of the memoirs and political works written by military officers during this and later years reveal personal grievances, rather than an anti-dictatorship militancy based on deep ideological convictions," notes Gonzalez Calleja.

== Conspiracy ==
The first serious conspiracy against the dictatorship was organised in 1925 by the cavalry colonel Segundo García García, although he only had the support of a prominent military officer, General Eduardo López Ochoa. The conspirators, who included prominent figures from the "old politics" such as the Count of Romanones and Melquíades Álvarez (presidents of the closed Chambers), intended to re-establish the Constitution of 1876 and reconvene the parliament suspended in 1923, under the slogan, devised by Romanones, "neither reaction nor revolution; Monarchy and parliamentary regime", although López Ochoa disagreed, arguing that the objective should not be the return to the situation before Primo de Rivera's coup d'état, but to convene a Constituent Parliament. The conspiracy was soon discovered, but Primo de Rivera did not impose severe penalties on those involved, treating them "as if they were naughty cadets," according to historian Gabriel Cardona. "He had not understood that this was a worrying symptom," Cardona adds.

Colonel Garcia continued to conspire from the military casino in Madrid, where he was being held on suspended sentence, and came into contact with the newly formed Republican Alliance, which brought together the Republican parties and was promoted by the Universidad Central professor José Giral. This conspiracy was joined by politicians of the Restoration, such as the reformist Melquíades Álvarez and the liberal Count of Romanones. The conspiracy gained importance when the two most senior generals in the Spanish Army joined it: Valeriano Weyler —apparently instigated by the former regent María Cristina de Habsburgo-Lorena, who feared the identification of her son, King Alfonso XIII, with the Dictatorship— and Francisco Aguilera y Egea. In the end, it was the latter who led the conspiracy, due to Weyler's advanced age, he was around 90 years old, and also because Primo de Rivera had dismissed him from his positions as Chief of the Central General Staff, State Counselor and President of the Classification Board, when news reached him of the interviews he had held with María Cristina de Habsburgo. Some of the conspirators' meetings were held in Weyler's house in Madrid.

Most of the officers involved in the conspiracy were from the Artillery Corps. They were against the decree published on June 9, 1926, which unified the promotion systems in all the Armed Forces and Army Corps, with the exception of the "closed scale" defended by the artillerymen, which consisted of promotions based solely on seniority. The decree also outlawed the practice, widespread among the officers of the Artillery Corps of exchanging promotions for military honours.

General Aguilera's aim was to overthrow Primo de Rivera was and form a liberal government presided by himself or by Melquíades Álvarez, with the Count of Romanones in charge of Ministry of State, Niceto Alcalá-Zamora in charge of the Ministry of Grace and Justice and Manuel de Burgos y Mazo in charge of the Ministry of the Interior. However, the younger generals involved in the coup, such as López Ochoa, Riquelme or Queipo de Llano, were not satisfied with the restoration of the Constitution of 1876 but advocated the convening of Constituent Courts to decide on the form of government, and the younger officers, such as Major Ramón Franco or Captain Fermín Galán, went much further, defending the proclamation of the Republic.

== Failed coup ==
The plan of the conspirators was for General Aguilera to move to Valencia and revolt there, with the support of a revolutionary committee led by Lieutenant Colonel Bermúdez de Castro —the reason for choosing Valencia was that it was equidistant from Madrid, Barcelona and Zaragoza, three fundamental enclaves of the Army—. Next, the compromised soldiers of the capital would rise up in Madrid, with General Riquelme taking command of the General Captaincy —the conspirators also had the support of General Domingo Batet, military governor of Tarragona, and General Gil Dolz de Castellar, Captain General of Valladolid, although he backed out at the last moment, as well as groups of soldiers in Galicia, Andalusia, Aragon and Catalonia—. Immediately Melquíades Álvarez and the Count of Romanones would visit the king to demand the dismissal of Primo de Rivera and the appointment of Aguilera as the new head of government, a position in which he would remain for a short time to give way to a civilian cabinet. The date set for the uprising was the night of June 24, the night of San Juan.

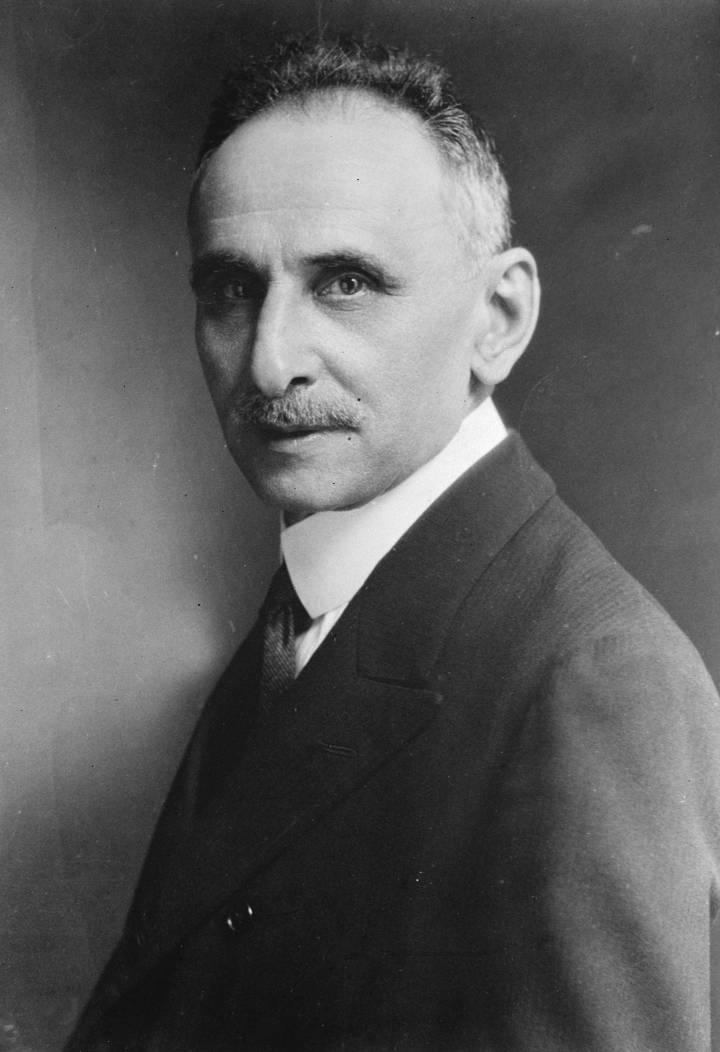
Melquíades Álvarez, author of the Manifesto of the coup.

Melquíades Álvarez was in charge of writing the manifesto of the coup, "To the Nation and to the Army of land and sea", which stated among other things:

The Army cannot tolerate the use of its flag and its name to maintain a regime that deprives the People of their rights.[...] [We demand] the reestablishment of constitutional legality. Reintegration of the Army, for the better defense of its prestige, to its proper purposes. Maintenance of order and adoption of measures to guarantee the constitution of a freely elected Parliament which, as a sovereign body, needs to express the true national will.

In accordancce with the agreed plan, General Aguilera, accompanied by Colonel Segundo García, went to Valencia where he arrived on the afternoon of June 23, but when he met in Godella, a few kilometers from Valencia, with the local leaders of the coup, he found that the committed forces had been greatly reduced —some conspirators had been arrested by the police and others had distanced themselves from the coup due to police action—. Despite this, Aguilera decided to continue, but lieutenant colonel Bermúdez de Castro was arrested and the planned assault on the general captaincy was frustrated. Then, Aguilera decided to go to Tarragona, with the intention of revolting there, counting on the support of the military governor, General Domingo Batet, also involved in the uprising. But the Civil Guard arrested them both at the hotel in Tarragona where they met. The Civil Guard found in General Aguilera's luggage more than two hundred copies of the Manifiesto a la Nación y al Ejército de Mar y Tierra which had been written by Melquiades Alvarez, and which was signed by General Aguilera himself and by General Weyler.

Meanwhile, in Madrid, on the night of San Juan, the Manifesto of the coup was read at the Ateneo de Madrid "in a climate of euphoria", according to Gabriel Cardona, but the security forces controlled the capital and the Civil Guard arrested the group of engineering students who, headed by Antonio María Sbert, were going to take over the Palace of Communications in the Plaza de Cibeles, in order to take over the telegraph service.

One of the reasons for the failure of the coup was that the plan was known by the King, because some of the conspirators had contacted people close to the monarch —Aguilera himself had informed the queen mother María Cristina—, and Alfonso XIII "decided to bet on Primo de Rivera, who seemed safer and, of course, more comfortable" and because "he suspected that, if the Dictatorship fell, it would be very difficult to establish a stable government", states Gabriel Cardona.

== Consequences ==
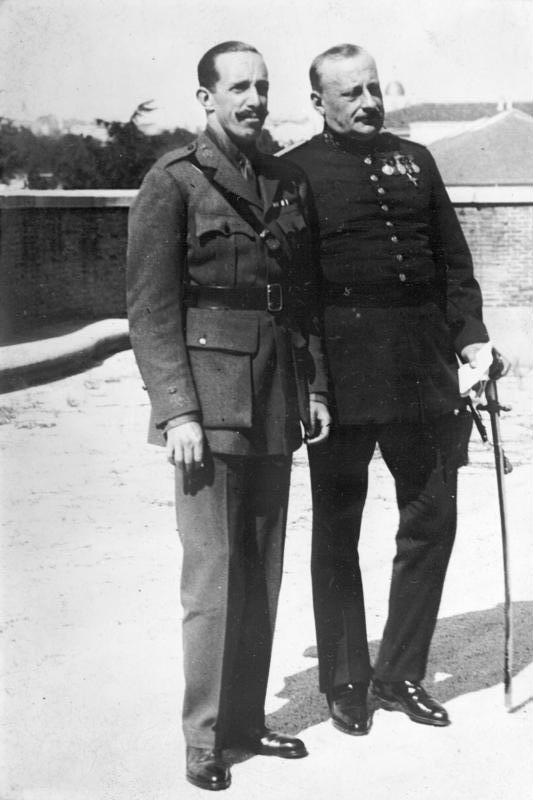
King Alfonso XIII and the dictator Miguel Primo de Rivera.

In addition to Generals Aguilera and Batet, arrested in Tarragona, and Lieutenant Colonel Bermúdez de Castro, arrested in Valencia, Captain Fermín Galán, one of the liaisons of Colonel Segundo García, and several politicians and trade unionists involved, among them Ángel Pestaña, were arrested the same night of San Juan. Later General Weyler was arrested when he returned to Madrid after retiring to his home in Mallorca, awaiting further developments.

On June 26 the newspapers published an "unofficial note" from the Government in which it gave its version of what had happened:

A small number of people, blinded, undoubtedly, by passions, ambition or desperation, had been trying for some weeks to organize a plot, basing it on the fact that a long time has passed without enjoying the liberties or the pure constitutional regime. They yearn, as far as can be seen, for the times prior to September 13 when they enjoyed that and, in addition, terrorism, separatism, impiety, monetary disrepute, world disdain, the disorder in Morocco and the ruin and abandonment of agricultural and industrial production. There they are with their own opinion. The immense Spanish majority demonstrates on a daily basis its love for the perseverance of the current regime and Government.

The Security Headquarters, which has been rendering such brilliant services, has aborted the planned scandal, documenting enough to know the people who were plotting this absurd plot[...].

The mosaic of the conspirators could not be more motley and grotesque: a group of trade unionists, another of republicans and anarchist intellectuals, qualified by their constant demolishing action, some people who, by their age, category and position, nobody would believe them capable of marching in such company and the dozen disgruntled military men of rebellious and undisciplined character, who are the exception of the class, and always voluntary liaison agents for this kind of adventures. [...] The conspirators, naturally, have not found an echo in any social sector and, judging by the mistake they have made, they must not be intelligent people to appreciate the national circumstances and the very powerful reasons, for which a people and an Army, by exception that can be given once a century, give their warmth and support to a change of political regime, something quite different from a vulgar pronouncement in the old style, moved by spite to ambition, united to senselessness.

It does not seem necessary to anticipate the measures that the Government will take in disciplinary and governmental terms, without prejudice to the penalties that the Courts may impose in due course; public opinion will become aware of them, and it is to be hoped that it will be satisfied with the vigor with which the Government takes care of social tranquility and guarantees against disturbances to the national development.

Without waiting for the trial, Primo de Rivera imposed heavy fines on those involved, proportional to their wealth. Thus the Count of Romanones was fined 500,000 pesetas (a fortune at the time), General Aguilera 200,000; General Weyler, Gregorio Marañón and former Senator Manteca 100,000; General Batet 15,000, and others smaller amounts. In Weyler's sanction, it was said that he was sanctioned for "his proven intervention or collaboration, more or less accentuated, in the preparation of events that could cause serious damage to the Nation and for frequently promoting, with his omens and words, unrest in the public spirit and difficulties for the Government of the Country". General Aguilera, for his part, refused to pay the fine, for which the government ordered the seizure of all his assets and his salary.

On April 18, 1927, the court martial was held in which Generals Weyler and Batet, along with 17 other people, were declared innocent —despite this, Primo de Rivera ordered that Weyler's name be removed from the streets or squares that bore his name—. General Aguilera was only sentenced to six months and one day. On the other hand, Colonel Segundo García was expelled from the Army, sentenced to 8 years; Lieutenant Colonel Bermúdez de Castro, sentenced to 6 years and a day; and Captains Fermín Galán y Perea and Lieutenant Rubio Villanuevas, sentenced to 4 years.

The dictator Primo de Rivera tried to minimize the importance of the coup, but as the Republican politician Alejandro Lerroux pointed out, "let it not be said that it was grave: on the bench of the accused was the captain general of the Army [Weyler] and the lieutenant general number 1 of the scale, who had just resigned as president of the Supreme Council of War and Navy [Aguilera]". On the other hand, and in spite of the failure, Melquiades Alvarez, the writer of the Manifesto of the coup, saw something positive in the Sanjuanada: "Bad and unpleasant news it is; but we are already on the road to triumph. The movement already has its head and its idol. The Republic is the work of a very short time".

== See also ==
- 1923 Spanish coup d'état
- 1929 Spanish coup d'état

== Bibliography ==
- Alía Miranda, Francisco (2018). Historia del Ejército español y de su intervención política (in Spanish). Madrid: Los Libros de la Catarata. ISBN 978-84-9097-459-9.
- Cardona, Gabriel (2001). "Se tambalea el Dictador". La Aventura de la historia (in Spanish) (37): 66–70.
- González Calleja, Eduardo (2005). La España de Primo de Rivera. La modernización autoritaria 1923-1930 (in Spanish). Madrid: Alianza Editorial. ISBN 84-206-4724-1.
