= List of ambassadors of Equatorial Guinea to China =

Coordinates: 39.939145°N 116.460699°E

Ambassador of Equatorial Guinea to China
- Incumbent; Germán Ekua Sima Abaga since May 6, 2016
- Inaugural holder: Nvono Ncá Manene Oluy
- Formation: May 19, 1977

Equatorial Guinean Ambassador to China

The Equatorial Guinean ambassador in Beijing is the official representative of the Government in Malabo to the Government of the People's Republic of China.

== List of representatives ==
Designated/accredited	Ambassador	Observations	List of presidents of Equatorial Guinea	Premier of the People's Republic of China	Term end
October 15, 1970		Establishing diplomatic relations	Francisco Macías Nguema	Zhou Enlai	
May 19, 1977	Nvono Ncá Manene Oluy		Francisco Macías Nguema	Hua Guofeng	1979
1979		China's military supported President Francisco Macías Nguema during a 1979 coup.: In 1984 Teodoro Obiang Nguema Mbasogo Nguema visited China	Teodoro Obiang Nguema Mbasogo	Li Peng	1983
February 5, 1980	Salvador Elá Nseng Abegue		Teodoro Obiang Nguema Mbasogo	Zhao Ziyang	1986
1990	Lino Sima Ekua Avomo		Teodoro Obiang Nguema Mbasogo	Li Peng	1995
1996	Bruno Esono Ondó	Ministro del Interior ambassador to Madrid (q.e.d.).	Teodoro Obiang Nguema Mbasogo	Li Peng	1998
1999	Manuel Moto Tomo Mangué		Teodoro Obiang Nguema Mbasogo	Zhu Rongji	2002
2002	Narciso Edu Ntugu Abeso Oyana		Teodoro Obiang Nguema Mbasogo	Zhu Rongji	October 6, 2009
February 14, 2011	Marcos Mba Ondo		Teodoro Obiang Nguema Mbasogo	Wen Jiabao	January 6, 2016
May 6, 2016	Germán Ekua Sima Abaga	(Equatorial Guinea's Press and Information Office).	Teodoro Obiang Nguema Mbasogo	Li Keqiang	
