= Casal Català de Brussel·les =

Social organization of Belgium

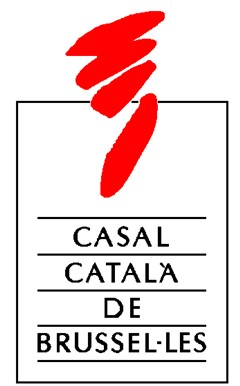

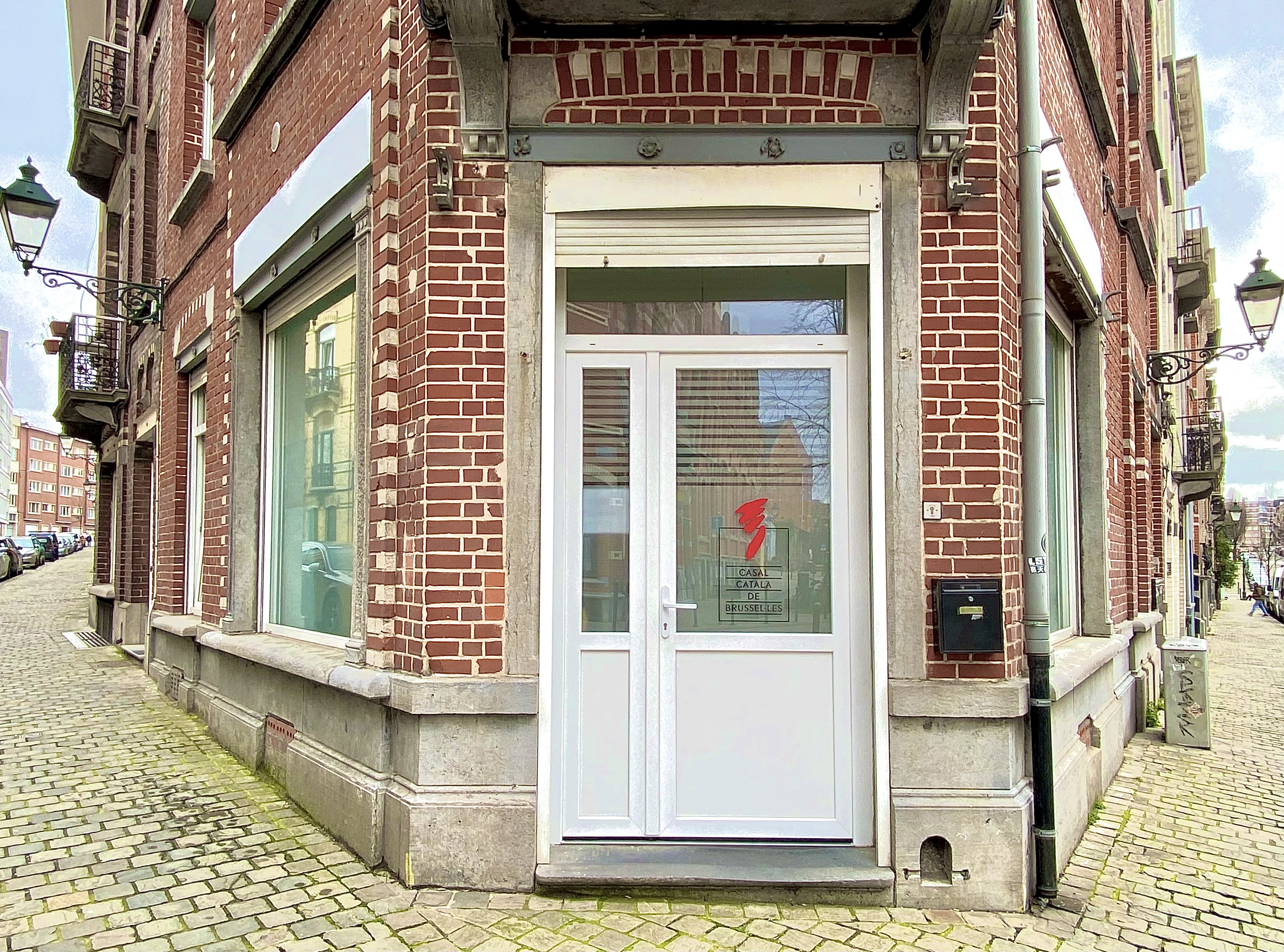
- Founded: 6 December 1930
- Founder: Francesc Macià i Llussà; Bonaventura Gassol i Rovira
- Type: Nonprofit organization, social cohesion, cultural institution
- Location(s): Boerenstraat, 2 Etterbeek, Belgium
- Origins: Exiled Catalan politicians and civilians
- Region served: Belgium
- Website: www.casal-catala.be

Casal Català de Brussel·les (equivalent in English as "Catalan House in Brussels" or "Catalan Home of Brussels") is a nonprofit social organization of Belgium. It belongs to the worldwide network of Catalan Casals and seeks to build cohesion of Catalan citizens and Catalan speakers that live in this European state, as well as to promote the social and cultural reality of Catalonia. It was founded in 1930 and given its location in Brussels, the European capital of politics, it also aims to defend Catalan identity and to project Catalan culture internationally.

== History and activities ==
The Casal Català de Brussel·les was founded in Brussels on 6 December 1930 by a group of Catalan exiled politicians. They were headed by what would later become the President of the Government of Catalonia, Francesc Macià i Llussà, and the writer and politician Bonaventura Gassol i Rovira, after the plot of Prats de Molló in 1926 that aimed to declare Catalonia's independence. From Brussels, Macià i Llussà continued his political task of opposing the Spanish dictatorship of Miguel Primo de Rivera, until, in February 1931, the government authorized his return to Catalonia.

The Casal's magazine along the 1930s was one of the first Catalan-language publications in Belgium and in its beginnings it conducted folkloric outreach activities such as sardanes and cobla performances. In the following years, the Casal acted as a driving force to unite several Catalan politicians, artists and civilians who had to fled from Catalonia due to the repression of the Francoist Spanish dictatorship. Later on, some of them arrived to Belgium in the search for employment opportunities following Spain's entrance to the European Economic Community. Regarding language revitalization, at the beginning of the 1987–1988 academic course it began to offer teaching courses in Catalan to primary and secondary school children.

Since the 21st century, it has also become the historical organization responsible for dressing the Manneken Pis as a Catalan shepherd and wearing a traditional barretina on the occasion of the National Day of Catalonia. At the end of the 2010s, the activity of the entity was distributed in about fifteen annual activities and hosted a supporting group of FC Barcelona (Penya Blaugrana), a kindergarten, informal afterwork drinking sessions, a choir and Catalan and Aranese learning courses.

== Bibliography ==
- Bohigas, Jordi (2020). Catalunya a Bèlgica: història del Casal Català de Brusel·les (1930–2020) (in Catalan). Catarroja: Editorial Afers. ISBN 978-84-16260-88-1.
- Surroca, Robert (2004). Premsa catalana de l'exili i l'emigració, 1861-1976 (in Catalan). Barcelona: Generalitat de Catalunya. ISBN 84-393-6575-6.
