= Salvador Elá Nseng =

Equatoguinean military leader (1940–2022)

- Born: Salvador Elá Nseng Abegue; 1940; Añisoc, Spanish Guinea
- Died: 1 June 2022 (aged 81–82); Malabo, Bioko Norte, Equatorial Guinea
- Occupations: Military leader, politician, diplomat

Salvador Elá Nseng Abegue (1940 – 1 June 2022) was an Equatorial Guinean military leader, politician, and diplomat.

== Biography ==
Salvador Elá Nseng was born in Añisoc, a member of the Fang ethnic group.

From 1963 to 1965 he trained at the General Military Academy in Zaragoza, Spain, along with other future leaders such as Teodoro Obiang and Eulogio Oyó. He came to hold the rank of captain.

Elá Nseng was key in the dismantling of the 1969 coup attempt, when he notified President Francisco Macías Nguema of the attempt and helped him to quell it militarily.

During the dictatorship of Macías Nguema, he served as governor of Río Muni, and was a prison official in Bata, responsible for the execution of several political prisoners.

He fell out of favor after being implicated in the 1976 coup attempt. He was imprisoned at Black Beach, and was released by Teodoro Obiang at midnight on 2 August 1979. He was one of the imprisoned military men who joined the so-called "Liberty Coup", being responsible for leading its troops in the city of Malabo.

After the success of the coup and Obiang's consequent assumption of power, Elá Nseng became the Second Vice President of the Supreme Military Council. He was also in charge of the Finance and Trade portfolios. During his tenure in these positions, he played an important role in establishing the first cooperation agreements signed with Spain and France, at the end of 1979. That same year he was decorated in Spain with the Order of Isabella the Catholic, together with Florencio Mayé Elá and Juan Manuel Tray.

In 1979 he also served as Governor of the Bank of Equatorial Guinea.

In February 1980, he was dismissed from office and replaced by Eulogio Oyó, immediately assuming the post of ambassador of Equatorial Guinea to China. He remained in this position until 1986. He then served as ambassador to Ethiopia.

In the 2013 legislative elections he was elected senator representing the Democratic Party of Equatorial Guinea (PDGE). He was part of the Permanent Commission of Foreign Policy, International Cooperation, and Integration, and of the Permanent Commission of Defense and State Security.

He had a close relationship with President Obiang.

He died on 1 June 2022 in Doctor Loeri Comba Polyclinic in Malabo after an illness.
