= Emilio Blanco Izaga =

Emilio Blanco Izaga (1892–1949) was a Spanish military comptroller, ethnographer and architect, who developed his career in the Spanish protectorate in Morocco. He published a number of ethnographic and architectural essays on the Rif region.

== Biography ==
Born on 15 March 1892 in Orduña, Biscay, he licentiated from the Infantry Academy in 1913. He was destined to Larache, in the Spanish protectorate in Morocco in 1914. A military colonial comptroller in the Spanish protectorate in Morocco from 1927 to 1945, he served as delegate for Native Affairs from 1944 to 1945.

Ascribed to Africanism, according to Alfonso Iglesias Amorín, Blanco fitted better a profile in the vein of the 19th-century Spanish africanists, underpinned by a greater respect for the local population, a greater awareness of the social and cultural fabric of the Protectorate, and a preference for peaceful solutions rather than the africanomilitarismo subset embodied by the likes of Francisco Franco, José Sanjurjo, Emilio Mola, José Millán-Astray and Juan Yagüe, characterised for vying for a rapid military promotion, a lesser cultural acumen and for espousing anti-democratic views.

A Berberophile, he was weary of the Arab and French influences on the Berbers, rejecting both Western and Arab influences in the architecture of the region. Striving towards finding an ideal style from the Riffians, he projected a number of small buildings in the protectorate based on a mashup of ksar from Southern Morocco, Neo-Pharaonic Egyptian architecture and Pre-Columbian models.

A keen researcher of the Riffian customary law, he praised the perks of keeping the local assemblies in force, opposed to the influence dictated by the Makhzen; he got to the point of stating "what is ridiculous (on the Part of the Spanish colonial administration) is not having protected the Rif from Sharia contamination".

He died in 1949 in Madrid.

Juan Bautista Vilar has described him as "probably the most relevant Spanish rifeñista from the 20th century".

== Works ==
- La vivienda rifeña: ensayo de característica e interpretación con ilustraciones del autor (1930)
- El Rif. La ley rifeña: los cánones rifeños comentados (1939).
