= Minister of Finance (Equatorial Guinea) =

Cabinet position

Minister of Finance of Equatorial Guinea is a political position in the Cabinet of Equatorial Guinea.

== Ministers of Finance ==
- Augustin Eñesi Neñe, 1966-1968
- Andrés Ikuga Ebombebombe, 1968-1972
- Andres Nko Ibassa Rondo, 1972-1976
- Daniel Oyono Ayingono Mbá, 1976-1977-?
- Teodoro Obiang Nguema Mbasogo, 1979
- Salvador Elá Nseng, 1979–1980
- Eulogio Oyó, 1980-1981
- Andres Nko Ibassa Rondo, 1981-1985
- Guillermo Nguema Ela, 1985-1986
- Felipe Hinestrosa Ikaka, 1986-1988
- Antonio Fernando Nve Ngu, 1988-1992
- Anatolio Ndong Mba, 1993-1996
- Guillermo Nguema Ela, 1996
- Marcelino Oyono Ntutumu, 1996-1998
- Baltasar Engonga Edjo, 1998
- Anatolio Ndong Mba, 1998
- Baltasar Engonga Edjo, 1998–1999
- Miguel Abia Biteo Boricó, 1999–2000
- Baltasar Engonga Edjo, 2000–2004
- Marcelino Owono Edu, 2004–2010
- Melchor Esono Edjo, 2010-2011
- Crisantos Ebe Mba, 2011-2012
- Marcelino Owono Edu, 2012-2015
- Miguel Engonga Obiang, 2015-2018
- Lucas Abaga Nchama, 2018-2019
- César Augusto Mba Abogó, 2019-2020
- Valentín Ela Maye, 2020-2023
- Gabriel Mbaga Obiang Lima, 2023-

== See also ==
- Economy of Equatorial Guinea
