= Mislata CF =

Mislata
- Full name: Mislata Club de Fútbol
- Founded: 1931
- Ground: La Canaleta, Mislata, Valencian Community, Spain
- Capacity: 1,000
- Chairman: (Spain) Juan José Pérez
- Manager: (Spain) Santi García
- League: Primera FFCV – Group 2
- 2024–25: Primera FFCV – Group 2, 4th of 16
Home colours	Away colours

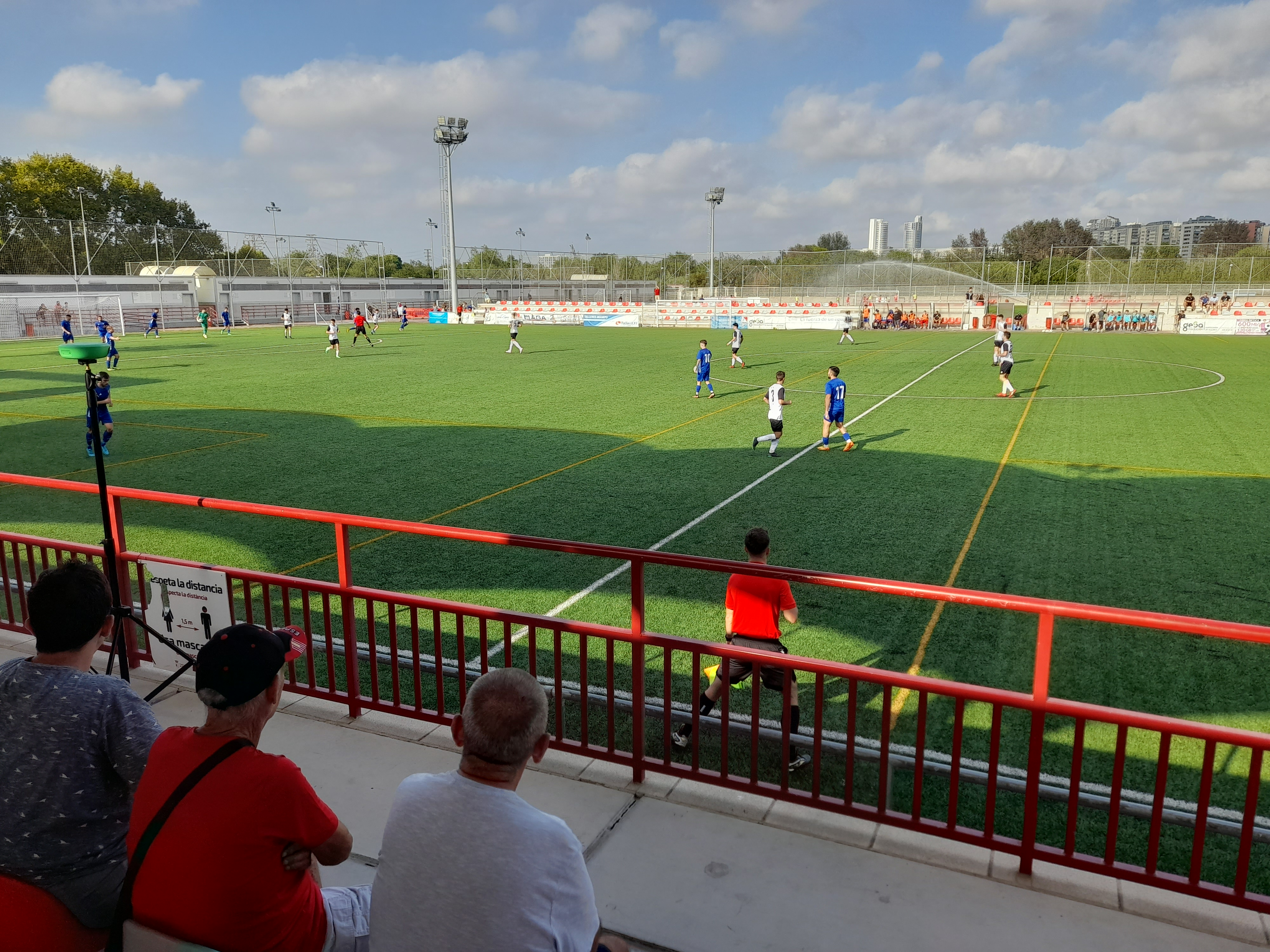
La Canaleta, Mislata CF's ground

Mislata Club de Fútbol is a Spanish football team based in Mislata, in the Valencian Community, Spain. It was founded in 1931 and plays in Primera FFCV – Group 2.

== Season to season ==
Season	Tier	Division	Place	Copa del Rey
1948–49	5	2ª Reg.	1st	
1949–50	DNP			
1950–51	5	2ª Reg.		
1951–52	5	2ª Reg.	1st	
1952–53	5	2ª Reg.	2nd	
1953–54	4	1ª Reg.	14th	
1954–55	4	1ª Reg.	6th	
1955–56	4	1ª Reg.	5th	
1956–1973	DNP			
1973–74	7	3ª Reg.	3rd	
1974–75	7	3ª Reg.	1st	
1975–76	6	2ª Reg.	14th	
1976–77	6	2ª Reg.	3rd	
1977–78	6	1ª Reg.	19th	
1978–79	7	2ª Reg.	6th	
1979–80	7	2ª Reg.	2nd	
1980–81	6	1ª Reg.	10th	
1981–82	6	1ª Reg.	19th	
1982–83	6	1ª Reg.	18th	
1983–84	7	2ª Reg.	1st	

Season	Tier	Division	Place	Copa del Rey
1984–85	6	1ª Reg.	13th	
1985–86	6	1ª Reg.	10th	
1986–87	6	1ª Reg.	10th	
1987–88	6	1ª Reg.	8th	
1988–89	6	1ª Reg.	8th	
1989–90	6	1ª Reg.	12th	
1990–91	6	1ª Reg.	6th	
1991–92	6	1ª Reg.	5th	
1992–93	6	1ª Reg.	3rd	
1993–94	6	1ª Reg.	1st	
1994–95	5	Reg. Pref.	14th	
1995–96	5	Reg. Pref.	16th	
1996–97	5	Reg. Pref.	20th	
1997–98	6	1ª Reg.	13th	
1998–99	6	1ª Reg.	4th	
1999–2000	6	1ª Reg.	5th	
2000–01	6	1ª Reg.	3rd	
2001–02	6	1ª Reg.	3rd	
2002–03	6	1ª Reg.	3rd	
2003–04	6	1ª Reg.	4th	

Season	Tier	Division	Place	Copa del Rey
2004–05	6	1ª Reg.	13th	
2005–06	6	1ª Reg.	9th	
2006–07	6	1ª Reg.	1st	
2007–08	5	Reg. Pref.	6th	
2008–09	5	Reg. Pref.	3rd	
2009–10	5	Reg. Pref.	2nd	
2010–11	4	3ª	12th	
2011–12	4	3ª	20th	
2012–13	5	Reg. Pref.	11th	
2013–14	5	Reg. Pref.	6th	
2014–15	5	Reg. Pref.	18th	
2015–16	6	1ª Reg.	6th	
2016–17	6	1ª Reg.	1st	
2017–18	5	Reg. Pref.	8th	
2018–19	5	Reg. Pref.	16th	
2019–20	6	1ª Reg.	7th	
2020–21	6	1ª Reg.	5th	
2021–22	7	1ª Reg.	1st	
2022–23	6	Reg. Pref.	11th	
2023–24	7	1ª FFCV	3rd	

Season	Tier	Division	Place	Copa del Rey
2024–25	7	1ª FFCV	4th	
2025–26	7	1ª FFCV	15th	
2026–27	8	2ª FFCV		

- 2 seasons in Tercera División

== Notable former players ==
- (Equatorial Guinea) Sergio Hinestrosa
- (Spain) Omar Monterde
