= Alicante CF B =

Spanish football club

Alicante B
- Full name: Alicante Club de Fútbol "B"
- Founded: 1978
- Dissolved: 2012
- Ground: Estadio Alicante CF; Alicante, Valencian Community, Spain
- Capacity: 2,500
- 2011–12: Primera Regional – Group 7, 10th of 16
| Home colours | Away colours |

Alicante Club de Fútbol "B" was a Spanish football team based in Alicante, in the Valencian Community. Founded in 1978, it was dissolved in 2012, and acted as the reserve team of Alicante CF.

== Season to season ==
| Season | Tier | Division | Place | Copa del Rey |
|---|---|---|---|---|
| 1978–79 | 7 | 2ª Reg. | 9th | |
| 1979–80 | 7 | 2ª Reg. | 2nd | |
| 1980–81 | 6 | 1ª Reg. | 20th | |
| 1981–82 | 7 | 2ª Reg. | 11th | |
| 1982–83 | 7 | 2ª Reg. | 13th | |
| 1983–84 | 7 | 2ª Reg. | 9th | |
| 1984–85 | 7 | 2ª Reg. | 12th | |
| 1985–86 | DNP | | | |
| 1986–87 | DNP | | | |
| 1987–88 | 7 | 2ª Reg. | 7th | |
| 1988–89 | 7 | 2ª Reg. | 7th | |
| 1989–90 | 7 | 2ª Reg. | 2nd | |
| 1990–91 | 6 | 1ª Reg. | 14th | DNP |
| 1991–92 | 6 | 1ª Reg. | 9th | DNP |
| 1992–93 | 6 | 1ª Reg. | 11th | DNP |
| 1993–94 | 6 | 1ª Reg. | 1st | DNP |
| 1994–95 | 5 | Reg. Pref. | 19th | DNP |

| Season | Tier | Division | Place |
|---|---|---|---|
| 1995–96 | 6 | 1ª Reg. | 6th |
| 1996–97 | 6 | 1ª Reg. | 4th |
| 1997–98 | DNP | | |
| 1998–99 | DNP | | |
| 1999–2000 | 7 | 2ª Reg. | 2nd |
| 2000–01 | 6 | 1ª Reg. | 4th |
| 2001–02 | 6 | 1ª Reg. | 1st |
| 2002–03 | 5 | Reg. Pref. | 12th |
| 2003–04 | 5 | Reg. Pref. | 1st |
| 2004–05 | 4 | 3ª | 10th |
| 2005–06 | 4 | 3ª | 16th |
| 2006–07 | 4 | 3ª | 20th |
| 2007–08 | 5 | Reg. Pref. | 2nd |
| 2008–09 | 4 | 3ª | 2nd |
| 2009–10 | 4 | 3ª | 20th |
| 2010–11 | 5 | Reg. Pref. | 16th |
| 2011–12 | 6 | 1ª Reg. | 10th |

- 5 seasons in Tercera División

== Former players ==
Note: this list includes players that have played at least 100 league games and/or have reached international status.

- (Spain) Dani García
- (Equatorial Guinea) Sergio Hinestrosa
- (Equatorial Guinea) Sipo
