= Cipriano Nguema Mba =

Cipriano Nguema Mba Mitogo is an Equatorial Guinean politician and military leader.

== Biography ==
As the lieutenant colonel of the Armed Forces of Equatorial Guinea and nephew of the president,Teodoro Obiang, he utilized his Belgian passport to take political asylum in Cameroon in 2003. In September 2008 he was kidnapped by the ambassador of Equatorial Guinea in Cameroon, Florencio Mayé Elá, and sent to Equatorial Guinea.

Following his escape from a prison in Evinayong in October 2010, he fled once again to Cameroon, where he was detained for the second time. He was later able to flee the country and take political refuge in Belgium. During a visit to the capital of Nigeria, Abuya, he was kidnapped again on December 14, 2013 and was sent to Equatorial Guinea. In September 2014 charges of attempted coup were brought against him and he was sentenced to 27 years in prison.

Nguema Nba was released in October 2018 on a presidential pardon. In March 2019, he returned to Belgium to reunite with his family.
