= Lino Sima Ekua Avomo =

Equatoguinean diplomat (1957–2013)

H.E. Lino Sima Ekua Avomo

Permanent Representative for Equatorial Guinea to the United Nations
- Incumbent
- Assumed office 21 May 2003

Equatorial Guinean Ambassador to China
- In office 1990 – 1995
- Preceded by: Salvador Elá Nseng
- Succeeded by: Bruno Esono Ondó

Equatorial Guinean Ambassador to France
- In office 1996–2000
- Preceded by: Pedro Edjang Mba Medja
- Succeeded by: Narciso Edu Ntugu Abeso Oyana

Personal details
- Born: 4 April 1957 Mongomo, Spanish Guinea
- Died: 22 February 2013 (aged 55) Mongomo, Equatorial Guinea
- Spouse(s): Maura Abaga Edu; María Corona Tomo Nguema; Mónica Salvador Obono Asu

Lino Sima Ekua Avomo (4 April 1957 – 22 February 2013) was an Equatoguinean diplomat. He was the Permanent Representative of Equatorial Guinea to the United Nations, with jurisdiction in Canada. He presented his credentials to Secretary-General Kofi Annan on 21 May 2003.

== Education ==
Sima Ekua Avomo attended the Diplomatic School of Madrid, Spain and the Carlos Lwanga National Institute of Secondary Education in Bata, Equatorial Guinea.

== Career ==
Sima Ekua Avomo served as Minister of State for International Cooperation and Francophone Affairs prior to his appointment to the United Nations. He has also served as Director General of International Cooperation in the Ministry of Foreign Affairs, International Cooperation and Francophone Affairs, Ambassador to France with jurisdiction in the United Kingdom, Portugal and Switzerland, and representative to the United Nations Office at Geneva. From 1990 until 1995, he served as Ambassador of Equatorial Guinea in the People's Republic of China with jurisdiction in North Korea, Japan and Indonesia. He has also been First Secretary in the Embassy of Equatorial Guinea in Addis Ababa, Ethiopia, and representative to the Organization of African Unity from 1984 until 1990. From 1982 to 1984, he served as Second Secretary in Equatorial Guinea's Embassy in the Union of Soviet Socialist Republics. from 1980 until 1982, he served as third Secretary of Equatorial Guinea embassy in Cameroon.

== See also ==
- List of current permanent representatives to the United Nations
