= Treaty of Friendship and Cooperation between Spain and Equatorial Guinea of 1980 =

1980 treaty between Spain and Equatorial Guinea

- Type: Bilateral treaty
- Signed: October 23, 1980
- Location: Madrid, Spain
- Signatories: José Pedro Pérez-Llorca; Florencio Mayé Elá
- Parties: Spain; Equatorial Guinea
- Language: Spanish

The Treaty of Friendship and Cooperation between Spain and Equatorial Guinea (Spanish: Tratado de Amistad y Cooperación entre España y Guinea Ecuatorial de 1980) is a bilateral treaty signed on 23 October 1980 in Madrid by the First Vice President and Commissioner of the Ministry of Foreign Affairs and International Cooperation of Equatorial Guinea, Florencio Mayé Elá and the Minister of Foreign Affairs of Spain, José Pedro Pérez-Llorca. The treaty was published in the Boletín Oficial del Estado on 27 July 1981.

== History ==
=== Background ===
After the development of the Diplomatic crisis between Spain and Equatorial Guinea of 1969, relations between the two countries cooled. While on 12 October 1969 a cultural cooperation agreement was signed and subsequently, on 24 July 1971 two more agreements, the regime of Francisco Macías Nguema ceased all diplomatic contacts with the Francoist regime. In the coming years, both countries experienced political changes. In Spain, the death of Francisco Franco in 1975 signaled the beginning of the transition to democracy, and the establishment of the constitutional monarchy of Juan Carlos I and the government of Adolfo Suárez. In Equatorial Guinea, the 1979 coup d'état, subsequent execution of Macías and formation of the Supreme Military Council established the regime of Teodoro Obiang Nguema Mbasogo and allowed the restoration of bilateral relations between the two countries. On 31 October 1979, a cooperation agreement and an action protocol were signed for the first time since 1971, and were followed by a financial cooperation agreement and two protocols on 5 December 1979.

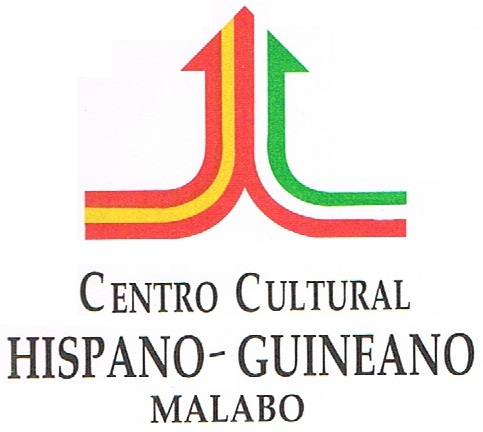
Emblem of the Centro Cultural Hispano-Guineano, of mixed management, which worked for two decades under the Treaty of Friendship and Cooperation between Spain and Equatorial Guinea of 1980.

In 1980, in the months prior to the signing of the Treaty, seven agreements or protocols were agreed between the two countries, among them those that allowed the presence of the Spanish National University of Distance Education (UNED) in Malabo and Bata. In 1982, the Centro Cultural Hispano-Guineano was inaugurated, which after two decades of intense work evolved into the Centro Cultural de España en Malabo (2003) and the Centro Cultural de España en Bata (2001).

=== The Treaty ===
The text began with a recognition of the crisis created by Macías, and the desire of both countries to close it:

Considering:

That after the political change recorded on 3 August 1979, the new Government of the Republic of Equatorial Guinea addressed the Government and the Spanish people requesting their help in rebuilding the country
That relations between Spain and the Republic of Equatorial Guinea, always based on non-interference in domestic politics, then began a new stage, characterized by a profound desire for Cooperation

— Treaty of 23 October 1980 on Friendship and Cooperation
between the Kingdom of Spain and the Republic of Equatorial Guinea

Introduction

After the Treaty, a series of joint ventures were created, 50% owned by each country, including GEPSA (oil, with the participation of Hispanoil), GEMSA (minerals, partly belonged to ADARO, a company of INI), Guinextebak (Banco Exterior de Guinea Ecuatorial y España), CETA (Compañía Ecuatoguineana de Transporte Aéreo) and OFICAR, for urban passenger transport.

A couple of weeks after the signing of the Treaty, Obiang made his first trip to France, on the eve of a tour of Juan Carlos I through Gabon and Cameroon, with a stopover in Equatorial Guinea, in the first half of December. Upon returning from Paris, Obiang made a stopover in Rabat (Morocco).

== See also ==
- Equatorial Guinea–Spain relations
