= Ventura Gassol =

Catalan poet and politician

Bonaventura Gassol i Rovira
- Born: 6 October 1893; La Selva del Camp, Baix Camp, Catalonia, Spain
- Died: 19 September 1980 (aged 86); Tarragona, Catalonia, Spain
- Occupations: Writer, politician

Signature
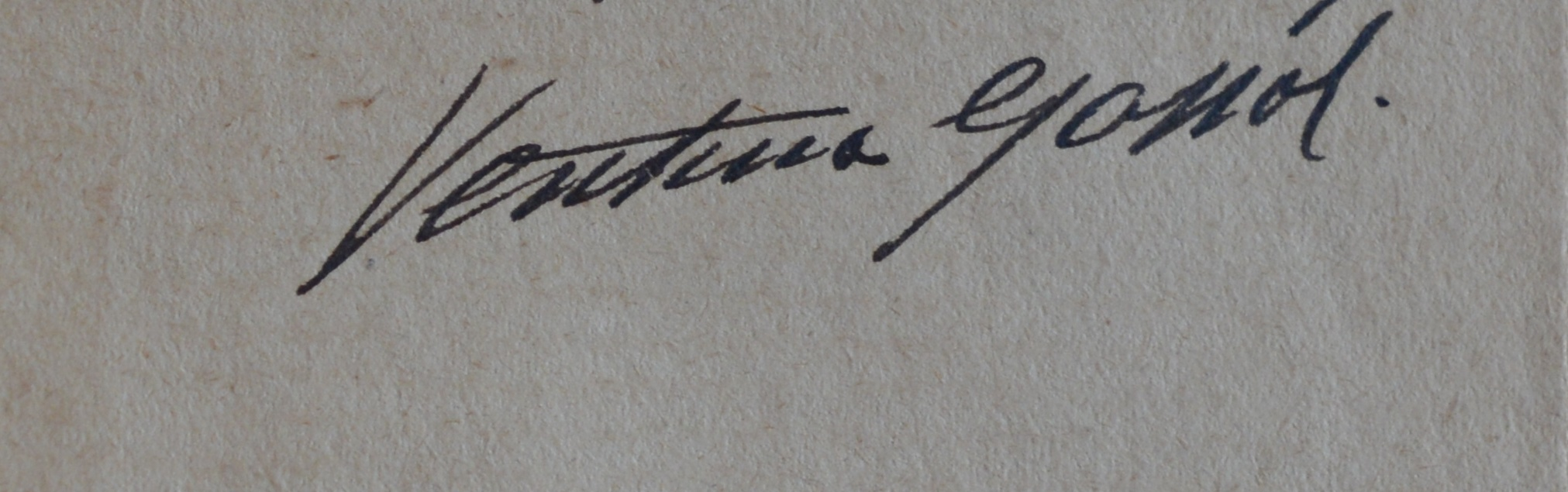

Bonaventura Gassol i Rovira (6 October 1893 – 19 September 1980), known as Ventura Gassol, was a Catalan poet, playwright and politician. A nationalist, he was prominent member of the Esquerra Republicana de Catalunya (ERC, Republican Left of Catalonia).

== Life ==
=== Early years (1893–1924) ===
Bonaventura Gassol i Rovira was born in La Selva del Camp, Baix Camp, on 6 October 1893. He was enrolled in the Pontifical Seminary of Tarragona, where he received a humanistic education. He abandoned his ecclesiastical studies in 1913 and moved to Barcelona the next year. There he joined a charity that protected minors. In 1916 he won a prize for his poetry at the Floral Games of Badalona. In 1916 the Cultural Council of the City of Barcelona was established and Gassol was given a position in the office of Educational Technical Assistance. In 1918 he won a prize at the Floral Games of Sitges. That year he participated in the electoral campaign of the Lliga Regionalista, which was in favor of autonomy for Catalonia.

Gassol began to contribute to magazines and won local awards for his poetry, which was published in his first collection in 1917, Àmfora. In 1920 he published another collection, La nau (The Ship). In 1921 he staged a dramatic poem in three acts, La cançó del vell Cabrés (Song of the Old Goat). He also began to publish short stories and novels, although these were less successful than his poetry and drama. His 1923 collection of patriotic poem, Les tombes flamejants (The Flaming Tombs) was given good reviews. In 1922 he married Esperança Galofré, with whom he had two children. The same year he was one of the founders of the nationalist political party Acció Catalana (Catalan Action), created from the National Catalan Conference.

=== First exile (1924–30) ===
General Miguel Primo de Rivera was dictator of Spain from 1923 to 1930. In 1924 Gassol was threatened with jail and fled to France, where he became acquainted with Francesc Macià, the future president of Catalonia. In 1926 he was one of the ringleaders of the Prats de Molló plot, where a group of militants attempted to launch an invasion from French territory. Gassol was arrested by the French police in Perpignan and taken to Paris, where he was tried and convicted along with Macià and forty other Catalans. In 1927 he went into exile in Belgium. In 1928 Grassol and Macià visited Uruguay, Argentina, Chile, New York and Cuba, where they helped draft the Interim Constitution of the Catalan Republic. In Havana he participated in creating the Partit Separatista Revolucionari Català (Catalan Revolutionary Separatist Party). He returned to Belgium and in 1929 was living in Brussels, where he founded, helped by other exiles (especially Francesc Macià i Llussà), the Casal Català de Brussel·les. After the end of the dictatorship of Primo de Rivera in 1930 Gassol spent a few days in the Figueres prison and then was allowed to return to Barcelona.

=== Second Spanish Republic (1931–36) ===
After his return Gassol rejoined the culture committee. In 1931 Grassol was one of the founders of the Republican Left of Catalonia. He soon became a public figure due to his effective oratory. The Catalan Republic was proclaimed on 14 April 1931. Gassol addressed the crowd from the palace balcony in the Plaça de Sant Jaume in Barcelona. Macià was elected president of the government. Gassol was appointed Minister of the Interior, and a few days later was named Minister of Culture of the Generalitat of Catalonia. Gassol promoted a secular Catalan culture that would meet the needs of all social classes. He decreed compulsory bilingual teaching in schools, and created the Normal School and the Institute-School, where teachers were trained in Catalan. He established a Radio Committee to study the structure of radio in Catalonia and the potential for using the medium to spread culture. Josep Tomàs i Piera represented Ràdio Barcelona on the committee.

In 1931 Gassol was elected a deputy to the Constituent Cortes, where he defended the Catalan language and the Statute of Autonomy. He delivered the funeral elegy for Francesc Macià. He retained the position of Minister of Culture in the succeeding government of Lluís Companys. During the events of 6 October 1934 President Lluís Companys proclaimed the Catalan State within the Spanish Federal Republic. As a result, the whole Catalan government was imprisoned, including Gassol. He was detained in the vessel Uruguay, then transferred to the prison in Cartagena. They were reinstated in their positions after the victory of the Left in the February 1936 national elections.

=== Second exile and last years (1936–80) ===
During the first months of the Spanish Civil War (1936–39) Ventura Gassol tried to ensure the safety of various threatened people and to preserve religious monuments. Gassol went into exile in France by airplane on 23 October 1936, and announced his resignation from the Ministry of Culture on 17 December 1936. In 1937 he organized the Exposició d'Art Català (Exposition of Catalan Art) in Paris. World War II began in September 1939. Gassol continued to contribute to the Revista de Catalunya in exile. In 1941 he was persecuted by the Nazis and spent three months in prison in Aix-en-Provence. After his release he made a secret move to Lausanne. His wife and two children managed to go to Mexico, where his wife died in 1944.

In 1946 Gassol settled on a farm in the Touraine in France. He married Lucia Wilde in Lausanne on 27 January 1947. In 1954 the Catalan deputies in Mexico elected him president of the government in exile, but he refused the post. He maintained good relations with the new president, Josep Tarradellas. He sold his farm and moved to Tours in 1972. Democratic elections were held in Spain on 15 June 1977. Two weeks later Gassol returned to Barcelona with his wife. He received many honors in Catalonia. He spent the last years of his life in Selva del Camp. He died in Tarragona on 19 September 1980, aged 86.

== Works ==
Selected works include:

=== Poetry ===
- Àmfora (Barcelona, 1917)
- La Nau (Barcelona, 1920)
- Les tombes flamejants (Valls, 1923)
- Mirra (Badalona, 1931)
- Poemes 1917-1931 (Barcelona, 1934)
- Miratges (Lausanne, 1950)
- Balada del bressol (la Selva del Camp, 1977)

=== Theater ===
- La cançó del vell Cabrés (Barcelona, 1921)
- La Dolorosa (Valls, 1928)
- L’home i la bèstia (melodrama inspired by the Strange Case of Dr Jekyll and Mr Hyde by Robert Louis Stevenson). In collaboration with J. Carner-Ribalta (1934)
- La mort de l’ós (Barcelona, 1935)

=== Prose ===
- El preu de la sang (Barcelona, 1923)
- L’Oncle Neus. L’ombra del diable. L’escorçó del destí (Barcelona)
- El mur de roses (Barcelona, 1924)
- Mossèn Gabriel (Barcelona, 1924)
- En Joan de les Campanes (Barcelona, 1926)

== Sources ==
- AELC (2015). "Ventura Gassol" (in Spanish). Associació d'Escriptors en Llengua Catalana.
- Palomas i Moncholí, Joan (2015). "Josep Tomàs i Piera". memoriaesquerra.cat (in Catalan). Fundació Josep Irla. Archived from the original on 2015-09-28.
- "Ventura Gassol" (in Catalan). Selva del Camp. 2011.
