= Eulogio Oyó =

Equatoguinean military leader (1942–2013)

- Born: Eulogio Oyó Riqueza; 5 May 1942; Baney, Spanish Guinea
- Died: 4 March 2013 (aged 70); Madrid, Spain
- Occupation(s): Military leader, politician, diplomat

Eulogio Oyó Riqueza (5 May 1942 – 4 March 2013) was an Equatorial Guinean military leader, politician, and diplomat.

== Biography ==
Eulogio Oyó Riqueza was born in Santiago de Baney (Bioko) in Spanish Guinea, on 5 May 1942. He belonged to the Bubi people. In the 1960s he traveled to Francoist Spain and studied at the General Military Academy in Zaragoza, where he graduated as ensign along with Teodoro Obiang Nguema Mbasogo and other colleagues. After his training, he was assigned to the city of Malabo.

During the presidency of Francisco Macías Nguema, he was forced to leave his military post. He participated in the 1979 Equatorial Guinea coup d'état, which brought Obiang to power. After the coup, Eulogio Oyó held numerous public positions, including Governor of the Insular Region, Vice President of the Supreme Military Council, Minister of Finance (1980-1981) and Ambassador to the Organisation of African Unity.

Oyó Riqueza died on 4 March 2013 in Madrid, being buried a few days later in Baney.
