= Felipe Hinestrosa Ikaka =

Equatorial Guinean politician (died 1998)

Felipe Hinestrosa Ikaka was an Equatorial Guinean politician and cabinet minister.

Hinestrosa Ikaka was a Benga, from the island of Corisco. born on 17 May 1951. He had a degree in economics from Spain.

He was appointed Minister of Finance in January 1986 until September 1988, when Obiang Nguema replaced him. Later in 1992 he was appointed vice-minister of economy and commerce. In 1996 he was appointed minister responsible for employment. He was the president of the Association of the Friends of Obiang Nguema. Hinestrosa Ikaka died in 1998 or 1997. He was allegedly poisoned.
