= Melquíades Álvarez (politician) =

Spanish politician (1864–1936)

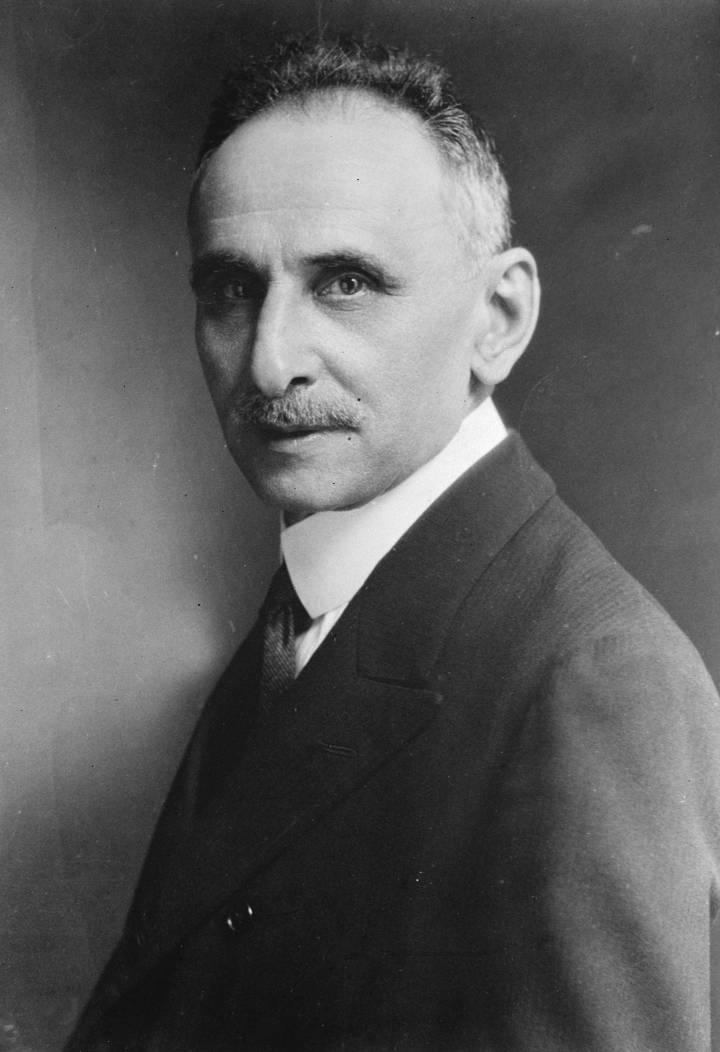
- Born: Melquíades Álvarez Gónzalez-Posada; 17 May 1864; Gijón, Spain
- Died: 22 August 1936 (aged 72); Cárcel Modelo, Madrid, Second Spanish Republic
- Cause of death: Execution by shooting
- Education: University of Oviedo
- Occupations: Politician, lawyer, journalist

Melquíades Álvarez Gónzalez-Posada (17 May 1864 – 22 August 1936) was a Spanish Republican politician, founder and leader of the Reformist Republican Party (Partido Republicano Reformista), commonly known just as Reformist Party and President of the Congress of Deputies between 1922 and 1923.

== Biography ==
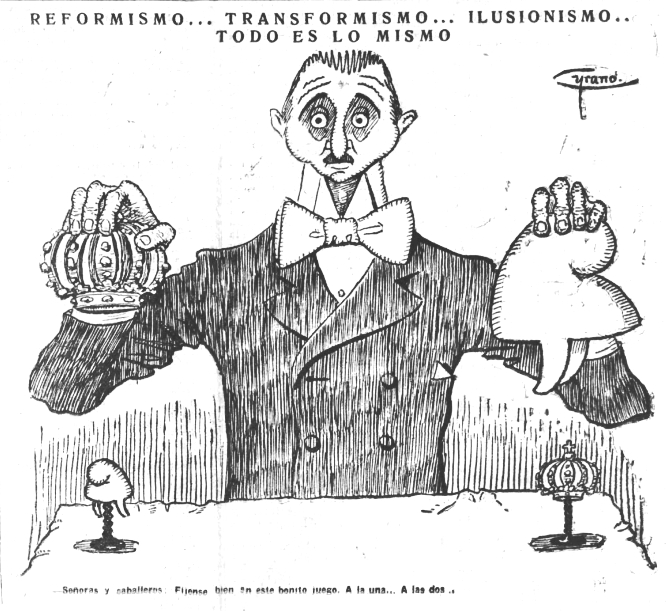
Cartoon highlighting the ambiguous discourse of Melquíades about monarchy and republic

He studied Law at the University of Oviedo (Asturias) and collaborated with Asturian liberal newspapers. He was friend of the famous writer Clarín and he started working as a lawyer in Oviedo.

In 1898 he was elected to the Congress as Liberal candidate and was appointed Professor of Roman Law at the University of Oviedo. In 1899, he turned into Republican and in 1906 he was elected Republican congressman. He was one of the organizers of the Liberal Block in 1908 against the Conservative Prime Minister Antonio Maura and of the Republican-Socialist Conjunction in 1909. In 1912, he founded with Gumersindo de Azcárate and José Ortega y Gasset the Reformist Party and the League for the Spanish Political Education. In the 1914 elections, 11 Reformist congressmen were elected. It had also a great success in the municipal elections in Asturias. During the Second Republic he founded the Democratic Liberal Republican Party (Partido Republicano Liberal Democrático), but its electoral results were poor: two deputies in 1932 and ten in 1933, when they supported the right-wing government backed by the Spanish Confederation of the Autonomous Right (CEDA).

After the beginning of the Civil War, anarchist militias imprisoned and killed him in the Cárcel Modelo. Following the murder of Alvarez together with other political prisoners, President Azaña is said to have cried; Indalecio Prieto predicted the fall of the Republican government: "with this brutality we have lost the war."

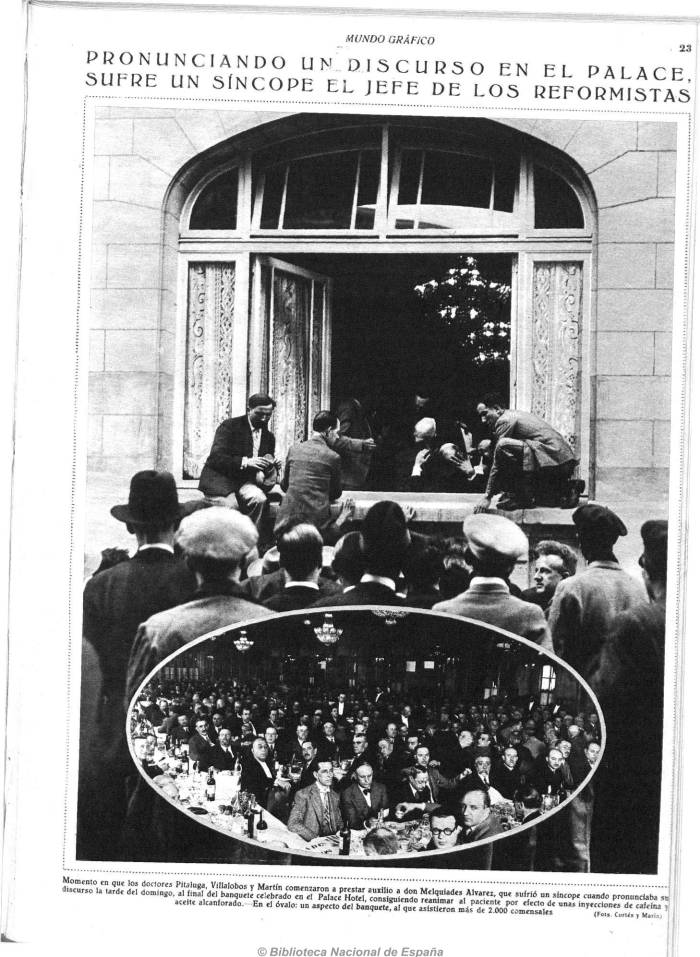
Moment in which Melquíades Álvarez is given help by fellow party members, after suffering a syncope when delivering a speech in front of the Palace Hotel. The oval shows the banquet to which Melquíades assisted before this event.

Among the various efforts and commitments that Melquíades Álvarez developed or launched throughout his life, the creation in Asturias of athenæums and popular libraries can be highlighted, following the spirit and example proposed by different pedagogues to make "education available to workers". Melquiades has different named streets in Oviedo, Gijón, La Felguera, Madrid, Leganés and Tomelloso.

In the few decades up to 2021, over twenty books and academic studies were published about Álvarez's political life.

== See also ==
- 1926 Spanish coup d'état

== Bibliography ==
- Álvarez, Melquíades: Antología de discursos (prepared by José Girón Garrote), Oviedo: Real Instituto de Estudios Asturianos, 2000
- Añigo, Luis: "Melquíades Álvarez, ¿eterno equivocado?", Cuadernos Republicanos, 37 (1999), pp. 85–100
- García Venero, Maximiano: Melquíades Álvarez: historia de un liberal, Madrid: Tebas, 1974 (2nd edition)
- Íñigo, Luis: Melquíades Álvarez: un liberal en la Segunda República, Oviedo: Real Instituto de Estudios Asturianos, 2000
- Redondo, Gonzalo (1993). Historia de la Iglesia en España, 1931–1939: La Guerra Civil, 1936–1939. Madrid: Rialp. ISBN 84-321-3016-8.
- Suárez, Manuel: "Melquíades Álvarez y la democracia liberal en España", in Moreno, Javier (coord.): Progresistas: biografías de reformistas españoles, Madrid: Taurus, 2006, pp. 233–270
