= General Military Academy =

Military Academy for future officers of the Spanish Army and Civil Guard

Coordinates: 41.6994°N 0.8720°W

- Coat of Arms of the General Military Academy
- Active: 1882–1931, 1940–present
- Country: Spain
- Allegiance: Spain
- Branch: Spanish Army
- Type: Training
- Role: Basic training of future officials of the Army and of the Civil Guard
- Website: General Military Academy

Commanders
- Director: Jerónimo de Gregorio y Monmeneu

The General Military Academy (in Spanish: Academia General Militar) is a higher training center of the Spanish Army, responsible for the initial training for officers of the Arms and Corps of the Army, and for the officers of the Civil Guard. It is currently located in Zaragoza.

== History ==
=== First era ===
The General Military Academy was founded under the reign of Alfonso XII, on February 20, 1882. The first training center was located in Alcázar of Toledo. The first head of the Academy was the General Méndez The Great.

The Academy was dissolved on February 8, 1893 by the then Minister of War, General López Domínguez. From then on the Armed Forces and Corps had their own separate training centers.

=== Second era ===
In 1927, during the reign of Alfonso XIII, and under the dictatorship of Primo de Rivera, the center was reestablished in Zaragoza. Primo de Rivera came to the conclusion that one of the reasons of the dissents between the Armed Forces on the promotion system based on seniority or merits of war was based on the lack of an academy in which all four Army Corps were trained together. After the Alhucemas landing, Primo de Rivera developed a great admiration for Francisco Franco, a soldier with a great reputation after the African campaigns and the foundation of the Tercio de Extranjeros with José Millán Astray. On January 4, 1928, by Royal Decree, Franco was named Director of the General Military Academy.

Historian Eduardo González Calleja interpreted the designation of Franco as "a gesture of reconciliation with Africanists, achieved after the operation of summer 1925. Both Primo and Franco, and the majority of colonial soldiers that formed the teacher board wanted to train a kind of official not study-oriented, with a knightly concept of the profession and without any relationship with the social media at the time whatsoever".

After the Second Republic was established and the military reforms were applied in June 1931 by the provisional Ministry of War, the center was closed. Azaña did not trust the instructions provided at the center and believed its budget was huge in a moment in which military spending was trying to be cut. Conservative, anti-republican officials, thought the closure of the Academy was an attack to the very spirit of the Army, since the Academy was the only place in Spain in which soldiers of all kinds studied together. Franco was devastated, and after the end of the Civil War he restored the institution. However, he obeyed Azaña's commands at the time and closed the Academy.

=== Third era ===
After the end of the Spanish Civil War and the reorganization of military studies in Spain, the General Military Academy was established again on September 27, 1940 by Minister of the Army José Enrique Varela. The old buildings used for training in the second era were used. In 1942, 170 students started studying in the Academy. Francisco Hidalgo de Cisneros y Manso de Zúñiga was named Director of the Academy. Notable alumni are Juan Carlos I of Spain and his son Felipe VI of Spain, and future queen of Spain Leonor, Princess of Asturias (daughter of Felipe VI and Queen Letizia of Spain).

== Current curriculum ==
The General Military Academy is a medium-sized, highly residential baccalaureate college, with a full-time, five-year undergraduate program that emphasizes instruction in the arts, sciences, and professions with a graduate program, preparing men and women to take on the challenge of being officers of the Spanish Army and the Civil Guard. The academy is accredited by the Ministry of Education, Culture and Sport and is a directly reporting agency of the Army general staff.

=== Undergraduate program - academic ===
The academic program consists of a structured core of subjects depending on the cadet's chosen specialty as a future Army officer, balanced between the arts and sciences. For Civil Guard cadets, additional training is focused on their law enforcement role. Regardless of major, all cadets graduate with a Bachelor of Science degree with assistance from the Central Defense University and the University of Zaragoza.

=== Undergraduate program - military ===
As all cadets are commissioned as lieutenants upon graduation, military and leadership education is nested with academic instruction. Military training and discipline fall under the purview of the Office of the Commandant of Cadets. Entering freshmen, or 4th class cadets, are referred to as New Cadets, and enter the academy on Reception Day (in September) to start off their military service training as future officers and are recognized as full cadets in a ceremony in January the following year, where they make their pledge to the National Colour and receive ceremonial daggers. The 2nd, 3rd, and 4th years of study as cadets and their final year as commissioned second lieutenants, aside from the usual academic work in military and civil subjects, also involve specialty training in the combat arms of the Army in their respective combat training schools, and for the Civil Guard, alongside military instruction its cadets receive speciality training within its own institutions for law enforcement training in various specialties suited for potential graduates.

== Bibliography ==
- Blanco Escolá, Carlos (1989). La Academia General Militar de Zaragoza (1928-1931). Labor.
- Izquierdo, José; Ortiz de Zárate, José Ramón; Aparicio, Ángel (2011). La Academia General Militar. Crisol de la oficialidad española (in Spanish). Institución Fernando el Católico (CSIC). ISBN 9788499111377.
- Jackson, Gabriel (1966). La República española y la guerra civil (1931-1939) (in Spanish). Crítica. ISBN 8474239486.
- Preston, Paul (1993). Franco. "Caudillo de España" (in Spanish). Barcelona: Grijalbo Mondadori. ISBN 8497594770.
