= Draft Constitution of the Catalan Republic of 1928 =

The Draft Constitution of the Catalan Republic of 1928, commonly known as the Constitution of Havana (the place where it was written), was born as one of several attempts to raise the Catalan community to the status of an independent state.

In the period between the First World War and 1931, a number of factors contributed to the rise of nationalist activity in Catalonia: the birth of the Irish state, the creation of several European countries from the disintegration of the European Empires, the admission of the right of self-determination by both the Americans (Woodrow Wilson) and the Soviets (Lenin), and the decline of the Spanish Empire (which lost its colonies of Cuba and The Philippines), against the backdrop of the growth of the Catalan economy.

This resulted in the creation of the separatist Constituent Assembly of Catalonia in Havana, Cuba, chaired by Francesc Macià. This assembly approved the Constitution of Havana on 30 September and 1 and 2 October 1928, as their project of giving a Provisional Constitution for a Catalan Republic.

The Draft Constitution was written by Josep Conangla i Fontanilles (Montblanc 1875 – Havana 1965), a Catalan essayist and poet living in Havana, and the leading Catalan separatist in the Americas during the 20th Century.

In 1931 the Second Spanish Republic was proclaimed, but the lack of a strong leader and mature separatist party extinguished the aspirations to independence embodied in this text. Therefore, the constitution never came into effect, and instead the Catalan authorities presented the Draft Statute of Catalonia of 1932 to the Spanish Government. This statute (regional constitution), however, was also rejected, and finally the governments of Spain and Catalonia approved the Statute of Catalonia of 1932.

In spite of never having entered into force, the Draft Constitution is a very important text in regards to the political ideas and ideals of the Catalan separatist movement before Francisco Franco's dictatorship.

== Structure of the text ==
The structure of the Draft Constitution of the Catalan Republic is as follows:

- First title: On the Political Administration of Catalonia.
  Article 1
- Second title: Language, Flag and Coat of Arms.
  Articles 1, 2, 3, and 4
- Third title: On the Territory of Catalonia.
  Articles 5, 6, and 7
- Fourth title: The Catalan People.
  Articles 8, 9 and 10
- Fifth title: Individual and Joint Rights.
  Articles 11–48, inclusive
- Sixth title: Obligations of the Citizen.
  It includes the articles number 49, 50, 51 and 52
- Seventh title: On Foreigners.
  It includes the article number 53
- Eighth title: On the Suspension of Rights.
  It includes the articles number 54, 55 and 56
- Ninth title: On the Government of the Republic.
  It includes the articles number 57, 60
- Tenth title: On the Legislative Power.
  It includes the articles between number 61 and 80
- Eleventh title: On the President of the Republic.
  It includes the articles between number 81 and 89
- Twelfth title: On District Councils.
  It includes the articles between number 90 and 96
- Thirteenth title: On The Constituent Assembly.
  It includes the articles between number 97 and 103
- Fourteenth title: On the Revocation of Powers.
  It includes the articles number 104 and 105
- Fifteenth title: On The Municipalities.
  It includes the articles between number 106 and 115
- Sixteenth title: On The Heritage of Catalonia.
  It includes the articles number 116, 117 and 118
- Seventeenth title: On The Army.
  It includes the articles between number 119 and 125
- Eighteenth title: On The Navy.
  It includes the articles number 126 and 127
- Nineteenth title: On The Merchant Marine.
  It includes the articles between number 128 and 131
- Twentieth title: The Council of Ministers.
  It includes the articles between number 132 and 140
- Twenty-first title: On The Judiciary.
  It includes the articles between number 141 and 158
- Twenty-second title: On Legislation in Catalonia.
  It includes the articles number 159 and 60
- Twenty-third title: On The Council of State and National Economy.
  It includes the articles between number 161 and 69
- Twenty-fourth title: On Productive and Constructive Administration.
  It includes the articles between number 170 and 180
- Twenty-fifth title: On The Public Administration.
  It includes the articles between number 181 and 187
- Twenty-sixth title: On The Administration of Education.
  It includes the articles between number 188 and 195
- Twenty-seventh title: On Culture.
  It includes the articles number 196 and 197
- Twenty-eighth title: On Agricultural Policy.
  It includes the article number 198
- Twenty-ninth title: On Industrial and Commercial Administration.
  It includes the article number 199
- Thirtieth title: On The Administration of Public Works.
  It includes the article number 200
- Thirty-first title: On Social Policy.
  It includes the article number 201
- Thirty-second title: On The Administration of the Health Service.
  It includes the article number 202
- Thirty-third title: On The National Debt.
  It includes the article number 203
- Thirty-fourth title: On Confederations.
  It includes the articles between number 204 and 209
- Thirty-fifth title
  It includes the articles number 210 and 211
- Thirty-sixth title: On The Temporary Suspension of the Constitution.
  It includes the article number 212
