= Africanist (Spain) =

Proponents of strong involvement of Spain in Africa

Africanists (Spanish: Africanistas) were the people who encouraged a strong colonial involvement of Spain in Northwest Africa, particularly during the early 20th century. Although Spain had been present in continental Africa for centuries, it was not until the arrival of New Imperialism and the Berlin Conference in 1884 that the colonial power set its interests on African soil. Africanism (Spanish: Africanismo) emerged mainly from the loss of Cuba, the Philippines, Puerto Rico, Guam, and various other islands in 1898 as a consequence of the Spanish–American War. Africanists sought to compensate for these losses by consolidating their possessions in Northwest Africa. Spain's colonization efforts in Africa were smaller when compared to other European colonizers, even after losing their colonies in the Americas and Pacific, because there was a lack of public support to re-establish Spain as an empire. Spain's economy recovered quickly after the loss of their colonies during the Spanish-American War, and the general population lost their fervor for maintaining an empire. Countries like Italy which had started colonizing in the late nineteenth century colonized more than Spain because Italy had much more public support to create an empire.

Within the army, Africanist officers espoused chiefly a conservative worldview with extreme-right views being common. The extreme nationalism and anti-democratic views enabled a potential linkage with fascism. According to Sebastian Balfour, Africanist practices, intertwined with ideas on the "degeneration" of the Spanish masses, would become a core tenet of the ideology of "crusade" present in the 1936 coup d'etat.

== Africanism after Spanish-Moroccan wars ==
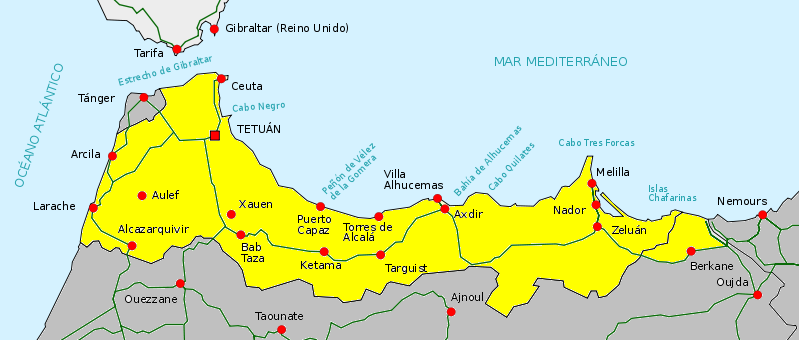
Spanish Morocco

Spain established a protectorate in Morocco in 1912, and the government used the Spanish military to administer its new territory. During Spain's 44-year involvement in Morocco, Africanism evolved into a military mentality found within the army that occupied the Moroccan territories. Much of the army, especially the officer class, developed an interest in Spanish occupation because it was easier for both officers and infantry to get promoted as promotion was based on merit and military accomplishments. Many of the army officers desired a distinguished military career which led to a growth of support of the movement.

== Africanists vs. Junteros ==
There was a growing rivalry within the Spanish military between the soldiers stationed in the Maghreb, the Africanists, and the soldiers stationed on the Iberian Peninsula, the Junteros. Another difference between the two groups was that the Africanists were composed of infantry and cavalry, while the Junteros were composed of artillery units and the majority of the officers in the military. The rivalry began when a conflict of interest arose. After the Spanish-Moroccan wars, the government began to reward the army stationed in Morocco higher pay and quicker promotion. Many Junteros felt envy that they were paid less and lost prestige. The Junteros blocked any support directed to help the soldiers stationed in Africa as an attempt to weaken the Africanists. This rivalry also took different sides in the Spanish Civil War, with Junteros supporting the Republicans, while the Africanists supported the rebels. Francisco Franco was an important figure in the Africanist movement.

== Appeal to Spanish Empire ==
Many Africanists supported the concept of empire due to a sense of nationalism. One of the justifications for Spanish imperialism in Morocco was Hispanidad. This was the idea of racial superiority of the Spanish linguistic-cultural people over those of non-Europeans. The other justification that Africanists used to justify imperialism, specifically in Morocco, was Parentesco. This was the conception that Spaniards and Moroccans (particularly the descendants of Andalusian-Moroccans, and the Riffians) shared ethnic and racial similarities, and thus should be unified.

== Africanists and the public ==
The general Spanish public had no interest in imperialistic actions such as the administration of Spanish Morocco. The public also felt resentment not only toward the Africanists, but the military in its entirety. This was due to the military's role to put down populist revolts. The growing alienation from the Spanish mainland pushed Africanists to adopt many Berber traditions found in Morocco, and they respected the Riffians' military might and bravery.

== Africanists ==
- Alfonso XIII – King of Spain from 1886 to 1931
- Prince Fernando de Baviera – Infante of Spain
- Alfonso de Orleans – Infante of Spain
- Manuel Fernández Silvestre – a Spanish general
- Damaso Berenguer – a Spanish general
- Alfredo Kindelán – founder of the Spanish Air Force
- José Sanjurjo
- Francisco Franco
- Emilio Mola
- José Millán-Astray
- Juan Yagüe
- Emilio Blanco Izaga
- José Marina
- Francisco Gómez Jordana
