= Eduardo González Calleja =

Spanish historian (born 1962)

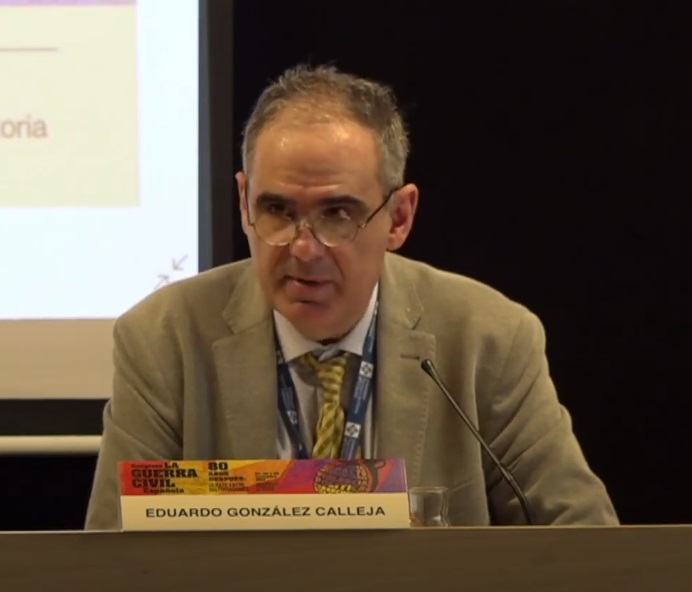
- Born: 1962; Madrid
- Alma mater: Complutense University of Madrid
- Occupation: University teacher
- Employer: Charles III University of Madrid (1998–); Spanish National Research Council (1990–)

Eduardo González Calleja (born 1962) is a Spanish historian, professor of Contemporary History at the Charles III University of Madrid (UC3M). He is the author of a long list of scholarly works dealing with political violence.

== Biography ==
He was born in Madrid in 1962. In 1989, he earned a PhD in Contemporary History at the Complutense University of Madrid, reading a dissertation titled La radicalización de la derecha durante la Segunda República. 1931-1936. Violencia, paramilitarización y fascistización en la crisis española de los años treinta ("the radicalization of the right during the Second Republic. 1931–1936. Violence, paramilitarization and fascistisation"), supervised by Julio Aróstegui. He became a full researcher at the CSIC's Instituto de Historia. A senior lecturer at the Charles III University of Madrid (UC3M) since 2006, he was appointed to a Chair in Contemporary History in 2017.

== Works ==
Author

- La razón de la fuerza. Orden público, subversión y violencia política en la España de la Restauración (1875-1917). Madrid: Consejo Superior de Investigaciones Científicas. 1998.
- El máuser y el sufragio. Orden público, subversión y violencia política en la España de la Restauración (1917-1931). Madrid: Consejo Superior de Investigaciones Científicas. 1999.
- La violencia en la política. Perspectivas teóricas sobre el empleo deliberado de la fuerza en los conflictos de poder. Madrid: Consejo Superior de Investigaciones Científicas. 2002.
- Los golpes de Estado. Madrid: Arco Libros. 2003.
- La España de Primo de Rivera (1923-1930). La modernización autoritaria. Madrid: Alianza. 2006.
- Rebelión en las aulas. Movilización y protesta estudiantil en la España contemporánea, 1865-2008. Madrid: Alianza. 2009.
- Contrarrevolucionarios. Radicalización violenta de las derechas en la Segunda República (1931-1936). Alianza. 2011.
- Nelle Tenebre di Brumaio, quattro secoli di riflessione politica sul colpo di Stato. Società Editrice Dante Alighieri. 2011.
- El laboratorio del miedo. Una historia general del terrorismo, de los sicarios a Al Qa'ida. Barcelona: Crítica. 2013.
- En nombre de la autoridad. La defensa del orden público durante la Segunda República española (1931-1936). Granada: Comares. 2014.
- Cifras cruentas. Las víctimas mortales de la violencia sociopolítica en la Segunda República española (1931-1936). Granada: Comares. 2015.
- Asalto al poder. La violencia política organizada y las ciencias sociales. Madrid: Siglo XXI de España Editores. 2017.
- Guerras no ortodoxas. La 'estrategia de la tensión' y las redes del terrorismo neofascista'. Madrid: Libros de la Catarata. 2018.

Co-author

- González Calleja, Eduardo; Limón Nevado, Fredes (1988). La hispanidad como instrumento de combate: raza e imperio en la prensa franquista durante la guerra civil española. Madrid: Consejo Superior de Investigaciones Científicas.
- Aróstegui, Julio; Canal, Jordi; González Calleja, Eduardo (2003). El carlismo y las guerras carlistas. Hechos, hombres e ideas. Madrid: La Esfera de los Libros.
- González Calleja, Eduardo; Aubert, Paul (2014). Nidos de espías. España, Francia y la Primera Guerra Mundial, 1914-1919. Madrid: Alianza.
- González Calleja, Eduardo; Cobo Romero, Francisco; Martínez Rus, Ana; Sánchez Pérez, Francisco (2015). La Segunda República española. Barcelona: Pasado & Presente.

Editor & Coordinator

- Baby, Sophie; Compagnon, Olivier; González Calleja, Eduardo, eds. (2009). Violencia y transiciones políticas a finales del siglo XX: Europa del Sur-América Latina. Madrid: Casa de Velázquez.
- González Calleja, Eduardo; Navarro Comas, Rocío, eds. (2011). La España del Frente Popular. Política, sociedad, conflicto y cultural en la España de 1936. Granada: Comares.
- Canal, Jordi; González Calleja, Eduardo, eds. (2012). Guerras civiles. Una clave para entender la Europa de los siglos XIX y XX. Madrid: Casa de Velázquez.
- González Calleja, Eduardo, ed. (2017). Anatomía de una crisis. 1917 y los españoles. Madrid: Alianza.
