= Civil directorate of Miguel Primo de Rivera =

Government of Spain (1925–1930)

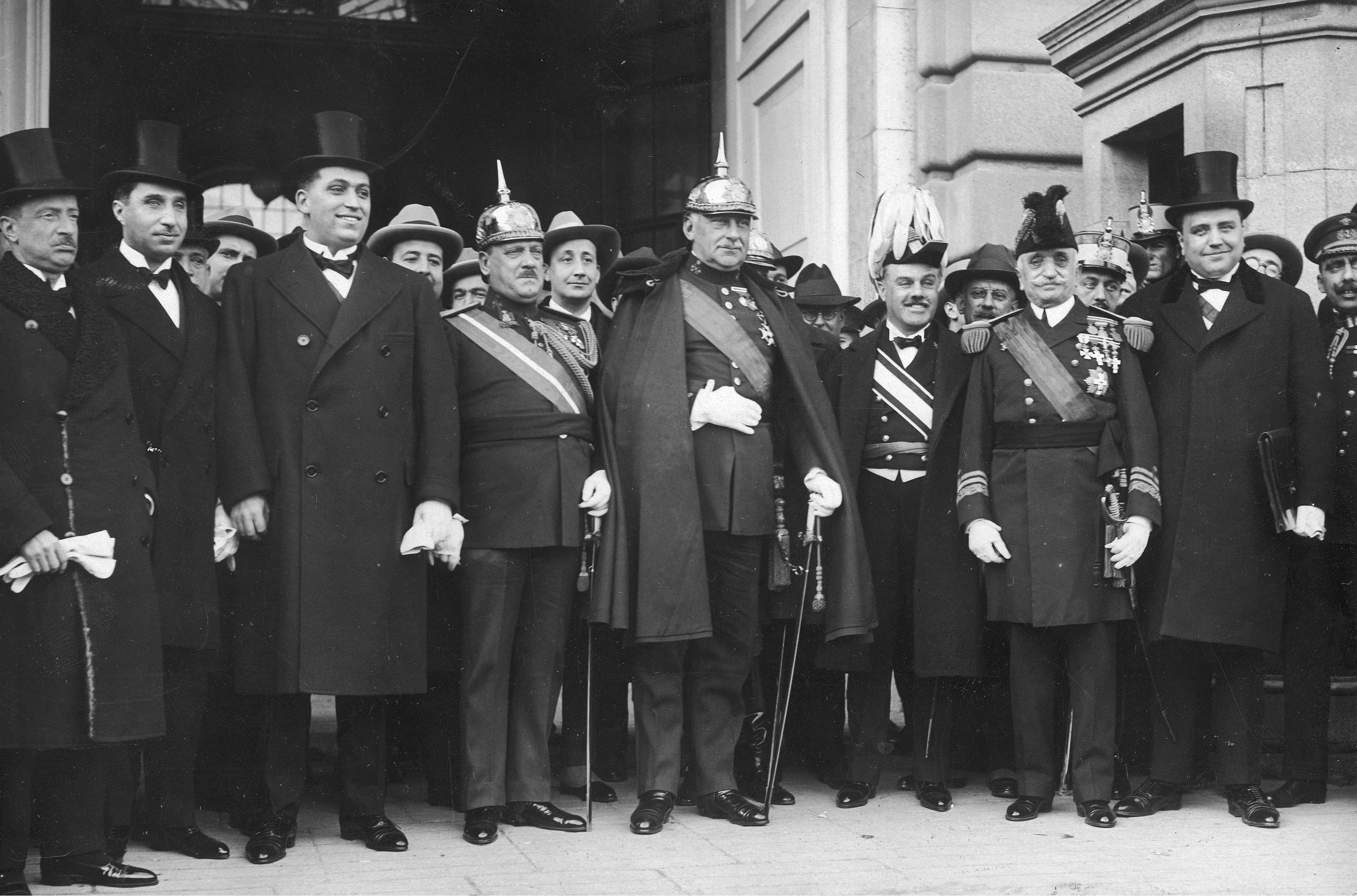
The members of Primo de Rivera's civil directorate in December 1925. In the front row, from left to right, Eduardo Callejo (Public Instruction), José Yanguas (State), José Calvo Sotelo (Treasury), Severiano Martínez Anido (Interior), Miguel Primo de Rivera (President), Count of Guadalhorce (Public Works), Honorio Cornejo (Navy) and Eduardo Aunós (Labor).

The civil directorate of Miguel Primo de Rivera, also referred to as the Civil Directory (Spanish: Directorio Civil), constitutes the second and last period of the dictatorship of Miguel Primo de Rivera in Spain. It was named after the government appointed by Miguel Primo de Rivera in December 1925, which replaced the Military Directory that had held power after the triumph of Primo de Rivera's coup d'état in September 1923. The dictator's purpose was to stabilize his regime "through the creation of a civilian support base". However, the institutionalization project failed and Primo de Rivera presented his resignation to king Alfonso XIII, who had also withdrawn his support, in January 1930, leading to Berenguer's "dictatorship".

== Origin of the directorate ==
According to historian Eduardo Gonzalez Calleja, in January 1924, after the definitive dissolution of the parliament in November 1923, "the idea of a provisional dictatorship of a few months' duration was definitively discarded. In April 1925 Primo was already thinking of the constitution of a new Government when the Moroccan matter was settled.

After the landing of Alhucemas, Primo made the decision to constitute what would be known as the "Civil Directory". As the historian Ángeles Barrio has pointed out, "the popularity that the success of the African campaign had given Primo de Rivera allowed him to take a step forward in the continuity of the regime, to return the Army to the barracks and to undertake a civil phase of the directorate. In fact, on December 3, 1925, Primo de Rivera constituted his first civil government, in which, however, the key posts -Presidency, occupied by himself, Vice-Presidency and Interior, by Severiano Martínez Anido, and War by Juan O'Donnell, Duke of Tetuán- were reserved for military personnel. In the same act of presentation of the government, in order to get out of the way of the speculations, more and more insistent in various sectors about the need for a constitutional solution, Primo de Rivera made public his intention to keep the Constitution in abeyance and not to call elections". The objective set by Primo de Rivera to the new civil directorate was to carry out the economic transformation and the preparation of laws by means of which, after a prudential time, a legal normalcy would be reestablished to guide and govern the future political life of Spain.

With the "Civil Directory", Primo de Rivera reestablished the Council of Ministers with the traditional portfolios and with a composition half civilian and half military. The civilians belonged to the Patriotic Union, and among them stood out "the rising stars of corporate authoritarianism: José Calvo Sotelo [a former "maurista" who in the previous two years had occupied the General Directorate of Local Administration] in Finance, Eduardo Aunós in Labor and the Count of Guadalhorce in Public Works". Another prominent minister was the conservative José Yanguas Messía in the State portfolio. However, in the decisions on strictly political matters Primo de Rivera only discussed them with General Martínez Anido.

According to Genoveva García Queipo de Llano, with the appointment of the civil directorate, Primo de Rivera "affirmed his will to remain in power and did not mark any precise way out of the dictatorial regime".

== Failed institutionalization of the regime ==
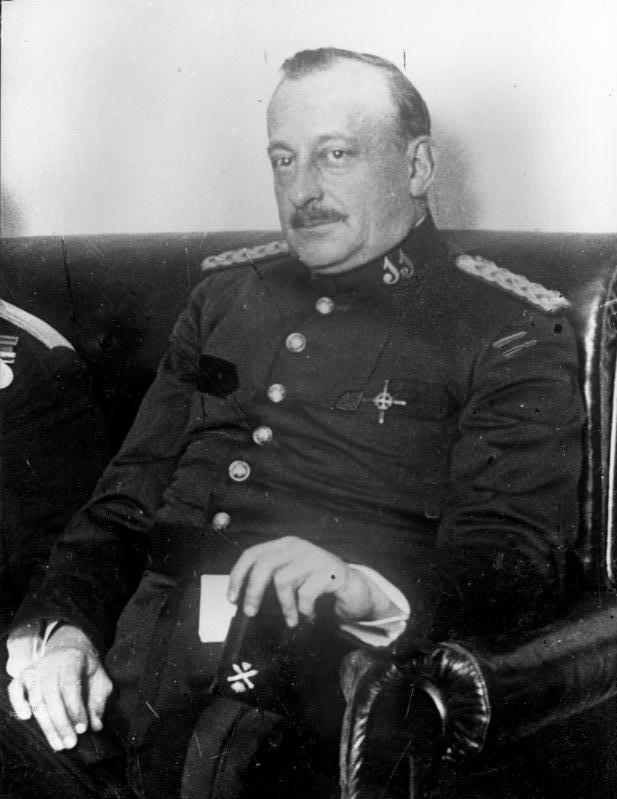
General Miguel Primo de Rivera.

The first step towards the institutionalization of the regime had been the foundation in April 1924 of the "single party" Patriotic Union and the second the formation of the divil directorate itself. The next steps were the establishment of the National Corporate Organization and the convening of the National Consultative Assembly in charge of drafting a new Constitution.

According to González Calleja, "the convening of the National Consultative Assembly in September 1927 and the elaboration of the draft Constitution marked the definitive break of the dictatorship with the parliamentary system, provisionally suspended four years earlier. Since then, the UP rejected the ideals of the 1876 Constitution and opted for the implementation of a corporative system, accentuating its anti-politicism, its anti-parliamentarism, its anti-religionalism and its centralism".

=== National Corporate Organization (OCN) and collaboration of the UGT ===
For González Calleja, the dictatorship tried to follow a middle way between free association unionism and the unique and obligatory unionism of totalitarianisms. For this purpose, Primo de Rivera proposed to abolish the class unions in order to replace them with "unions" with mere welfare, educational and disciplinary functions for their members and to act as intermediaries to elect the workers' representatives in the joint committees of the corporations of the different trades and professions that he proposed to create. Primo de Rivera expressed it clearly a few days after the coup d'état was consummated: "Workers' associations, indeed, for purposes of culture, protection and mutualism, and even of healthy politics, but not for resistance and struggle with production".

The culmination of this process took place in November 1926 with the creation of the National Corporate Organization, whose ultimate goal, according to historian Ángeles Barrio, was to guarantee social peace through a policy of intervention in the world of labor ("social corporativism"). The OCN consisted of a first tier formed by joint committees; a second tier constituted by the provincial Mixed Commissions and, finally, a third tier, formed by the corporation councils of each trade, which constituted the highest body. The representation of employers and workers was equal -parity- in each step. The key piece of the OCN were the local Joint Committees whose primary purpose was "to regulate the life of the corresponding profession or group of professionals".

Primo de Rivera offered the representation of the working class in the OCN to the socialist union, the Unión General de Trabajadores (UGT), which caused a deep division between those in favor of collaborating with the dictatorship, headed by Francisco Largo Caballero, and those against, whose leader was Indalecio Prieto. The former won and the UGT joined the OCN, justifying this with the argument that it did not restrict the right to strike and that it considered the form of election of workers' representatives in the Joint Committees to be democratic. In the OCN, the socialist union occupied around 60% of the workers' representation in the Joint Committees and an even higher percentage in the two upper echelons. However, the increase in UGT membership was only 10%, from 211,000 in 1924 to 235,000 in 1928 -the PSOE went from 8,000 members in 1924 to nearly 13,000 in 1929-.

The system of the Joint Committees considerably reduced labor conflicts, but in the last two years of the dictatorship, as the economic situation worsened, strikes reappeared. The regime's response was to resort to repression, from which the UGT was not spared, as the Government closed 93 of its centers.

For their part, the employers -and the Free Trade Unions- from 1928 onwards began to criticize the OCN as "stateist" and "centralist". By the end of the year, the employers' organizations were already openly against it and called for the dissolution of the Joint Committees or at least their reform so that they would be limited to conciliation and arbitration tasks, and would no longer legislate on labor relations and working conditions. This was how the OCN lost "definitively the support of the conservative classes, who saw in primorriverist paternalism a direct threat to their interests," states Eduardo González Calleja.

=== Patriotic Union ===
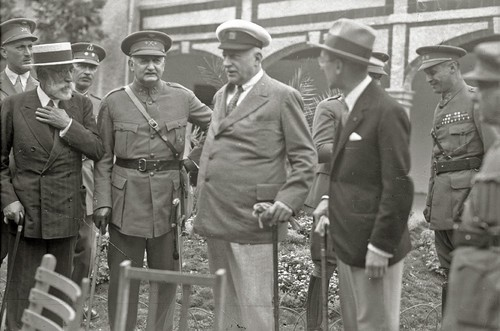
General Miguel Primo de Rivera, in the center dressed in civilian clothes with a sailor's cap, in San Sebastian in 1927.

At the beginning of July 1926 the National Assembly of Patriotic Unions was held in Madrid, where the statutes of the party were approved and the members of the organs of the party, which since its birth in 1924 had not yet been endowed with a structure that went beyond the provincial level, were elected. Primo de Rivera was ratified as National Chief and a National Board of Directors was appointed, and a National Board of Directors, "imitation of the Grand Council of Fascism" according to Eduardo Gonzalez Calleja, composed of the president, the vice president, the secretary general, the 50 provincial chiefs of the UP and 21 people appointed directly by Primo de Rivera. But the truth was that after the Assembly this body only met once, in October 1927. At the provincial and local levels, the same structure was reproduced with a provincial or local Chief, with his corresponding advisory board, half of whose members were elected by him, but in reality those who supervised the provincial organization of the UP continued to be the civil governors who controlled the appointment of the provincial Chief and the local Chiefs.

A few months later, in February 1927, Primo de Rivera ordered the civil governors, a third of whom were members of the UP, to appoint upetists to the positions in the city councils and in the deputations -in October 1928 it was established that they would constitute four fifths-, which was viewed with distrust by some of the most prominent members of the civil directorate such as José Calvo Sotelo and Eduardo Aunós. The latter denounced that "an infinity of elements" of the parties of the turn evicted from power "ran to enlist in the victor's army, because the only thing that interested them was to be always on the rise".

As for the number of affiliates, the maximum was reached in July 1927 with 1,319,428, according to official figures, and from that date on it dropped to between 600,000 and 700,000 by the end of 1929. According to González Calleja, a revealing fact of the "lukewarm reception that the primorriverist mobilizing project had among the Spanish population" was the modest circulation of the UP and the regime's newspaper La Nación (50,000 copies in 1927).

The UP became a mere propaganda instrument of the regime, always ready to obey the orders of its National Chief -such as the multitudinous demonstration held in Madrid on September 13, 1928, in its support-. In February 1929 Primo de Rivera also turned it into a parapolice organization in defense of the regime by attributing to it functions of investigation and information in collaboration with the Somatén, constituting both organizations a sort of "patriotic league". When the draft Constitution presented in July 1929 was rejected, the UP organized a campaign throughout Spain in its defense, which included attacks on the Constitution of 1876, and whose most outstanding act was the great rally held at the Monumental cinema in Madrid in mid-September 1929.

=== Mobilization and framing of the masses ===
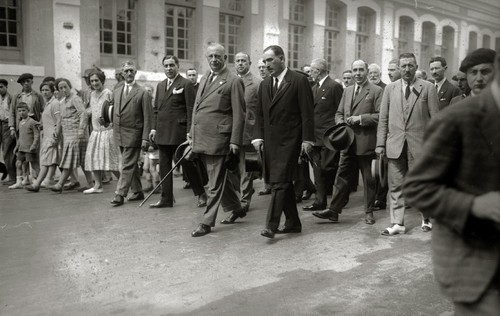
General Miguel Primo de Rivera in civilian clothes walking the streets of Rentería in 1928.

As Eduardo González Calleja has pointed out, "the dictatorship inaugurated in Spain the mass propagandistic practices typical of interwar Europe", articulating what "was close to being the first great integral program of mass nationalization in the contemporary history of Spain", since the regime "understood from the first moment that the manipulation or channeling of the demands of these masses [who were then entering political life] was a fundamental task for its own survival". But this mobilization was far from adopting the mass rituals of fascism because in it traditional institutions such as the Church and the Army were always present and traditional values were exalted, fundamentally religious ones, although a certain "semi-totalitarian obsession" was not absent, as González Calleja describes it, "for the creation of a new man, industrious, with an impeccable life, gentlemanly and healthy, like the one the regime tried to forge through the pedagogy deployed in the barracks, the church or the school, or with its civic and pre-military education program". On the other hand, according to this same historian, "the influence that this attempt at patriotic mobilization exerted on the nationalist rituals that, with the aroma of incense and barracks, the Franco dictatorship elaborated less than a decade later should not be underestimated".

The mobilization of the masses took the form of large "patriotic" demonstrations of adhesion or atonement to the dictator organized by the Patriotic Union (UP) in collaboration with the State apparatus, such as the rally in Madrid of provincial leaders of the UP and mayors from all over the country which was organized in 1924 in response to the publication by Vicente Blasco Ibáñez of his book denouncing the dictatorship and the Monarchy entitled Alfonso XIII unmasked, which was accompanied by the delivery to Primo de Rivera of an album with more than three and a half million signatures of support and the distribution of half a million medals in homage to the King.

Probably the most important "patriotic" demonstration was the one held on September 13, 1928, the fifth anniversary of the coup d'état that brought Primo de Rivera to power. The dictator communicated in a circular addressed to the Patriotic Unions that the purpose of the great demonstration in Madrid was "to demonstrate what UP is, and they will compare the embarrassing picture of the old regime with the one offered by the current one, so satisfactory in so many ways". It was preceded by parades in front of the City Halls on September 8 and demonstrations in the provincial capitals on the following day, "to be attended by representatives of all the local committees, preceded or followed by an act of patriotic affirmation", in addition to the celebration of various cultural, folkloric and propagandistic acts "of admiration, gratitude and enthusiastic adhesion to the Savior of Spain". On the morning of September 13, representative groups of the provinces paraded in alphabetical order, dressed in their typical costumes and accompanied by music bands —including a group of 46 Andalusian horsemen with "beautiful girls mounted on their backs"— in front of the tribune located in the recently inaugurated building of the Ministry of Public Instruction on Alcalá Street in Madrid, and which was presided over by Primo de Rivera, accompanied by the ambassadors of Italy and Portugal. This was followed by a large rally in the Plaza de Oriente, overflown by airplanes and attended by some 100,000 people, and in the afternoon a bullfight was held in the newly built Plaza Monumental.

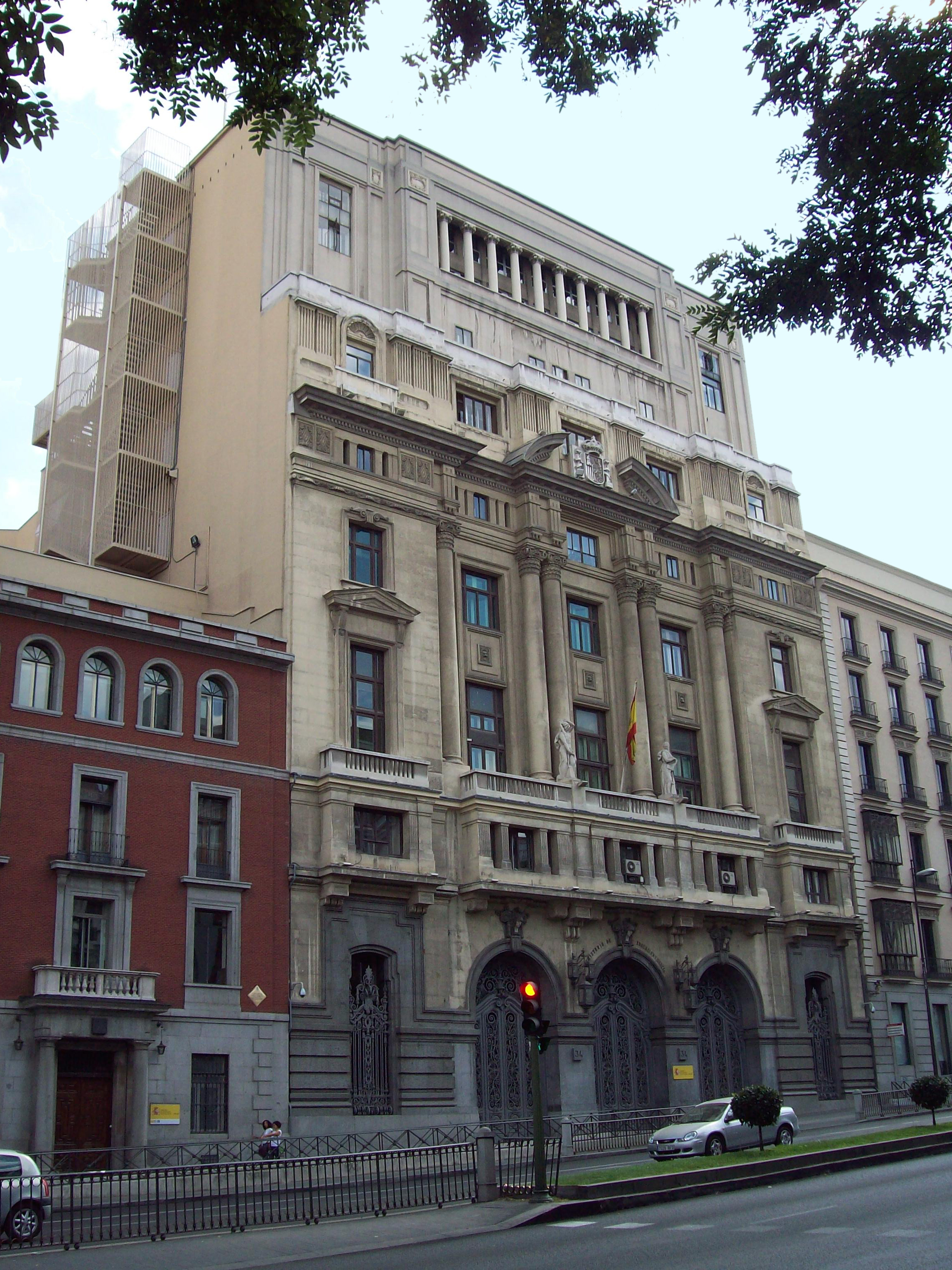
Facade of the building of the Ministry of Public Instruction and Fine Arts of Spain, recently inaugurated, where the tribune that presided over the "patriotic" demonstration of September 13, 1928 was installed.

Another of the instruments used for the indoctrination of the masses were the "patriotic" ceremonies organized by the government delegates, all of them military, on the occasion of "the Fiesta de la Raza, the homage to the troops of Africa, the swearing in of the flag of the recruits, the blessing of the Somatén flag or the Arbor Day" and the "patriotic" conferences, also organized by the government delegates, in which "the virtues and traditions of the Hispanic race, the duty to defend the homeland, the veneration of the Head of State, respect for authority, love of nature and the obligation to pay taxes" were promoted, says Eduardo González Calleja. These conferences were officially instituted in January 1926 and were to be held on Sundays - like the later Italian Fascist raduni domenicali - in the chapter halls of the town halls, one of the purposes of which was to "sow moral and patriotic ideas in the humble intelligences" of the peasants. For the indoctrination of children in schools, the Catechism of the Citizen was published, written by Captain Teodoro de Iradier, founder of the Exploradores de España, which aimed to complement the improvement of the race with "the patriotic and practical education of our youth, education that transforms their habits and customs, education that gives the new generations moral and physical energies, acquired to such a degree, that makes them the future regenerators of our Homeland". The book was sent to all schools together with the Gymnastics Booklet.

For the military indoctrination of young people before military service, the National Service of Physical, Civic and Pre-military Education (in Spanish: Servicio Nacional de Educación Física, Ciudadana y Premilitar, SNEFCP) was created in January 1929. Its ultimate goal, according to Eduardo González Calleja, was to "militarize civil society" by creating a "new citizen" who would be governed by military values. Another of its objectives was to "improve the race". The SNEFCP was in charge of "the teaching of civic duties and pre-military and gymnastic instruction of young people" from the age of 19. The Service would be organized by judicial districts and an Army commander would be appointed to head them, assisted by a sergeant, who would be in charge of directing the pre-military instruction and education programs and of giving patriotic lectures on political topics.

Physical education, in charge of the assistant sergeant, would be carried out in accordance with the Army Gymnastics Regulations, complemented by the practice of games and sports. As for military training, it would focus on the use of the terrain for combat and the practice of close-range shooting —those who passed the aptitude tests would enjoy certain privileges when they completed their compulsory military service— for "moral education", its objective was to develop in young people "the exaltation of love for the homeland" and "everything that tends to make them proud of being Spanish".

The civil governments and town halls were instructed to provide premises, shooting ranges and gymnasiums to the SNEFCP and to advertise it. But many mayors responded that they lacked funds to meet the request, and the dictatorship was forced to change the initial project. The military chiefs became "inspectors" of the teachers who were in charge of physical education and pre-military education. The activities of the SNEFCP ceased in January 1931, one year after the fall of the dictatorship of Miguel Primo de Rivera, and the Second Spanish Republic suppressed it.

=== National Consultative Assembly ===
On September 4, 1926, the leaders of the Patriotic Union made public a communiqué requesting that a plebiscite be held to coincide with "the third anniversary of the glorious coup d'état" in which an opportunity would be given "for opinion to express whether it is convenient to organize a Supreme National Assembly to assist in the governance of the State".

Sonnet written in exile by Miguel de Unamuno dedicated to Primo Rivera on the occasion of his appointment in 1926 as doctor honoris causa by the University of Salamanca, from whom the dictator had deprived him of his position as rector.

It does not move, Miguel, to admire you,
the way you have achieved power,
nor do I admire that parody of a party,
that you now try to protect yourself with.
Nor do I admire your skill or art,
gagging a numb town,
nor do I admire the assembly you have concocted,
so that it will always have to endure you.
Admire you, Miguel, in a way
so fervent, so mystical and sincere,
that you can have neither truce nor pause
for the distinguished audacity and the freshness
to accept the honoris causa biretta,
without cause, honor or culture.

The consultation was held between September 11 and 13 without any guarantee, since the tables were full of members of the Patriotic Union and the men and women over 18 years of age who participated did not vote, but signed minutes in support of the Dictator. Slightly more than half of the census (7,478,502 out of 13,110,897) took part.

On the same day, September 13, 1926, Primo de Rivera made public a manifesto wherein he spoke of the establishment of a parliament whose main mission was "to prepare and present in stages to the Government, within a period of three years, and as a preliminary draft, a general and complete legislation which at the appropriate time must be submitted to a sincere contrast of public opinion, and in the appropriate part, to the royal sanction". From the general legislation he highlighted a "draft of constituent laws".

According to Genoveva García Queipo de Llano, with the realization of the informal plebiscite Primo de Rivera intended to demonstrate that he had popular support and thus pressure the King to accept his proposal to convene a Consultative Assembly, which was not elected. For a year Alfonso XIII resisted, but in September 1927, he signed the convocation of the National Consultative Assembly.

In the Royal Decree-Law of September 12, 1927, it was stated that "it was not to be a Parliament, it would not legislate, it would not share sovereignty", but a "body of information, controversy and advice of a general nature that would collaborate with the Government". It was "a corporative assembly, completely dependent on the executive power", "with members elected by the city councils, the provincial deputations, the patriotic unions, the State bodies and outstanding representatives of the Administration, the army, justice or the Church together with other representatives of labor, commerce, culture, arts and other activities by the government, and it was intended to be the expression of a tripartite model of representation —Administration, Society and Party— which had its roots in classical corporativism and in Italian fascist corporativism".

The refusal of the Socialists to participate in the Assembly was a setback for Primo de Rivera's project. Nor did the Universities, increasingly at odds with the regime, send representatives. According to González Calleja, the constitution of the ANC "destroyed the image of the dictatorship as a provisional regime, and opened the way to the constitution of an authoritarian regime of a clearly liquidationist character, which went from being a temporary state of exception to becoming a conscious enterprise of liquidation of the liberal-parliamentary regime".

The internal rules of procedure guaranteed a tight control of the Assembly by the government, since it was the latter, through the Bureau of the Assembly, which set the agenda of the commissions and assigned them the topics for debate. When a committee agreed on an opinion, the president of the Assembly sent it to the government, that decided whether it should be discussed in the Plenary, since the number of sessions was limited to four per month, and whether it should be voted on in the Plenary —although, in spite of this, certain relevant issues were dealt with, such as the draft of the new Penal Code or the reform of university studies—. Furthermore, the Assembly did not exercise the function of control of the government, and the few criticisms that were made did not reach the public opinion because the strict press censorship of the parliamentary reviews prevented it.

=== 1929 Draft Constitution ===
In the debates of the First Section in charge of drafting the preliminary draft of the Constitution, a clear division soon became evident between those who, like Juan de la Cierva, defended the maintenance of part of the Constitution of 1876 and the radical rightists who, like Ramiro de Maeztu, understood that "the constitutional reform must also extend to the matter of these rights, proceeding to their curtailment", and therefore defended the drafting of a completely new Constitution. Among the supporters of this second option were José María Pemán, considered one of the main ideologists of the dictatorship, and the Maurists, headed by Gabriel Maura Gamazo and Antonio Goicoechea.

Primo de Rivera also expressed his support for the elaboration of a new Constitution —without taking into account the Constitution of 1876— that should be based on a principle borrowed from fascism, the "sovereignty of the State", as opposed to the liberal principle of national sovereignty and the liberal-conservative principle of sovereignty shared between the King and the Courts. It also presented the Army as the "arm of the State", thus placing it above the Courts, with only one Chamber and elected by corporate suffrage. The Patriotic Union would be the only party of the new regime.

In the First Section, the position of the Maurists, supported by Primo de Rivera, prevailed and a completely new draft of the Constitution was drawn up. The final draft was made public on July 5, 1929.

The reputed jurist Mariano Gómez called it a charter granted and stressed that it broke completely with the history of Spanish constitutionalism. Conservatives, liberals, republicans and socialists rejected it outright and it was also criticized by the National Consultative Assembly.

In reality, the project did not satisfy anyone, not even Primo de Rivera, because of the broad powers granted to the Council of the Kingdom and, above all, to the King, to the detriment of the Government and its president. On September 13, 1929, the sixth anniversary of the coup d'état, Primo de Rivera made public his reservations about the draft Constitution, highlighting its "imbalance of powers" in favor of the Crown.

Thus, a few months after its presentation, the preliminary draft was completely stalled, so that the political debate was already focused on the opening of a true "constituent period". As Genoveva García Queipo de Llano has pointed out, "what ended up ruining the dictatorship as a political formula was its own inability to find an institutional formula different from that of the past". A point of view that is shared by González Calleja: "The rapid failure of the preliminary draft left the Government in a dead end. This, together with the accumulation of political problems and the financial crisis, precipitated the collapse of the regime".

== Policies implemented by directorate ==
=== Educational policy ===
The civil directorate continued with the educational policy initiated by the military directorate that, following the "regenerationist" principles, had two objectives: to reduce the high rate of illiteracy and to "nationalize the school". As for the first objective, the success of the dictatorship was undeniable, since the illiteracy rate was reduced ten points, from 52.35% in 1920 to 42.33% in 1930. This was possible due to the increase in the budget of the Ministry of Public Instruction —which between 1924 and 1930 stood at 5.74% of the General State Budget, although still far from the 11.93% allocated to the Ministry of War or the 8.38% corresponding to expenditures in Morocco—. This allowed for the construction of 8,000 new schools which welcomed 300,000 new pupils, and to increase the number of primary school teachers from 28,924 in 1923 to 34,680 in 1930, although their salaries continued to be very low (between 2,500 and 3,000 pesetas per year).

As for the second objective, "nationalizing the school", decrees and orders were issued to ensure the teaching of Castilian and in Castilian and of the Catholic religion. On June 11, 1926, a Royal Decree again insisted that "teachers who prescribe, abandon or hinder the teaching in their schools of the official language in those regions where they conserve another native language, will be subjected to proceedings, and may be subject to suspension of employment and salary from one to three months". If they reiterated, they could be transferred to "another province where only the official language is spoken" and the public or private schools could be "closed temporarily or definitively". On the other hand, in 1927, mass attendance was made compulsory for teachers and students.

Regarding secondary education, the dictatorship continued to leave it in the hands of the religious schools and did not undertake any plan for the construction of public high schools. In August 1926, the Minister of Public Instruction, the Catholic Eduardo Callejo de la Cuesta, launched the reform of the Bachillerato, whose main novelties were the greater weight of technical-scientific education and the subject of Spanish History, and the obligatory teaching of Religion. The number of students increased by 20%, due to the economic improvement of middle-class families.

The number of university students experienced a spectacular growth since it doubled between 1923 and 1930, from 27,000 to almost 60,000, a third was studying at the Central University of Madrid —where in June 1929 the works of the new University City began—. On May 19, 1928, the Gaceta de Madrid published the Royal Decree-Law reforming University Studies. The "Callejo reform" included an article, number 53, which recognized the degrees issued by the two private centers of higher studies then existing in Spain, both owned by the Church —the Augustinians of El Escorial and the Jesuits of Deusto—, unleashing a wave of protests from university students, which was not appeased when Primo de Rivera repealed the article, but continued until the fall of the dictatorship, in January 1930, and of the Monarchy, in April 1931.

=== Religious policy ===
The policy of the dictatorship was to strengthen the moral tutelage of the Catholic Church over society, for which it supported the self-denominated League against Immorality and the National League for the Defense of the Clergy. In mid 1927, Citizen Boards were established to develop moralization campaigns aimed at the repression of blasphemy, alcoholism and prostitution, as well as the promotion of Sunday rest, among other functions. As Eduardo González Calleja has pointed out, "the prohibition of some Carnival celebrations, the collection of anti-religious publications, the circulars against the profanation of holidays and the immorality of customs created an atmosphere of hypocritical puritanism, in which the patriotic, Catholic and uncompromisingly moralistic good citizen defended a pactful version of Catholicism, fearful of social change, retrograde and conformist", constituting, as Shlomo Ben Ami has noted, an antecedent of the national-Catholicism of Franco's dictatorship. "The stigma of collaborationism with the dictatorship had dire consequences for the Church during the process of regime change."

The only conflict Primo de Rivera had with the Catholic Church was the opposition of the Catalan bishops, led by the archbishop of Tarragona, Francesc Vidal i Barraquer, and by the bishop of Barcelona Josep Miralles, to order the parish priests to preach in Spanish. Thus, Primo de Rivera's decision "to suppress the use of the Catalan language, even in the liturgy, soon turned the Catalan clergy —as was to happen with the Basque clergy and the Catalan Church under Franco— into the champion of regional liberties and cultural autonomy.

=== Foreign policy ===
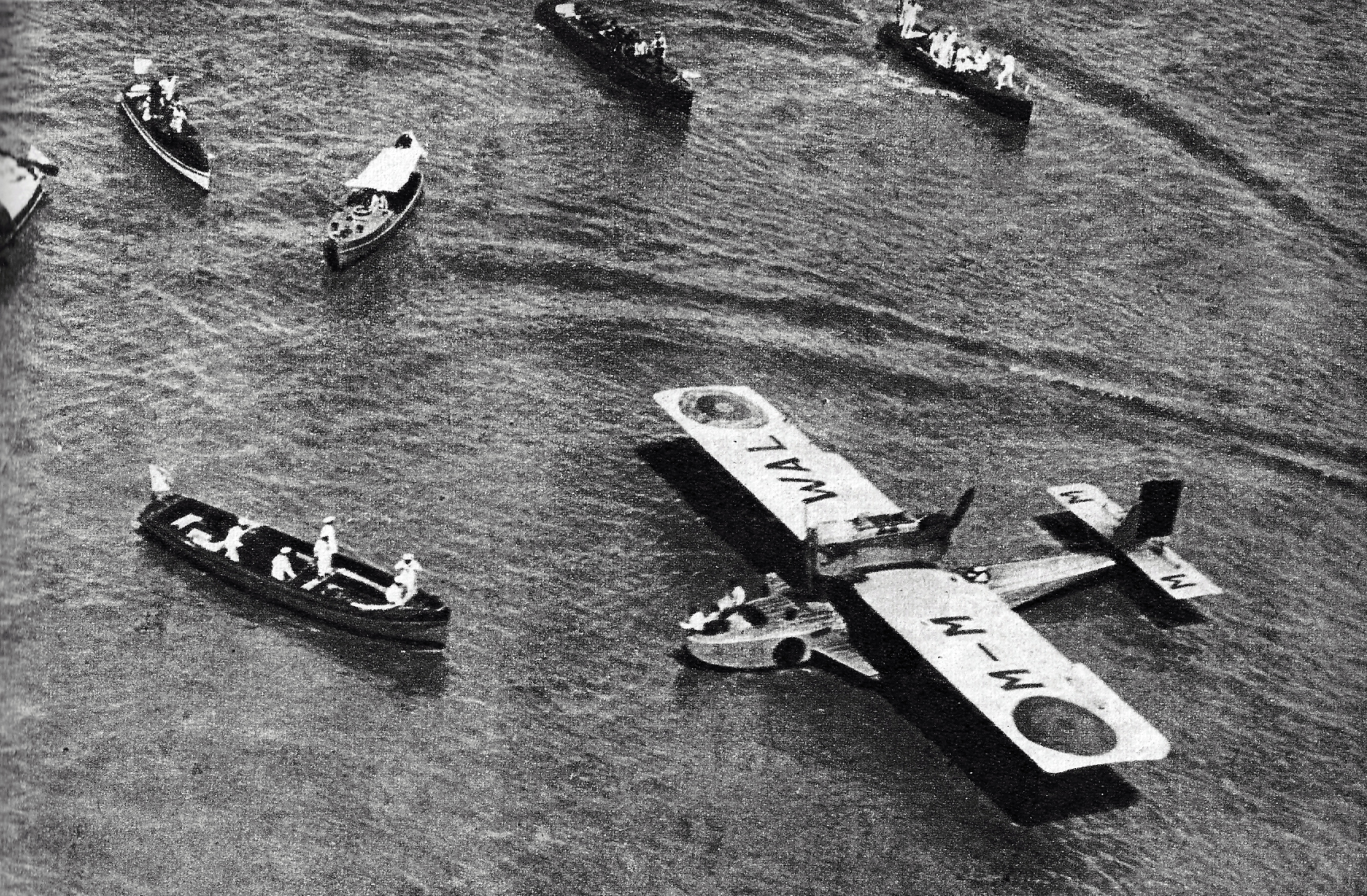
Landing of the Plus Ultra in the Río de la Plata, in front of Buenos Aires (January 1926).

The success in the pacification of Morocco after the landing of Al Hoceima prompted a more "aggressive" foreign policy. Primo de Rivera demanded that Spain should have a permanent seat on the Council of the League of Nations and that Tangier, a Moroccan city with a large Spanish community or of Spanish origin, should be integrated into the Spanish Protectorate of Morocco. In this second initiative he had the initial support of Mussolini, which raised the suspicions of France and Great Britain, guarantors, together with Spain, of Tangier's international status, and, on the other hand, brought about a rapprochement between Fascist Italy and Spain, which resulted in the signing on August 7, 1926, of a treaty of friendship between the two countries.

Since its foundation, Spain had been a member of the Council of the League of Nations (SoN) by being elected by the Assembly each time the non-permanent members had to be renewed, so the claim to a permanent seat was more a matter of prestige. On March 2, 1926, Primo de Rivera sent José Yanguas Messía to Geneva to explain before the SoN Assembly the reasons for the Spanish aspiration, but he did not achieve his goal. Then, in order to force the SoN to accept the proposal, Primo de Rivera reopened the question of Tangier and on August 25, 1926, he requested its incorporation into the Spanish Protectorate of Morocco. The offer made to him by France and Great Britain was to make Spain a de facto permanent member of the Council under the commitment that it would be re-elected indefinitely to the non-permanent seats on the council. But Primo de Rivera rejected the offer and threatened to leave the SoN, since on September 4 Germany, the great loser in the Great War, had been admitted as a permanent member of the council. However, the dictator did not carry out his threat and in March 1928 Spain returned to its activities in the SoN, being re-elected to the council for three more years on September 10, 1929. The only thing Primo de Rivera achieved was that the Council of the League of Nations met in Madrid on June 6, 1929, and that Spain participated in the administration of Tangier —it was assigned the appointment of the chief of police— but its international status was maintained.

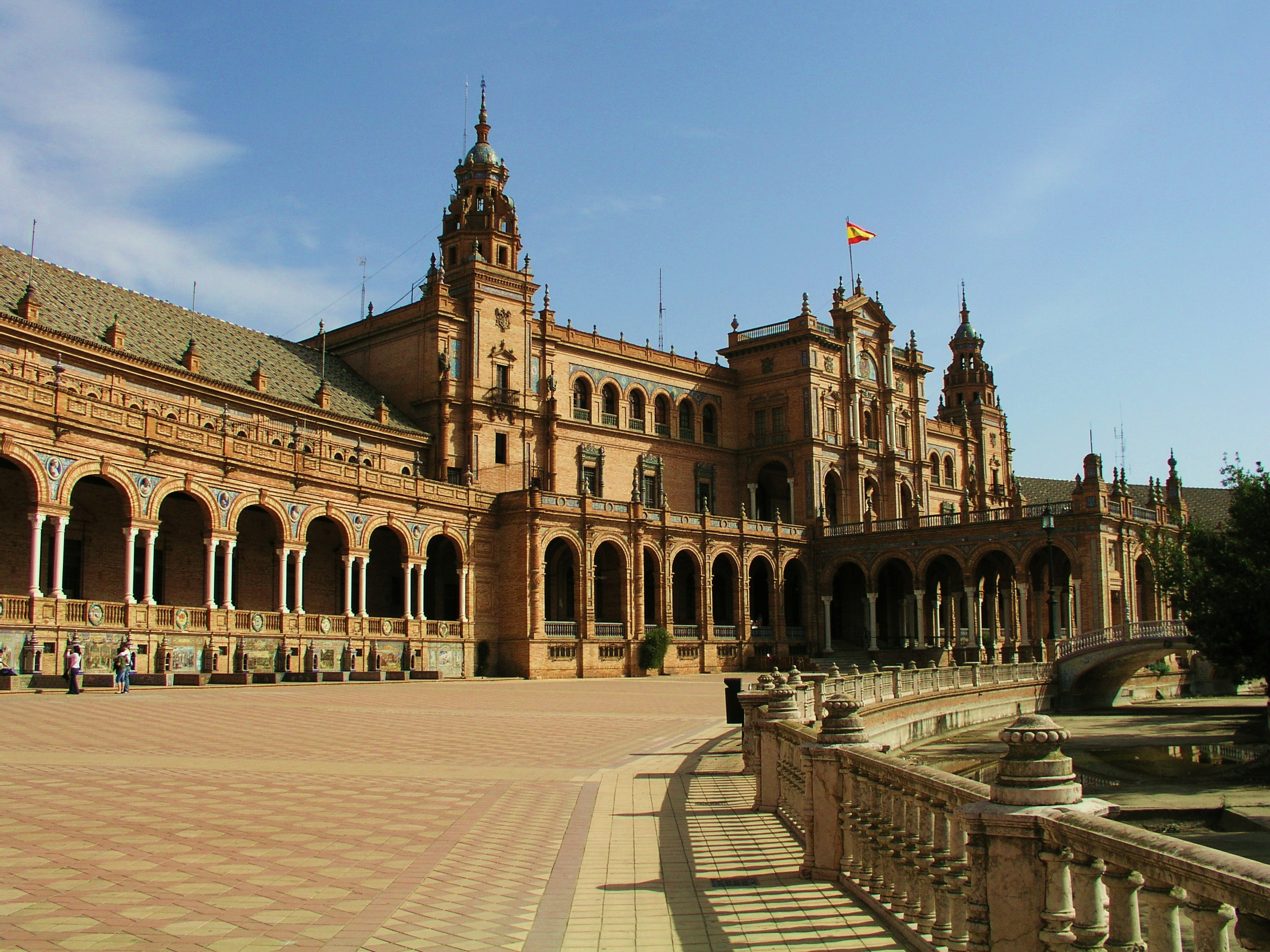
Plaza de España at the 1929 Ibero-American Exposition in Seville.

These failures led Primo de Rivera to reorient his foreign policy towards Portugal —a relationship that was favored by the triumph in 1926 of a military coup d'état that installed a regime similar to that of the primorriverist dictatorship— and towards Latin America, a term that began to consolidate then. Thus, the dictatorship sponsored the trip of the Plus Ultra, a seaplane piloted by Commander Ramón Franco that left Palos de la Frontera on January 22, 1926, and arrived in Buenos Aires two days later, after a stopover in the Canary Islands and Cape Verde. The Ibero-American Exposition of Seville, inaugurated on May 9, 1929, had a similar objective to strengthen the ties between the "mother country" and the American republics. Other examples of this pan-Hispanic policy were the inauguration of the Cervantes Monument in Madrid's Plaza de España and the restoration of the mausoleum of the Catholic Monarchs in the Royal Chapel of Granada.

The intention to improve relations with the American republics that were former Spanish colonies had already been expressed by Primo de Rivera shortly after the coup d'état, when on October 12, 1923, he declared his commitment to "increase and consolidate the flows of love between Spain and America" and that it would be based on "considering the Americans as our brothers, aspiring that they grant us the same title". According to Eduardo González Calleja, "in practice, Primo identified himself with the conservative movement of Spanish-Americanism linked to the fin-de-siècle regenerationism: the conservative pan-Hispanism that maintained Catholicism as the basic essence of Spanish-American relations, so that priority was given to spiritual and cultural relations over economic and political ones".

González Calleja concludes: "In reality, the rapprochement with the American subcontinent fulfilled for the dictatorship the double function of consoling public opinion of the troubles of Morocco and diverting the attention of a muzzled press".

=== Economic policy ===
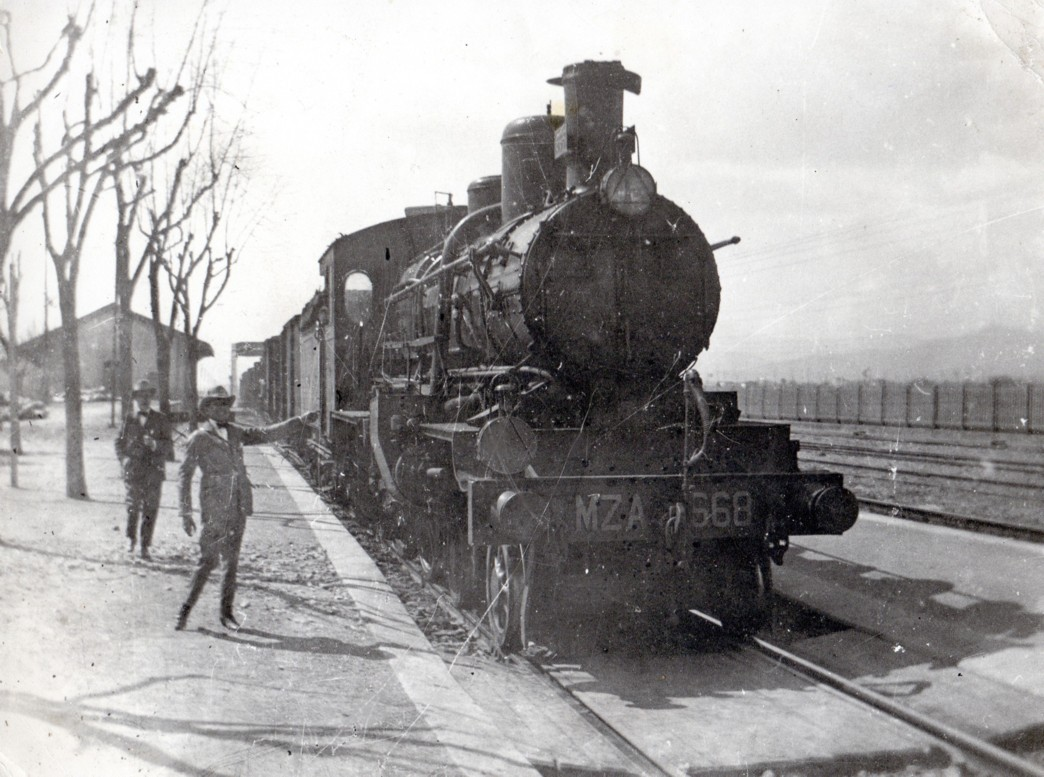
The MZA locomotive, one of the most powerful of its time. The expansion and modernization of the Spanish Communications Network was one of the trump cards of the primorriverist dictatorship.

The dictatorship focused its propaganda on economic achievements, but the truth is that the favorable international situation (the "Roaring Twenties") had a lot to do with the remarkable economic growth that took place in those years. His economic policy was based on a greater intervention of the State, through organisms such as the Council of National Economy created in 1924 (without whose permission, for example, no new industry could be installed), and on the protectionism of "national production". Two important achievements were the creation in June 1927 of CAMPSA, the Compañía Arrendataria del Monopolio de Petróleos, and the Compañía Telefónica Nacional de España, with majority capital from the North American ITT. But the interventionist economic policy of the dictatorship was most evident in public works, from hydraulic works —for whose integral use (energy, irrigation and transport) the Confederaciones Hidrográficas were created— to roads (in 1926 the Circuito Nacional de Firmes Especiales was founded, which built some 7,000 kilometers of roads) and railroads. Electricity was also brought to the rural world. In reality, according to Ángeles Barrio, "extreme economic nationalism, interventionism and fear of competition were already traditional maxims of economic policy in Spain, and Primo de Rivera only made them develop and reach their maximum expression during the years of the dictatorship".

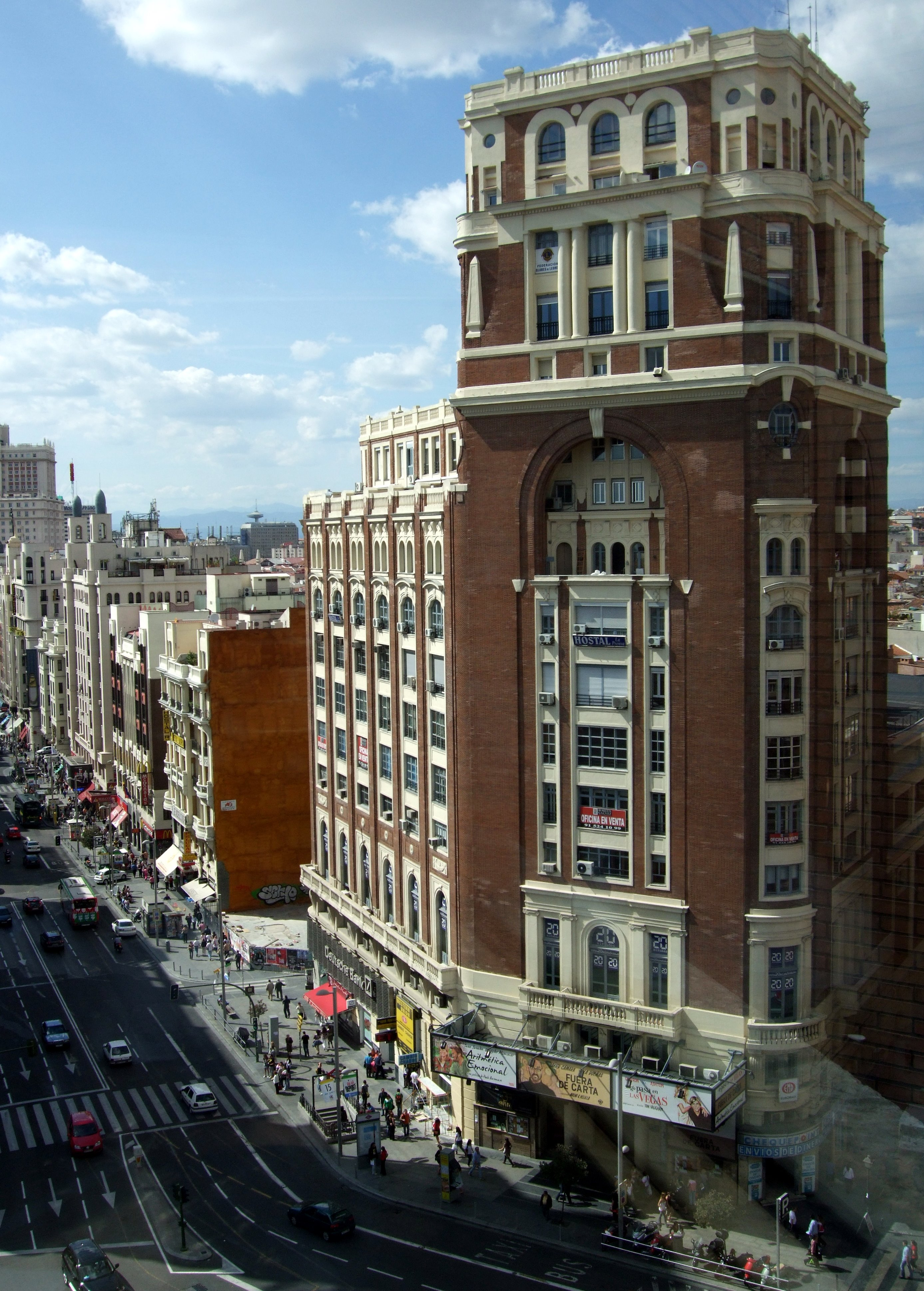
Palacio de la Prensa building on Madrid's Gran Vía, inaugurated in 1929.

In order to finance the considerable increase in public spending that the interventionist economic policy of the dictatorship entailed, no fiscal reform was implemented to increase income, so it was necessary to resort to the issuance of debt, which led to heavy foreign and domestic indebtedness, endangering the stability of the peseta.

One of the key points of the dictatorship's propaganda had been that it had managed to reestablish the value of the peseta —the "depreciation of the currency" had been one of the reasons given to justify the coup d'état—. When Primo de Rivera came to power, the exchange rate of the dollar was 7.50 pesetas, and in the following years the Spanish currency was revalued against both the dollar and the pound sterling. In 1927 the dollar exchange rate was 5.18 pesetas. The problem was that the revaluation of the peseta was largely artificial, since it was mainly due to the speculative movements of foreign capital attracted by the high interest rates and the rising prospects of the currency. This, on the other hand, alerted the exporting sectors led by the Catalan industrialists, who protested against the rise of the peseta, which made foreign sales more difficult. Francesc Cambó accused the government of encouraging speculation on the currency.

In 1928 the speculative movement changed its sign —foreign capital began to leave the country— and a progressive depreciation of the peseta began, fed by the doubts about the continuity of the regime and by the high State budget deficit, which in 1928 exceeded 1000 million pesetas —the public works program which had been another of the achievements highlighted by the propaganda of the dictatorship was being financed by the issuing of public debt, since the State income had not increased as no fiscal reform of any kind had been implemented—. The response of the Minister of Finance, José Calvo Sotelo, to the devaluation was to establish in June 1928 the Foreign Exchange Intervention Committee, which had a fund of 500 million pesetas to intervene in the London market through a banking syndicate to support the parity of the peseta. But it was soon proven that the measure was insufficient —Calvo Sotelo even blamed the "enemies" of the regime for the loss of value of the peseta—. The next measure was agreed in December 1928 —a half-point increase in interest rates— which did not work, nor did the attempt to restrict imports to reduce the balance of trade deficit.

In October 1929 the foreign exchange intervention policy was suspended. The 500 million pesetas of the CIC had been spent and had been of no use because the peseta's exchange rate against the dollar and the pound had continued to fall. The following month it was decided to tackle one of the fundamental problems, the high fiscal deficit, and the Extraordinary Budget, the accounting artifice which Calvo Sotelo had devised to increase public expenditure without increasing the deficit, was put to an end, but Calvo Sotelo still refused to devalue the peseta, because he considered it an "unpatriotic" decision —it also implied recognizing the weakness of the dictatorship—. His alternative was to issue a new loan for 350 million pesetas to be subscribed by Spanish banks, trusting, according to Eduardo González Calleja, "that the patriotism of Spanish capitalism would cover the issue, but the loan failed miserably". Faced with the failure of his monetary policy, Calvo Sotelo presented his resignation on January 21, 1930, only a few days before the resignation of Primo de Rivera.

Historian Eduardo González Calleja makes the following evaluation of the Spanish economy during the dictatorship of Primo de Rivera:

The dictatorship was one of the crucial stages in the process of formation of Spanish capitalist society, prolonging previous attitudes (nationalism), accentuating others (state interventionism, monopolistic practices, support for financial power) or trying out new formulas for the promotion of production and distribution of income (corporate organization, creation of new credit entities, adjustments in the taxation system, and so on). It was a period dominated by a strong expansionary movement of industrial production, with a growth rate of 5.5% per year and a duration of eight years, unprecedented since 1850-1870, although some authors conclude that the rapid growth of the 1920s could have been greater had it not been for the fact that state interventionism and protectionism prevented full advantage from being taken of the external expansionary cycle. However, as [Francisco] Comín observes, protectionism, corporativism, state interventionism and the existence of oligopolies and monopolies were common in Europe between the wars, although they manifested themselves in Spain with an intensity and peculiarities different from those known in other countries.

=== Social policy ===
In 1924 Primo de Rivera appointed Eduardo Aunós, a former militant of the Lliga Regionalista, as Undersecretary of Labor to organize the new corporate system of labor relations —which would culminate in the creation of the National Corporate Organization in November 1926— and to develop a series of social measures. Although during the period of the military directorate the first ones were already enacted —among them, the cheap housing construction plan stood out— it was during the Civil Directory when most of them were adopted. In July 1926, subsidies for the large families of workers and civil servants, the regulation of workers' retirement and the regulation of home work were established. In December of that year the Sunday Rest Law was passed, and the following year measures against night work by women were approved. In 1928 the exemption from profit tax on wages of less than 8.5 pesetas was decreed, and in March 1929 pregnant women were included in the welfare insurance.During these years, the number of beneficiaries of workers' pensions tripled from 1,212,633 in 1923 to 4,017,882 in 1930 thanks to the notable increase in the funds of the Instituto Nacional de Previsión —from 20 million for pensions in 1922 to 292 million in 1930—.

== Fall of the dictatorship ==
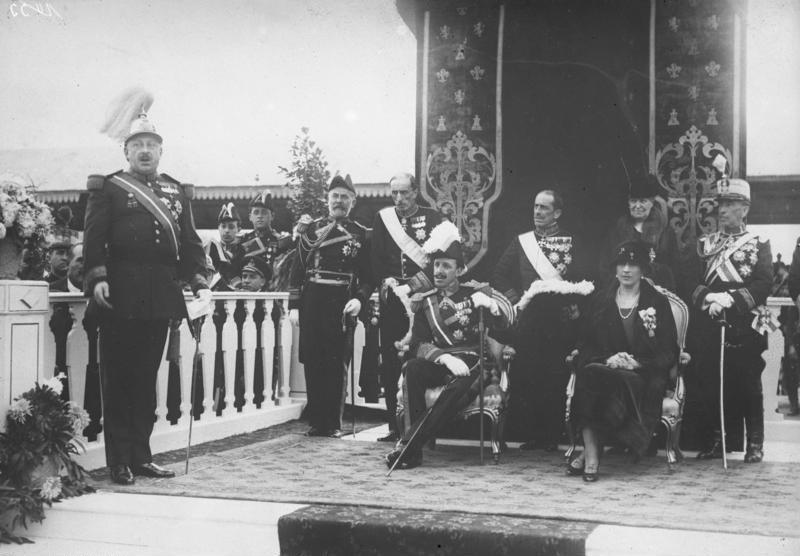
Primo de Rivera delivers a speech before the Spanish monarchs on the occasion of the 25th anniversary of the enthronement of Alfonso XIII.

The social and political sectors that had initially lent their support to the dictatorship gradually withdrew it: the peripheral nationalisms when the dictatorship failed to fulfill its promise of "decentralization" and ended up dissolving the Commonwealth of Catalonia; the business organizations dissatisfied with the "interference" of the UGT in their companies; the intellectual and university sectors that abandoned their "benevolent expectations", disillusioned with their conservative "regenerationism"; various liberal social and political groups that saw how the dictatorship intended to perpetuate itself in power, failing to fulfill its promise of being a "temporary regime"; and so on. The progressive loss of support for the dictatorship caused the King to begin "to consider that perhaps the Crown was at risk if it continued to be tied to the figure of the dictator".

There were two coup d'état attempts to remove Primo de Rivera from power and return to the constitutional system. The first was known as the Sanjuanada because it was planned for June 24, 1926. The second took place in January 1929 in Valencia and its main promoter was the conservative politician José Sánchez Guerra. In this last attempt the artillerymen also played an important role. Between the two failed coups d'état was the so-called Prats de Molló plot, an attempted invasion of Spain from French Catalonia led by Francesc Macià and his party Estat Catalá, in which Catalan anarcho-syndicalist groups of the CNT-AIT collaborated.

As the dictatorship was losing support, opposition groups grew. Among the members of the parties of the time of the old politics who confronted the dictatorship was the conservative José Sánchez-Guerra, who, as he had promised, when the National Consultative Assembly was convened, went into exile from Spain, and later participated in the attempted coup d'état of January 1929. Other politicians would go even further and openly join the Republican camp, such as Niceto Alcalá-Zamora and Miguel Maura Gamazo, who founded the Liberal Republican Right. For their part, the Republicans were reinforced by Manuel Azaña's new Republican Action Group and reached unity of action with the "Republican Alliance", founded in February 1926, on the anniversary of the First Spanish Republic.

Faced with the progressive loss of social and political support and the growth of the sectors opposed to the dictatorship, to which was added a personal factor (his diabetes was worsening), Primo de Rivera tried to strengthen his position before the Crown and sought the direct support of the Army (the other pillar on which his power was based). But the response of the general captains was too lukewarm (he had sent them a letter requesting their support to continue) so he presented his resignation to the King on January 28, 1930, and it was accepted on the spot. "Alfonso XIII, who had been for six years a King without a Constitution, named General Dámaso Berenguer [then head of the King's military household] president of the government with the purpose of returning to constitutional normality."

== Composition ==
← Composition of the government → (December 3 of 1925 - January 30 of 1930)
Position	Titleholder	Start	End	Political party
President	Miguel Primo de Rivera	December 3, 1925	January 30, 1930	Patriotic Union
State (since 1928 Foreign Affairs)	Miguel Primo de Rivera	February 20, 1927	January 30, 1930	Patriotic Union
Vice President	Severiano Martínez Anido	December 3, 1925	January 30, 1930	Patriotic Union
Government	Severiano Martínez Anido	December 3, 1925	January 30, 1930	Patriotic Union
State	José María Yanguas y Messía	December 3, 1925	February 20, 1927	Patriotic Union
Grace and Justice (since 1928 Justice and Worship)	Galo Ponte y Escartín	December 3, 1925	January 30, 1925	Patriotic Union
War (since 1928 Army)	Juan O’Donnell y Vargas	December 3, 1925	March 26, 1928	Patriotic Union
War (since 1928 Army)	Severiano Martínez Anido (interino)	March 26, 1928	November 3, 1928	Patriotic Union
War (since 1928 Army)	Julio Ardanaz y Crespo	November 3, 1928	January 30, 1930	Patriotic Union
Treasury	José Calvo Sotelo	December 3, 1925	January 21, 1930	Patriotic Union
Treasury	Francisco Moreno Zuleta	January 21, 1930	January 30, 1930	Patriotic Union
Navy	Honorio Cornejo Carvajal	December 3, 1925	November 3, 1928	Patriotic Union
Navy	Mateo García de los Reyes	November 3, 1928	January 30, 1930	Patriotic Union
Development	Rafael Benjumea y Burín	December 3, 1925	January 30, 1928	Patriotic Union
Public Instruction and Fine Arts	Eduardo Callejo de la Cuesta	December 3, 1925	January 30, 1930	Patriotic Union
Labor, Commerce and Industry (since 1928 Labor and Welfare)	Eduardo Aunós Pérez	December 3, 1925	January 30, 1930	Patriotic Union
National Economy	Francisco Moreno Zuleta	November 3, 1928	January 21, 1930	Patriotic Union
National Economy	Sebastián Castedo Palero	December 21, 1923	February 7, 1924	Patriotic Union

Predecessor: Military directorate of Miguel Primo de Rivera	December 3, 1925 - January 30, 1930	Successor: Government of Dámaso Berenguer

== See also ==
- 1926 Spanish coup d'état
- 1929 Spanish coup d'état
- Military directorate of Miguel Primo de Rivera
- Fall of the dictatorship of Miguel Primo de Rivera

== Bibliography ==
- Barrio, Ángeles (2004). La modernización de España (1917-1939). Política y sociedad (in Spanish). Madrid: Síntesis. ISBN 84-9756-223-2.
- Ben-Ami, Shlomo (2012). El cirujano de hierro. La dictadura de Primo de Rivera (1923-1930) [(Fascism from above: Dictathorship of Primo de Rivera in Spain, 1983)] (in Spanish). Barcelona: RBA. pp. 103–109. ISBN 978-84-9006-161-9.
- García Queipo de Llano, Genoveva (1997). El reinado de Alfonso XIII. La modernización fallida (in Spanish). Madrid: Historia 16. ISBN 84-7679-318-9.
- González Calleja, Eduardo (2005). La España de Primo de Rivera. La modernización autoritaria 1923-1930 (in Spanish). Madrid: Alianza Editorial. ISBN 84-206-4724-1.
- Juliá, Santos (1999). Un siglo de España. Política y sociedad (in Spanish). Madrid: Marcial Pons. ISBN 84-9537903-1.
- Juliá, Santos (2009). La Constitución de 1931 (in Spanish). Madrid: Iustel. ISBN 978-84-9890-083-5.
- Tavera, Susanna (1984). Els anarcosindicalistes catalans i la dictadura (in Catalan). L'Avenç.
