= Maurism =

Conservative Spanish movement

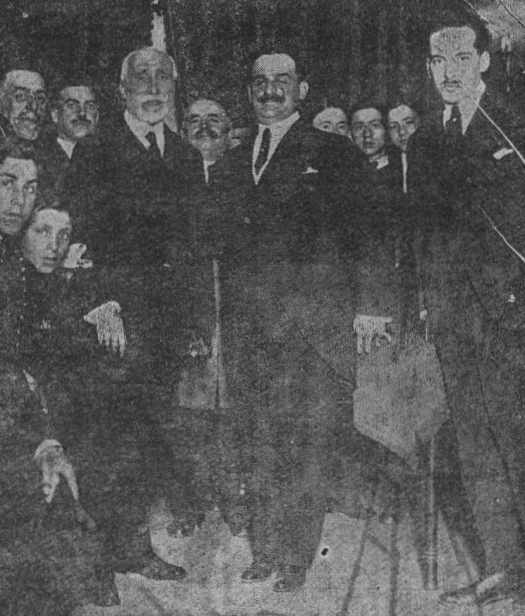
Antonio Maura and Antonio Goicoechea in a Maurist meeting (April 1917).

Maurism (Maurismo in Spanish) was a conservative political movement that bloomed in Spain from 1913 around the political figure of Antonio Maura after a schism in the Conservative Party between idóneos ('apt ones') and mauristas ('maurists'). Its development took place in a period of crisis for the dynastic parties of the Spanish Restoration regime. The movement, which fragmented in several factions in the 1920s, has been portrayed as a precursor of the Spanish radical right.

== History ==
The 1913 refusal by Antonio Maura to accept the terms of the turno pacífico (the alternation in government between the two major parties in the Restoration two-party system) and assume the presidency of the Council of Ministers led to a schism in the Conservative Party between idóneos (supporters of Eduardo Dato and dynastic normality) and the followers of Maura, leading to the establishment of a new movement, maurismo. In October 1913 a seminal speech by Ángel Ossorio y Gallardo delivered in Zaragoza gave birth to the so-called maurismo callejero ('street Maurism'). This side of Maurism became active in street politics using popular agitation, even physical violence.

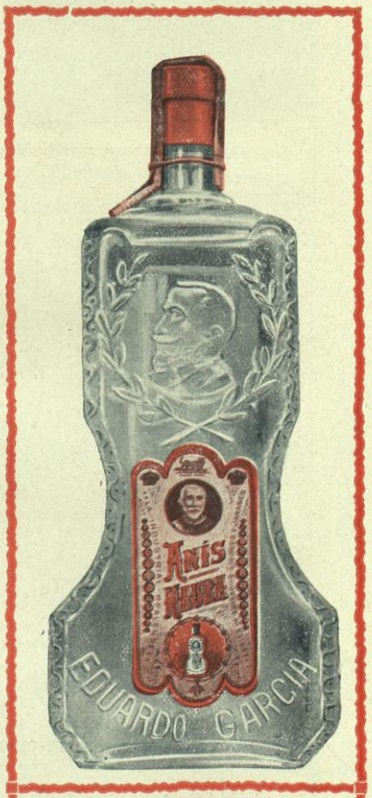
Bottle of "Anís Maura", promoted by the Maurist Youth.

Maurism, aside from the figure of Antonio Maura, was partially inspired by historian Gabriel Maura (son of Antonio Maura), and received some influences from the ideas of French monarchist Charles Maurras—Maura and Maurras wrote to each other—and Action Française. However, Antonio Maura never got to lend support to the radical side of the movement created around him. Other notable Mauristas were José Calvo Sotelo, José Félix de Lequerica, Fernando Suárez de Tangil and César Silió. Miguel Ángel Perfecto identified three inner factions within the movement: the social Catholic one of Ossorio, the liberal-conservative strand of Gabriel Maura and the neoconservatives of Goicoechea. Additionally, the followers of Juan de la Cierva within the Conservative Party, as they drifted away from the orthodoxy of Eduardo Dato, ended up orbiting around authoritarian stances close to Maurism, but they did not merge into the organizational structure.

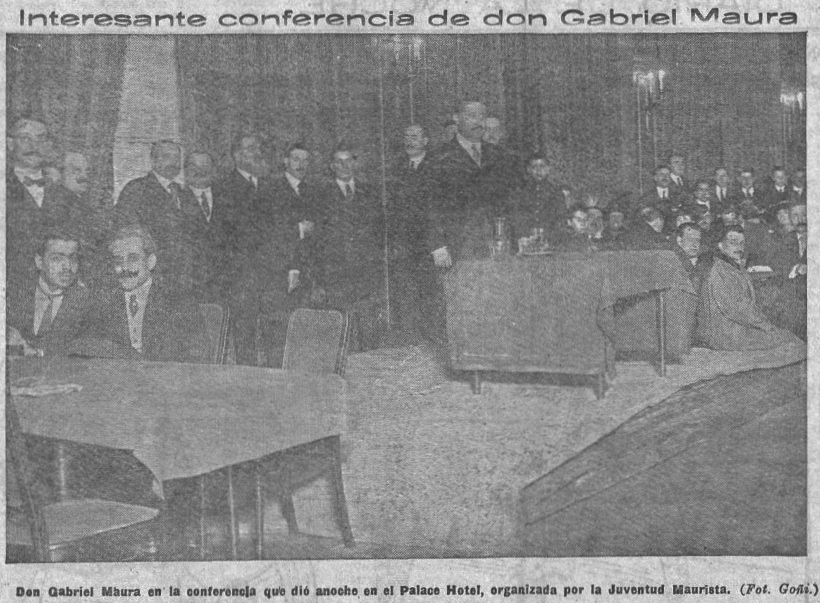
Conference by Gabriel Maura organised by the Maurist Youth in the Westin Palace Hotel (March 1917).

The social strata prevalent among mauristas, whose first National Assembly was held in January 1913, were young people from the aristocracy and the wealthy middle classes. The movement built up its own organic structure and related media, created Maurist circles and even worker associations and presented candidates for local and general elections. Maurists were noted for the wide dissemination of their propaganda, embracing the catch-phrase "¡Maura Sí!" ('Yes to Maura!'). Attempts were made to reach capture working class support but these did not succeed as it was perceived as too middle class and establishment-minded, with republican groups managing to mobilise the workers much more successfully.

Presenting itself as an antithetical to the Restoration regime instituted by Antonio Cánovas del Castillo (canovismo), Maurism tried to lead a conservative modernization, endorsing an interventionist, nationalist and corporative ideological project. It has been characterised as a regenerationist movement. It shared with that movement the belief that defeat in the Spanish–American War had been the fault of a political system that was rife with incompetence and corruption, with Maurism prescribing the imposition of a new patriotic system from above by elites. Another feature of Maurism was confessional Catholicism. The movement's social action could be described as paternalist, with a tutelary function of the upper classes over the lower ones. During World War I, Maurists largely supported Germanophile stances, although Maura himself defended neutrality and Ossorio endorsed Germanophobia.

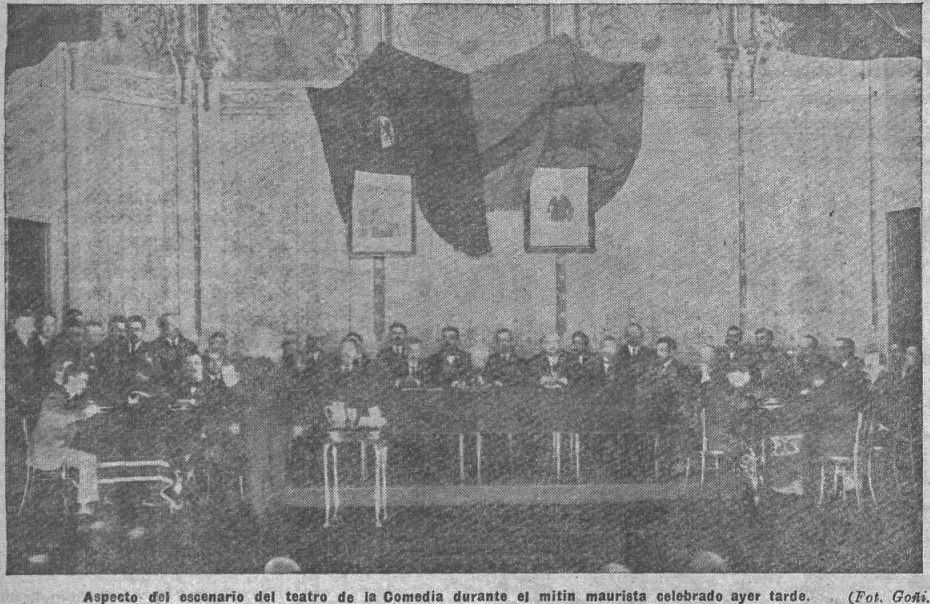
Maurist meeting in the Teatro de la Comedia, Madrid (March 1917).

In the 1917 Madrid local elections nine Maurist councillors were elected. At this election non-dynastic unconventional candidates (Maurists and the republican-socialist coalition) took marginally more seats than the candidates elected by the traditional Restoration parties. The 1919 Maura cabinet, that included three Maurists, Goicoechea, Silió and Ossorio, was a window of opportunity for Maurism but it ended up in failure. Maura had become aware of the difficulties in fulfilling the Maurist agenda without the support of the dynastic forces. Since then the movement shifted towards fragmentation.

In the 1920 election to the Cortes the Maurist fraction only got 22 members of the parliament. Two "antagonistic" factions split from Maurism. In one side the scion led by Ángel Ossorio y Gallardo, supportive of social Catholicism and Christian democracy, founded the Partido Social Popular in 1922. On the other side Antonio Goicoechea led an anti-liberal and authoritarian scion, vouching for an "organic democracy", concept later advanced by Francoism. In 1922 the Maurists around Manuel Delgado Barreto and the journal La Acción looked to Italian Fascism. Goicoechea insisted on a proclaimed popular support in Spain for the rise of "a Mussolini" in the country. The very vagueness that underpinned Maurism, which insisted on a "revolution from above" but left the interpretation of this vague concept up to individual adherents, has been characterised as encouraging this factionalism and preventing it from fully emerging as a coherent ideology. For his part Maura never addressed these issues, preferring to remain an aloof figurehead rather than seeking to lead an organised political movement.

Maurists such as José Calvo Sotelo and Goicoechea gave support after the September 1923 Primo de Rivera coup d'etat to the latter's dictatorship — whose coming was cheered by the overwhelming majority of the Maurists — and they would finally participate in Renovación Española ('Spanish Renovation') during the Second Republic. José Luis Rodríguez Jiménez notes that Maurism added at some point the "Neither Right Nor Left" rhetoric, identified by the author as a feature of a drift from liberal conservatism towards authoritarian conservatism.

== Bibliography ==
- Álvarez Delgado, Irma Fuencisla (2003). "Apuntes para una historia de la Restauración en la provincia de Cuenca: el maurismo (1913-1923), un movimiento sin masas" (PDF). Añil. 25. Ciudad Real: Universidad de Castilla-La Mancha; Centro de Estudios de Castilla-La Mancha: 77–80. ISSN 1133-2263.
- Avilés Farré, Juan; Elizalde Pérez-Grueso, María Dolores; Sueiro Seoane, Susana (2002). Historia política de España, 1875-1939. Vol. 1. Tres Cantos: Ediciones Istmo. ISBN 84-7090-320-9.
- Ben-Ami, Shlomo (1980). "Hacia una comprensión de la dictadura de Primo de Rivera". Revista de Derecho Político. 6: 107–132. ISSN 0210-7562.
- Blinkhorn, Martin (2003) [1990]. "Conservatism, traditionalism and fascism in Spain, 1898-1937". In Martin Blinkhorn (ed.). Fascists and Conservatives: The Radical Right and the Establishment in Twentieth-Century Europe. London: Routledge. pp. 118–137. ISBN 0-203-39323-6.
- Bunk, Brian D. (2008). "'A shape note of pugnacity': Conservative youth groups in Spain, 1914–1939". In Brian D. Bunk; Sasha D Pack; Carl-Gustaf Scott (eds.). Nation and conflict in modern Spain: essays in honor of Stanley G. Payne. pp. 15–29.
- Hernández Burgos, Claudio (2011). "El largo camino hacia el franquismo: Antonio Gallego Burín (1915-1939)". Revista del Centro de Estudios Históricos de Granada y su Reino (23). Granada: Universidad de Granada; Centro de Estudios Históricos de Granada y su Reino: 193–206. ISSN 0213-7461.
- Cabo, Miguel; Miguez, Antonio (2009). "El maurismo en Galicia. Un modelo de modernización conservadora en el marco de la Restauración". Hispania. Revista Española de Historia. 69 (231). Madrid: Consejo Superior de Investigaciones Científicas: 87–116. doi:10.3989/hispania.2009.v69.i231.100. hdl:10347/22715. ISSN 0018-2141.
- Fuentes Codera, Maximiliano (2013). "Germanófilos y neutralistas: proyectos tradicionalistas y regeneracionistas para España (1914-1918)". Ayer. 91 (3). Madrid: Asociación de Historia Contemporánea y Marcial Pons Ediciones de Historia: 63–92. ISSN 1134-2277.
- Gil Pecharromán, Julio (1993). "Notables en busca de masas: El conservadurismo en la crisis de la Restauración" (PDF). Espacio, Tiempo y Forma. Serie V, Historia Contemporánea. 6. Madrid: Universidad Nacional de Educación a Distancia: 233–266. ISSN 1130-0124. Archived from the original on 2015-06-09.
- Gómez Ochoa, Fidel (1990). "El gobierno de concentración en el pensamiento y al acción política de Antonio Maura (1918-1922)". Revista de Estudios Políticos (69). Madrid: Centro de Estudios Políticos y Constitucionales: 239–252. ISSN 0048-7694.
- González Calleja, Eduardo (1998). La razón de la fuerza: orden público, subversión y violencia política en la España de la Restauración (1875-1917). Madrid: Consejo Superior de Investigaciones Científicas. ISBN 84-00-07778-4.
- González Calleja, Eduardo; Souto Kustrín, Sandra (2007). "De la dictadura a la república: orígenes y auge de los movimientos juveniles en España". Hispania. Revista Española de Historia. 67 (225). Madrid: Consejo Superior de Investigaciones Científicas: 73–102. doi:10.3989/hispania.2007.v67.i225.36. hdl:10261/162652. ISSN 0018-2141.
- González Cuevas, Pedro Carlos (1990), "La recepción del pensamiento maurrasiano en España (1914-1930)" (PDF), Espacio, tiempo y forma. Serie V, Historia contemporánea, vol. 3, no. 1, pp. 343–356, ISSN 1130-0124
- González Cuevas, Pedro Carlos; Montero, Feliciano (2001). "Los conservadores españoles en el siglo XX". In Antonio Morales Moya (ed.). Las claves de la España del siglo XX. Vol. 4. pp. 39–62. ISBN 84-95486-25-3.
- González Cuevas, Pedro Carlos (2008). "Tradicionalismo, catolicismo y nacionalismo: la extrema derecha durante el régimen de la Restauración (1898-1930)". Ayer (71). Madrid: Asociación de Historia Contemporánea y Marcial Pons Ediciones de Historia: 25–52. ISSN 1134-2277. JSTOR 41325977.
- González Hernández, María Jesús (1989). Ciudadanía y Acción. El conservadurismo maurista 1907-1923). Siglo XXI.
- González, María Jesús (1988). "Un aspecto de la "revolución desde arriba": maurismo y acción social". Espacio, Tiempo y Forma. Serie V, Historia contemporánea (1). Madrid: Universidad Nacional de Educación a Distancia: 145–162. doi:10.5944/etfv.1.1988.2654. ISSN 1130-0124. Archived from the original on 2016-03-07.
- Marín Arce, José María (1997). "El conservadurismo liberal de Sánchez Guerra". In Javier Tusell Gómez; Feliciano Montero García; José María Marín Arce (eds.). Las derechas en la España contemporánea. Barcelona and Madrid: Anthropos y Universidad Nacional de Educación a Distancia. pp. 129–152. ISBN 84-7658-524-1.
- Pasamar Alzuria, Gonzalo (1993), "La configuración de la imagen de la 'Decadencia española' en los siglos XIX y XX (de la historia filosófica a la historiografía profesional)", Revista: Manuscrits. Revista d'Història Moderna, no. 11, pp. 183–214, ISSN 0213-2397
- Payne, Stanley G. (1999). Fascism in Spain, 1923–1977. University of Wisconsin Press.
- Perfecto, Miguel Ángel (2012). "La derecha radical española y el pensamiento antiliberal francés en el primer tercio del siglo XX: de Charles Maurras a Georges Valois". Studia historica. Historia contemporánea (30). Salamanca: Ediciones Universidad de Salamanca: 47–94. ISSN 0213-2087.
- Preston, Paul (1981). "Spain". In S.J. Woolf (ed.). Fascism in Europe. London: Methuen. ISBN 0-416-30230-0.
- Preston, Paul (1995) [1990]. The Politics of Revenge: Fascism and the Military in 20th-century Spain. Routledge. ISBN 0-203-40037-2.
- Romero Salvadó, Francisco J.; Smith, A. (2010). The Agony of Spanish Liberalism: From Revolution to Dictatorship 1913–23. Springer.
- Quiroga, Alejandro; Arco, Miguel Ángel del (2012). Right-Wing Spain in the Civil War Era: Soldiers of God and Apostles of the Fatherland, 1914-45. Bloomsbury Publishing. p. 9.
- Rodríguez Jiménez, José L. (2006). "Una unidad militar en los orígenes del fascismo en España: la Legión" (PDF). Pasado y Memoria. Revista de Historia Contemporánea. 5 (5). Alicante: Universidad de Alicante: 219–240. doi:10.14198/PASADO2006.5.11. ISSN 1579-3311.
- Rodríguez Jiménez, José Luis (2009). "¿Qué fue ser de derechas en España? conservadurismo liberal, derecha autoritaria, derecha franquista (y un epílogo)". Bulletin d'histoire contemporaine de l'Espagne (44): 21–58. ISSN 0987-4135.
- Romero Salvadó, Francisco J. (2002) [1999]. Spain 1914-1918: Between War and Revolution. London and Nueva York: Routledge. ISBN 0-415-21293-6.
- Tuñón de Lara, Manuel (1976). "Maura, el "maurismo" y sus élites". Mayurqa: Revista del Departament de Ciències Històriques i Teoria de les Arts (16). Palma de Mallorca: Universitat de les Illes Balears: 71–85. ISSN 0301-8296. Archived from the original on 2016-02-27.
- Tusell, Javier; Avilés, Juan (1986). La derecha española contemporánea. Sus orígenes: el maurismo. Madrid: Espasa-Calpe. ISBN 84-239-6529-5.
