= José Calvo Sotelo =

Spanish jurist and politician (1893–1936)

The Most Excellent José Calvo Sotelo
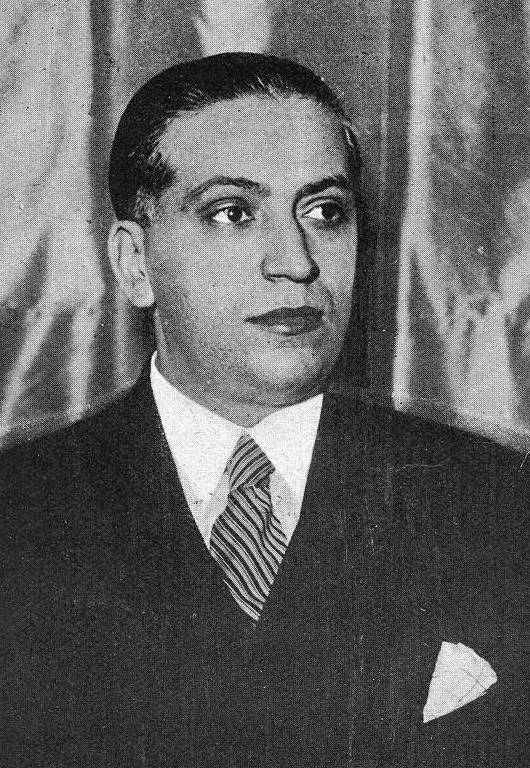

Minister of Finance of Spain
- In office 3 December 1925 – 21 January 1930
- Monarch: Alfonso XIII
- Prime Minister: Miguel Primo de Rivera
- Preceded by: José Corral Larre
- Succeeded by: Francisco Moreno Zuleta

Member of the Congress of Deputies
- In office 1919 – 1920; 1934 – 1936
- Constituency: Carballino; Orense

Personal details
- Born: 6 May 1893 Tui, Spain
- Died: 13 July 1936 (aged 43) Madrid, Spain
- Cause of death: Assassination (gunshot wounds)
- Resting place: Almudena cemetery
- Party: Renovación Española
- Other political affiliations: Maurist
- Spouse: Enriqueta Grondona (1892–1971)
- Relations: Leopoldo Calvo Sotelo (brother); Leopoldo Calvo-Sotelo (nephew)
- Occupation: politician, jurist

José Calvo Sotelo, 1st Duke of Calvo Sotelo, GE (6 May 1893 – 13 July 1936) was a Spanish jurist and politician. He was the minister of finance during the dictatorship of Miguel Primo de Rivera and a leading figure during the Spanish Second Republic. During this period, he became an important part of Spanish Renovation, a monarchist movement. Calvo Sotelo's assassination in July 1936 by the bodyguard of PSOE party leader Indalecio Prieto was an immediate prelude to the triggering of the Spanish military coup of July 1936 that was plotted since February 1936, the partial failure of which marked the beginning of the Spanish Civil War.

== Early years ==
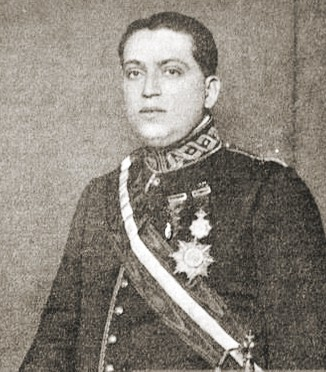
Calvo Sotelo dressed in the uniform of the Cuerpo de Abogados del Estado.

Calvo Sotelo was born on 6 May 1893 in Tui, Galicia to Pedro Calvo y Camina, a judge, and Elisa Sotelo Lafuente. He received a degree in Law and moved to the capital, Madrid. In 1913 he joined a maurist circle in the Ateneo where he socialised with other members of the Maurist Youth such as Melchor Fernández Almagro, Pío Zabala, Antonio Ballesteros Beretta, Pío Ballesteros Álava, Quintiliano Saldaña, Manuel Palacios Olmedo, Rogerio Sánchez and Fernando Suárez de Tangil. He became Secretary of the Academy of Moral and Political Sciences of the Ateneo Mercantil de Madrid and a professor at the Universidad Central. He was a member of Antonio Maura's Conservative Party. In his first post he was an administrative officer in the Ministry of Grace and Justice.

In the 1919 election to the Congress of Deputies, despite Maura having in mind the plan of not putting forward a Maurista in the district of Carballino in exchange for a seat in another district, the 25 year-old Calvo Sotelo put himself forward as a candidate. Challenging mainstream conservative candidate Leopoldo García Durán, a follower of Gabino Bugallal (Count of Bugallal), Calvo Sotelo won the seat in the election. In 1922, he was made Civil Governor of Valencia.

=== Dictatorship of Primo de Rivera ===
Following the 1923 coup d'état by Miguel Primo de Rivera, Calvo Sotelo lent support to the dictatorship. Appointed Director General of Local Administration in 1923, he was the creator of the 1924 Municipal Statute that, inspired by previous projects of Antonio Maura, sought to reform the structure of the State at a local level and was cemented by the free election of mayors and the councillors. He also promulgated a Provincial Statute in 1925. Neither statute got to be enforced. Primo de Rivera then appointed Calvo Sotelo as finance minister of the Civil Directory of the dictatorship in 1925, and he served from December 1925 until January 1930. During his tenure as Minister of Finance, his programme to achieve economic growth featured protectionist, nationalist and interventionist policies.

=== Second Republic ===
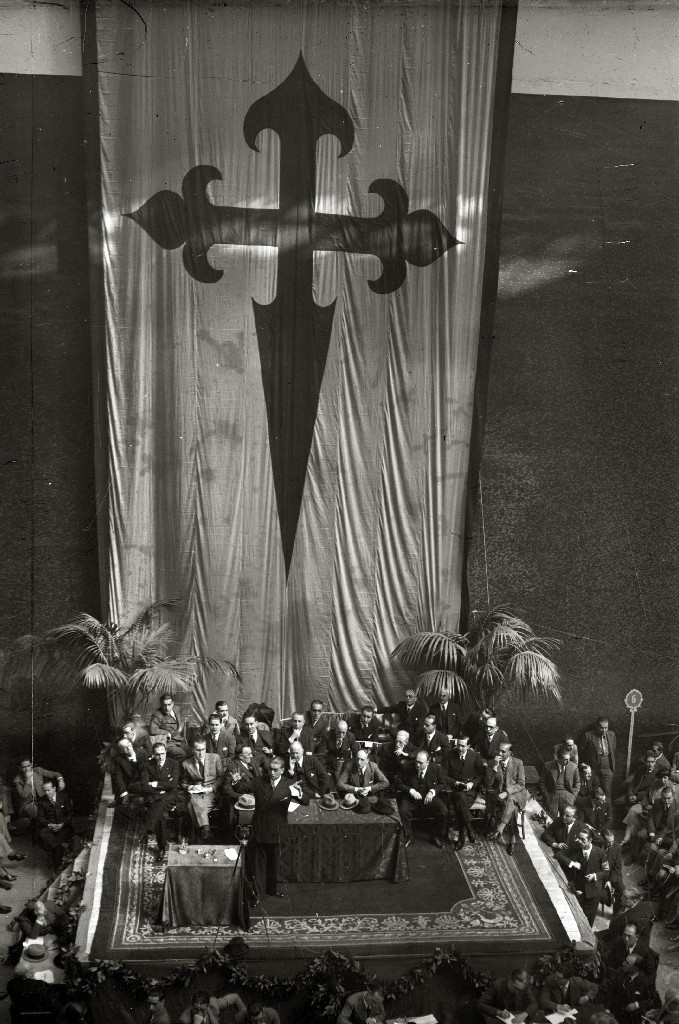
Calvo Sotelo giving a speech in the Urumea Fronton of San Sebastián (1935).

After the proclamation of the Second Spanish Republic on 14 April 1931, Calvo Sotelo, because of his prior collaboration with the dictatorship and his fear of being subject to trial, went into exile to Portugal and later France along with other politicians. He was welcomed the day after his arrival in Lisbon by António de Oliveira Salazar, then minister of Finance. Calvo Sotelo spent his time in Portugal studying the Ditadura Nacional regime. After being given a passport by the Portuguese authorities, he lived between February 1932 and May 1934 in Paris, where he became connected with the ideas of Charles Maurras. He also befriended Léon Daudet, Jacques Bainville and Charles Benoist in France. Despite his exile he had been elected as member of the parliament for the district of Ourense both in the 1931 and 1933 elections.

After the passing of an amnesty law on 20 April 1934, he returned to Spain with the intention of leaving an imprint on the Alfonsine right, then represented by Renovación Española and led by Antonio Goicoechea. After his return, he had also tried to join the Fascist Falange Española de las JONS, but, albeit endorsed by Ruiz de Alda and Ledesma, his application was vetoed by José Antonio Primo de Rivera, who understood his leadership was being challenged and deemed the Galician politician as "reactionary". By the 9th of May Calvo Sotelo was in the Cortes.

He stated that the "Restoration" of the prior liberal monarchy was not intended, but the "instauration" of an anti-liberal one. Sotelo had more personal charisma than Goicoechea and eventually eclipsed him. He became the leading figure of the Bloque Nacional ('National Block'), a newly created electoral project that sought to unite the anti-republican right. The foundational manifesto espoused a return to traditional values, through the means of an authoritarian monarchy and the role of the Armed Forces as counter-revolutionary agent. Neither the leader of the CEDA (José María Gil-Robles) nor the leader of the Falange Española de las JONS (José Antonio Primo de Rivera) endorsed the initiative, which, aside from members of Renovación Española, drew most of its support from the ranks of the traditionalist Carlists. It was also supported by the small group headed by the Doctor Albiñana, leader of the Spanish Nationalist Party.

After the victory of the leftist Popular Front in the February 1936 election, José Calvo Sotelo became the leading speaker of the anti-republican forces in the Parliament, preparing the mood of anti-republican supporters for a coup d'état. Sotelo was aware that there was a planned rebellion within the army and while he would welcome such a development, believing only an authoritarian regime would solve Spain's problems, he was not part of the conspiracy and was not sure when the planned rebellion would happen or if it even would, thus he continued his normal political and personal life.

== Assassination ==
After the Guardia de Asalto leader José Castillo was killed by falangists at 10 pm on 12 July 1936, a group of Guardia de Asalto and other leftist militiamen led by Civil Guard Fernando Condés went to Calvo Sotelo's house in a government's car in the early hours of 13 July on a revenge mission. While they also planned to kidnap Gil-Robles, he was not in Madrid at the time. Sotelo was arrested and later shot dead in a police truck. His body was dumped at the entrance of one of the city's cemeteries. According to all later investigations, the perpetrator of the murder was a socialist gunman, Luis Cuenca, who was known as the bodyguard of PSOE leader Indalecio Prieto. Both Condés and Cuenca later died in the first few days of the civil war.

=== Trial ===
Though the government denounced the murder and promised to investigate, it made no effort at conciliation. Censorship was immediately imposed to conceal the truth, nothing was done to apprehend those directly responsible and instead numerous Falangists and rightists were arrested (this was not unusual behavior when members of the political right were murdered by Popular Front members). A judge, Ursicino Gómez Carbajo, did take up the case independently within hours but the case was abruptly taken off his hands by the Guardia de Asalto, seemingly because he was an independent and honest judge. The first political response was from the Communist Party, who decided the assassination represented a time to forward one of their legislative drafts to other Popular Front groups, which essentially called for the banning of numerous right-wing parties, including CEDA, Renovación Española and Falange, the confiscation of their property and the confiscation of several newspapers. Although its presentation before parliament was impossible due parliament's postponement, its provisions were carried out during the civil war in the Republican zone and the Popular Front government seemed to act in its spirit, announcing the decision to close down the centers of both Renovación Española and the CNT in Madrid, despite neither of these groups having anything to do with the killing.

=== Funeral ===
Sotelo was buried in a public funeral attended by thousands of rightists, many of whom gave the fascist salute, which infuriated the police. Several hundred rightists then marched to the city center in a political demonstration. They were stopped by a police barricade and had to show they were unarmed before they were allowed to pass. As the unarmed protesters approached the center, they were fired upon by the Guardia de Asalto and police units, with a few protesters being killed. Three members of Guardia de Asalto who protested this were temporarily arrested, while some police from Castillo's barracks felt their unit's honor had been stained by the assassination and demanded an investigation. Two Guardia de Asalto units were seemingly on the verge of mutiny. The final session of the Cortes before the war on 15 July was dominated by the assassination. Monarchists and rightists accused the government of creating the atmosphere in which Sotelo's killing was made possible. Gil-Robles presented a list of deaths and disorders of the past month. He said that every day he read calls in leftist newspapers for the right to be subject to "extermination" and warned that "the day will come when the violence you have unleashed will be turned against you."

=== Aftermath ===
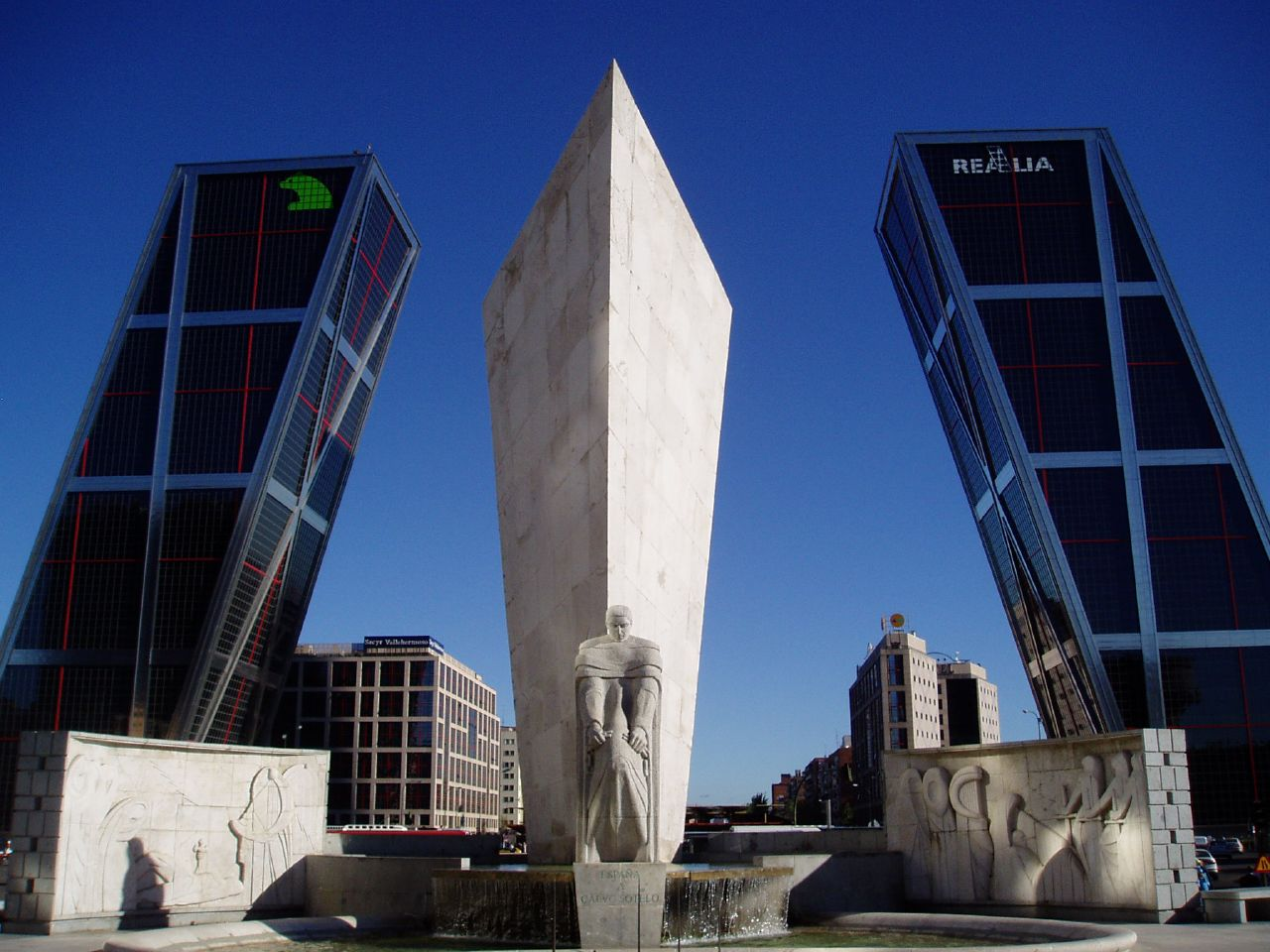
Monument to Calvo Sotelo in Madrid.

Anti-communist historian Brian Crozier explained the significance of the killing:

It is hard perhaps to convey the enormity of this deed, for it is almost impossible to transport it to other countries and different circumstances. Alec Douglas-Home kidnapped and murdered by Special Branch detectives? Senator Robert F. Kennedy kidnapped and murdered by the F.B.I.? Unthinkable, one might say. And that is the point: in Spain in the summer of 1936, the unthinkable had become normal.

Anti-republican conspirators led by General Emilio Mola seized the moment, accelerating the military coup that had been plotted since the February election. According to Antony Beevor, Sotelo's assassination inadvertently caused many more people to support the coup than would otherwise have occurred. In 1960, Franco stated that the revolt would never have developed the strength necessary if not for the assassination. The uprising of part of the Army, starting with the Army of Africa in Melilla on 17 July 1936, under the assumed command of Generals Emilio Mola, Francisco Franco, Gonzalo Queipo de Llano and José Sanjurjo, marked the beginning of the Spanish Civil War.

== Bibliography ==
- Alexander, Gerard (2002). "The Right and the Breakdown of Spanish Democracy, 1931-1936". The Sources of Democratic Consolidation. New York: Cornell University Press. pp. 103–137. ISBN 978-0-8014-3947-6.
- Arbeloa, Víctor Manuel (2008). La Iglesia que buscó la concordia. Encuentro. ISBN 978-8499206363.
- Ben-Ami, Shlomo (1981). "La Dictadura de Primo de Rivera y el final de la Monarquía Parlamentaria". In José Andrés-Gallego (ed.). Historia General de España y América: Revolución y Restauración. Vol. 16. Madrid: Rialp. pp. 523–580. ISBN 978-84-3212-11-42.
- Blasco de la Llave, Laura (2015). "L'Action Française ante la Guerra Civil Española: simpatías pronacionales de un movimiento". Revista de Estudios Políticos (167). Madrid. ISSN 0048-7694.
- Bullón de Mendoza y Gómez de Valugera, Alfonso (2004). José Calvo Sotelo. Barcelona: Ariel. ISBN 978-84-344-6718-7.
- Gibson, Ian (1986). La noche en que mataron a Calvo Sotelo. Barcelona: Plaza & Janés. ISBN 978-84-01-45061-7.
- Cabo, Miguel; Miguez, Antonio (2009). "El maurismo en Galicia. Un modelo de modernización conservadora en el marco de la Restauración". Hispania. Revista Española de Historia. 69 (231). Madrid: 87–116. doi:10.3989/hispania.2009.v69.i231.100. hdl:10347/22715. ISSN 0018-2141.
- Gil Pecharromán, Julio (1984). "El alfonsismo radical en las elecciones de febrero de 1936". Revista de Estudios Políticos (42). Madrid: 101–136. ISSN 0048-7694.
- Gil Pecharromán, Julio (2017). "Un partido para acabar con los partidos: el fascismo español, 1931-1936". Bulletin d'Histoire Contemporaine de l'Espagne. 51 (51): 69–84. doi:10.4000/bhce.673. ISSN 1968-3723.
- González Calleja, Eduardo; Rey Reguillo, Fernando del (1995). La defensa armada contra la revolución: una historia de las guardias cívicas en la España del siglo XX. Madrid: Consejo Superior de Investigaciones Científicas. ISBN 978-84-00-07552-1.
- González Calleja, Eduardo (2003). "El ex-rey". In Javier Moreno Luzón (ed.). Alfonso XIII, un político en el trono. Madrid: Marcial Pons. pp. 403–436. ISBN 978-84-95379-59-7.
- González Calleja, Eduardo (2008). "La violencia y sus discursos: los límites de la "fascistización" de la derecha española durante el régimen de la Segunda República". Ayer (71): 85–116. ISSN 1134-2277. JSTOR 41325979.
- González Calleja, Eduardo (2016). "Los discursos catastrofistas de los líderes de la derecha y la difusión del mito del "golpe de Estado comunista"". El Argonauta Español. 13. ISSN 1765-2901.
- González Cuevas, Pedro Carlos (1993). "El pensamiento socio-político de la derecha maurista". Boletín de la Real Academia de la Historia. 190 (3): 365–426. ISSN 0034-0626.
- González Cuevas, Pedro Carlos (2003). Maeztu: Biografía de un Nacionalista Español. Madrid: Marcial Pons Historia.
- Payne, Stanley G. (1999). Fascism in Spain, 1923–1977. University of Wisconsin Press. ISBN 978-0-299-16560-4.
- González Cuevas, Pedro Carlos; Montero, Feliciano (2001). "Los conservadores españoles en el siglo XX". In Antonio Morales Moya (ed.). Las claves de la España del siglo XX. Vol. 4. Sociedad Estatal España Nuevo Milenio. pp. 39–62. ISBN 978-84-95486-25-7.
- Luis Martín, Francisco (1994). ""Hermanos o extranjeros": la postura de ABC ante el nacionalismo catalán durante la Segunda República". Studia Historica. Historia Contemporánea. 12. Salamanca: 129–156. ISSN 0213-2087.
- Preston, Paul (1972). "Alfonsist Monarchism and the Coming of the Spanish Civil War". Journal of Contemporary History. 7 (3–4): 89–114. doi:10.1177/002200947200700307. JSTOR 259907. S2CID 153479989.
- Preston, Paul (1994). Franco, Caudillo de España. Mondadori. ISBN 978-84-397-0241-2.
- Preston, Paul (1995) [1990]. The Politics of Revenge: Fascism and the Military in 20th-century Spain. Routledge. ISBN 978-0-203-40037-1.
- Ranzato, Gabriele (2006). El eclipse de la democracia: la Guerra Civil española y sus orígenes, 1931-1939. Madrid: Siglo XXI de España Editores. ISBN 978-84-323-1248-9.
- Rodríguez Jiménez, José Luis (1993). "Los orígenes del pensamiento reaccionario español". Boletín de la Real Academia de la Historia. 190 (1). Madrid: 31–120. ISSN 0034-0626.
- Rodríguez Jiménez, José Luis (1994). Reaccionarios y golpistas: la extrema derecha en España: del tardofranquismo a la consolidación de la democracia, 1967-1982. Madrid: Consejo Superior de Investigaciones Científicas. ISBN 978-84-00-07442-5.
- Romero, Luis (1982). Por qué y cómo mataron a Calvo Sotelo. Barcelona: Planeta. ISBN 978-84-320-5678-9.
- Tortella, Gabriel; García Ruiz, José Luis (2013). "From Dictatorship to Republic: Spain and the Great Depression". Spanish Money and Banking. A History. Palgrave Macmillan. pp. 102–114. doi:10.1057/9781137317131_7. ISBN 978-1-349-34491-8.

Spanish nobility
New title	Duke of Calvo Sotelo (posthumous); 1948	Succeeded by José Calvo Sotelo Grondona
