= Francisco Moreno Zuleta =

Spanish lawyer, politician, and minister (1880-1963)

Francisco Moreno Zuleta 6th Count of the Andes
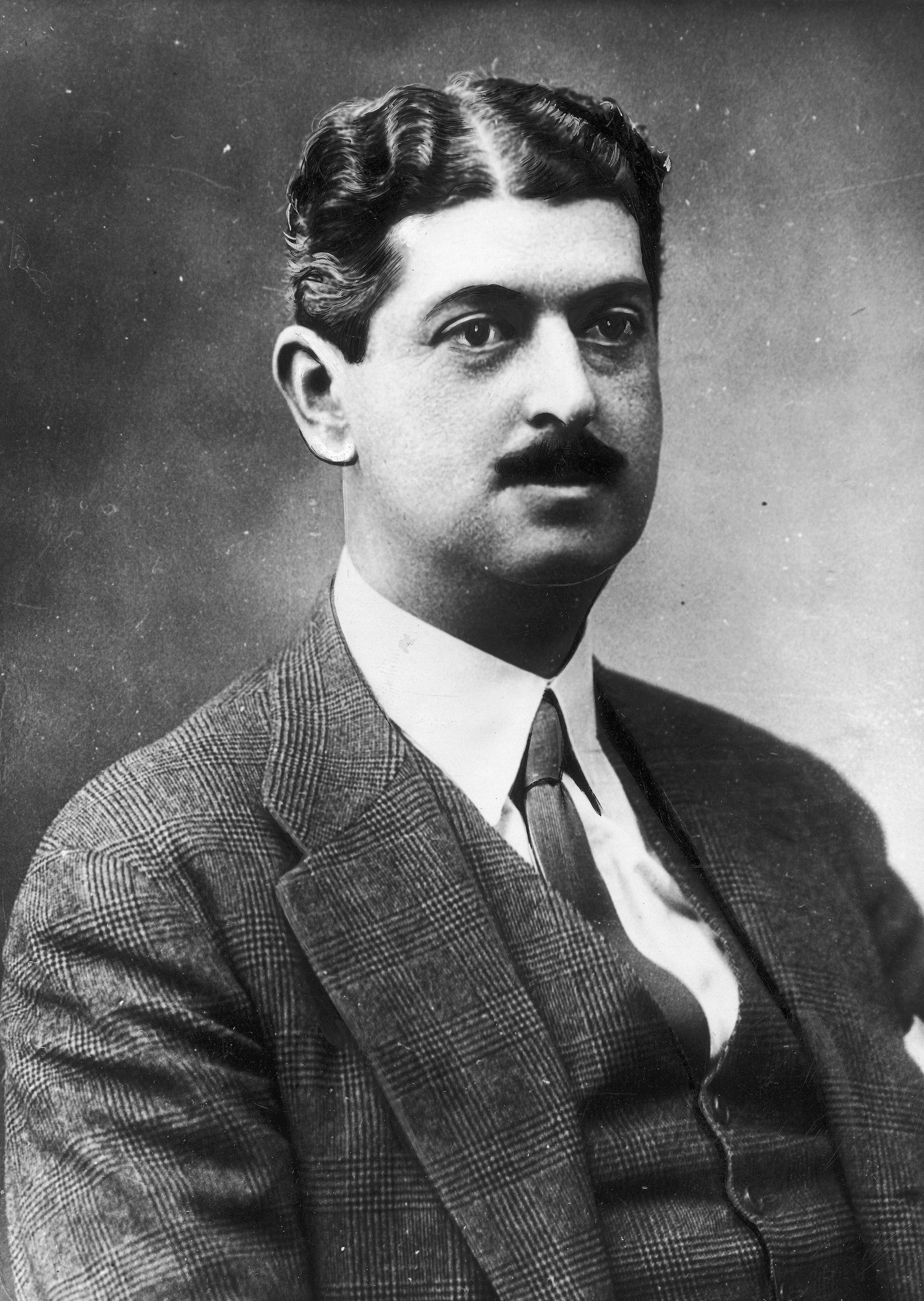

Minister of Finance of Spain
- In office 21 January 1930 – 30 January 1930
- Monarch: Alfonso XIII
- Prime Minister: Miguel Primo de Rivera; Dámaso Berenguer
- Preceded by: José Calvo Sotelo
- Succeeded by: Manuel Argüelles Argüelles

Minister of National Economy of Spain
- In office 3 November 1928 – 21 January 1930
- Monarch: Alfonso XIII
- Prime Minister: Miguel Primo de Rivera
- Preceded by: José Calvo Sotelo
- Succeeded by: Sebastián Castedo Palero

Personal details
- Born: Francisco de Asís Moreno y Zuleta de los Reales; 4 August 1880 Jerez de la Frontera, Spain
- Died: 3 July 1960 (aged 79) Madrid, Spain
- Party: Conservative Party (before 1926); Patriotic Union (after 1926)

Francisco de Asís Moreno y Zuleta de los Reales, 6th Count of the Andes (4 August 1880 – 3 July 1963) was a Spanish nobleman, lawyer and politician. He served as Minister of National Economy during the dictatorship of Miguel Primo de Rivera.

== Biography ==
Moreno Zuleta was born into a noble family in Jerez de la Frontera. He studied economics and law at the University of Deusto, where he also obtained a doctorate. A member of the Conservative Party, he was first elected to the Congress of Deputies in 1907 for the constituency of Cádiz. He served as a deputy there until 1921, when he took a seat in the Senate.

At the wish of Miguel Primo de Rivera, Moreno Zuleta joined the Patriotic Union in 1926. The following year, he became a member of the National Assembly. In 1928, he was appointed Minister of National Economy in Primo de Rivera's dictatorship; he held this office until January 1930, when he was appointed Minister of the Treasury. He resigned shortly after Primo de Rivera's resignation on 28 January.

With the proclamation of the Second Spanish Republic in 1931, Moreno Zuleta joined King Alfonso XIII in exile in Rome, where he served as head of the royal house from 1933. During the Spanish Civil War, he was the unofficial representative of the nationalist faction in the south of France. During the dictatorship of General Francisco Franco, Moreno Zuleta was the representative of Don Juan. He died in Madrid in 1963.
