= Eduardo Callejo de la Cuesta =

Spanish lawyer and politician

Minister of Public Instruction and Fine Arts
- In office December 1925 – January 1930

President of the Council of State
- In office 1945–1950

Member of the Francoist Cortes
- In office 1943–1950

Personal details
- Born: 21 September 1875; Madrid
- Died: 21 January 1950; Madrid
- Citizenship: Spanish
- Occupation: Professor · politician · lawyer

Eduardo Callejo de la Cuesta (1875–1950) was a Spanish jurist, politician and professor of the University of Valladolid who served as Minister of Public Instruction and Fine Arts during the Civil Directory of the Primo de Rivera dictatorship (1925–1930). His institutional career ended with his office presiding over the Council of State in Francoist Spain.

== Early life ==
Born on 21 September 1875 in Madrid, he moved to Sigüenza when he was eight and later to Cáceres, where he did the latest years of his secondary school education and passed the Baccalaureate. He started his university studies in law at the Central University of Madrid, graduated the University of Valladolid and obtained a PhD in the same area at the Central University. He was employed by the Audience of Seville from 1902 to 1905, when he returned to Valladolid to work in the later city audience. He became a lawyer in 1908 and in 1912 obtained the chair of Natural Law at the Faculty of Law of the University of Valladolid.

== Political career ==
From 1925 to 193, he served as Minister of Public Instruction and Fine Arts of the Primo de Rivera dictatorship. The attempted enactment of Article 53 of the Law of University Reform, promoted by Callejo in 1928, equating private education (Augustinian and Jesuit religious institutions in particular) with public education for the purposes of the issuance of academic degrees. That generated a wave of unrest and protests by the students. In 1930, soon after the end of the Primo de Rivera government, he joined the National Monarchist Union along other nostalgics for the regime such as José Calvo Sotelo, Ramiro de Maeztu and the son of the dictator, José Antonio.

After the onset of the Spanish State, he was designated member of the Cortes Españolas in 1943. In 1945, he was appointed as President of the Council of State and served until his death on 21 January 1950 in Madrid.

== Bibliography ==
- Calonge Velázquez, Antonio (2017). "Eduardo Callejo de la Cuesta: Un ministro primorriverista" (PDF). Revista Aequitas: Estudios sobre historia, derecho e instituciones (2017): 137–173. ISSN 2174-9493.
- González Calleja, Eduardo (2005). "Rebelión en las aulas: un siglo de movilizaciones" (PDF). Ayer. 59 (3). Madrid: Asociación de Historia Contemporánea; Marcial Pons Historia: 21–49. ISSN 2255-5838. Archived from the original (PDF) on 14 November 2016.
- González Cuevas, Pedro Carlos (2008). "Tradicionalismo, catolicismo y nacionalismo: la extrema derecha durante el régimen de la Restauración (1898-1930)". Ayer. 71 (3). Madrid: Asociación de Historia Contemporánea; Marcial Pons Historia: 21–52.
- Martínez Chávez, Eva Elizabeth (2011). "Callejo de la Cuesta, Eduardo (1875–1940)". Diccionario de catedráticos españoles de derecho (1847–1943). Getafe: Universidad Carlos III de Madrid.
- Porto Ucha, Ángel Serafín; Vázquez Ramil, Raquel (2015). María de Maeztu. Una antología de textos. Madrid: Editorial Dykinson. ISBN 978-84-9085-383-2.

Political offices
Preceded by Joaquín Salvatella Gisbert	Minister of Public Instruction and Fine Arts; 1925-1930	Succeeded by Jacobo Fitz-James Stuart
Preceded by Raimundo Fernández-Cuesta	President of the Council of State; 1945–1950	Succeeded by José Ibáñez Martín
