= Sebastián Castedo =

Spanish politician (1871–1953)

Minister of National Economy
- In office January 21, 1930 – January 30, 1930

Personal details
- Born: June 10, 1871 Madrid, Spain
- Died: January 3, 1953 (aged 81) Madrid, Spain
- Occupation: Politician

Sebastián Castedo Palero (June 10, 1871 - January 3, 1953) was a Spanish politician and minister of National Economy during the dictatorship of Primo de Rivera.
