= Julio Gil Pecharromán =

Spanish historian

- Born: 1955; Madrid
- Alma mater: Complutense University of Madrid
- Occupation: Historian, senior lecturer
- Employer: Complutense University of Madrid (1979–1987); National University of Distance Education (1987–)

Julio Gil Pecharromán (born 1955) is a Spanish historian, specialising in the political history of 20th-century Spain.

== Biography ==
Born in Madrid in 1955, he studied both History and Journalism at the Complutense University of Madrid (UCM). He earned a PhD in history from the UCM in 1983, reading a dissertation titled Renovación española, una alternativa monárquica a la Segunda República and supervised by Carlos Seco Serrano. The thesis, that dealt with the alfonsine authoritarian Renovación Española party, was re-published in 1985. A lecturer for 8 years at the UCM, Gil Pecharromán was appointed as senior lecturer of Contemporary History at the National University of Distance Education (UNED) in 1987.

== Works ==
- — (1985). Renovación española, una alternativa monárquica a la Segunda República.
- — (1994). Conservadores subversivos. La derecha autoritaria alfonsina (1913-1936). Madrid: Eudema.
- — (1995). La segunda república española (1931-1936). Madrid: Universidad Nacional de Educación a Distancia.
- — (1997). José Antonio Primo de Rivera. Retrato de un visionario. Madrid: Temas de Hoy.
- — (2000). Sobre España inmortal, solo Dios. José María Albiñana y el Partido Nacionalista Español (1930-1937).
- — (2005). Niceto Alcalá Zamora. Un liberal en la encrucijada. Madrid: Síntesis.
- — (2008). Con permiso de la autoridad. La España de Franco (1939-1975). Madrid: Temas de Hoy.
- — (2008). La política exterior del franquismo (1939-1975). Entre Hendaya y El Aaiún. Barcelona: Flor del Viento.
- — (2013). El Movimiento Nacional, 1937-1977. Del partido único a Alianza Popular. Barcelona: Planeta.
- — (2019). La estirpe del camaleón. Una historia política de la derecha en España 1937-2004. Taurus.
