= Antonio Goicoechea =

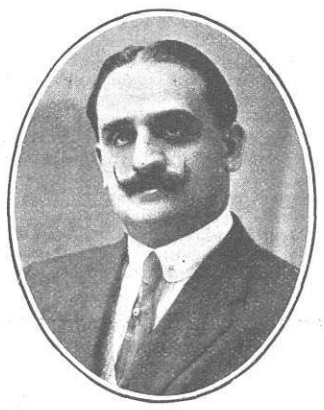

Procurator in the Cortes
- In office March 16, 1943 – April 5, 1952

Governor of the Bank of Spain
- In office 1938 – 1950
- Preceded by: Lluís Nicolau d'Olwer
- Succeeded by: Francisco de Cárdenas y de la Torre

Deputy of the Cortes for Cuenca
- In office November 24, 1933 – April 1, 1936

Member of the National Assembly
- In office October 10, 1927 – February 15, 1930

Deputy in the Cortes for Becerreá, Madrid, Puente del A. & Monforte
- In office 1909–1920

Minister of the Interior
- In office April 15, 1919 – July 20, 1919
- Preceded by: Amalio Gimeno
- Succeeded by: Manuel de Burgos y Mazo

Personal details
- Born: Antonio Goicoechea y Cosculluela; January 21, 1876 Barcelona, Spain
- Died: February 1, 1953 (aged 77) Madrid, Spanish State
- Party: Spanish Renovation
- Occupation: Lawyer
- Movement: Maurism

Antonio Goicoechea (21 January 1876, in Barcelona – 11 February 1953, in Madrid) was an Alfonsine monarchist politician and lawyer in Spain during the period of the Second Spanish Republic and the Spanish Civil War.

He started to become politically relevant when he became the leader of the Juventudes Mauristas, and he would later serve as Minister of the Interior from 15 April 1919 to 20 July 1919 in a Maura cabinet. He led the authoritarian Renovación Española political party.

Prior to the Civil War, Goicoechea in 1934 had negotiated along with the Carlists Antonio Lizarza Iribarren and Rafael de Olazábal y Eulate with the Italian dictator Benito Mussolini on a military agreement to guarantee Italian support of their movements if a civil war erupted in Spain. However, according to Lizarza, when the Civil War erupted in 1936, it had not been initiated by Goicoechea or other members of the agreement but by a group of army officers and so Goicoechea's agreement with Mussolini did not go forward. After Falange Española Tradicionalista y de las Juntas de Ofensiva Nacional Sindicalista emerged in 1937, Goicoechea dissolved Renovación Española and served as the 58th Governor of the Bank of Spain (from 1938 to 1950) and Procurador en Cortes (representative of the Francoist legislature).

== Bibliography ==
- González Cuevas, Pedro Carlos (2001). "Antonio Goicoechea. Político y doctrinario monárquico". Historia y política: Ideas, procesos y movimientos sociales (6): 161–190. ISSN 1575-0361.
