= Hispania. Revista Española de Historia =

Hispania
- Discipline: History
- Language: Spanish
- Edited by: Fernando García Sanz

Publication details
- History: 1940-present
- Publisher: Consejo Superior de Investigaciones Científicas, Instituto de Historia (Spain)
- Frequency: Triannual
- Open access: Yes
- License: CC BY 4.0

Standard abbreviations
- ISO 4: Hispania

Indexing
- ISSN: 0018-2141 (print); 1988-8368 (web)
- LCCN: 43040298
- OCLC no.: 978972948

Links
- Journal homepage; Online access; Online archive

Hispania, Revista Española de Historia is a triannual peer-reviewed open access academic journal published by the Instituto de Historia of the Consejo Superior de Investigaciones Científicas. The editor-in-chief is Fernando García Sanz (Instituto de Historia). It was established in 1940 and covers history, from the ancient to the modern periods.

== Abstracting and indexing ==
The journal is abstracted and indexed in the Arts and Humanities Citation Index, Current Contents/Arts & Humanities, and Scopus.
