= José Luis Rodríguez Jiménez =

Spanish historian

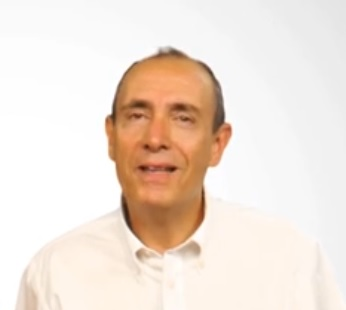
- Occupation: Historian, senior lecturer
- Employer: King Juan Carlos University

José Luis Rodríguez Jiménez (born 1961) is a Spanish historian, considered an expert in the history of right-wing extremism in Spain.

== Biography ==
Born in 1961 in Madrid, he earned a licentiate degree in history at the Complutense University of Madrid; he later obtained a PhD in the same centre in 1992 under the doctoral supervision of Antonio Fernández García reading a thesis dealing with the positions espoused by the Spanish far-right and the further evolution it experienced during the late francoist period and the Spanish transition to democracy. (Note: The thesis was later re-published by the CSIC in 1994 under the title Reaccionarios y golpistas. La extrema derecha en España: del tardofranquismo a la consolidación de la democracia (1967–1982).) He is professor of Contemporary History at the King Juan Carlos University (URJC).

== Works ==
- — (1994). Reaccionarios y golpistas. La extrema derecha en España: del tardofranquismo a la consolidación de la democracia (1967–1982). Madrid: Consejo Superior de Investigaciones Científicas.
- — (1998). ¿Nuevos fascismos? Extrema derecha y neofascismo en Europa y Estados Unidos. Barcelona: Editorial Península.
- — (2000). Historia de Falange Española de las JONS. Madrid: Alianza Editorial.
- — (2005). Franco. Historia de un conspirador. Madrid: Oberon.
- — (2007). De héroes e indeseables. La División Azul. Madrid: Espasa-Calpe.
- — (2013). Salvando vidas en el delta del Mekong: la primera misión en el exterior de la sanidad militar española: Vietnam del sur, 1966–1971. Ministerio de Defensa.
- — (2015). Agonía, traición, huida. El final del Sáhara español. Barcelona: Crítica.
