= Assassination of José Calvo Sotelo =

1936 killing of Spanish monarchist leader

- Part of the prelude to the Spanish Civil War
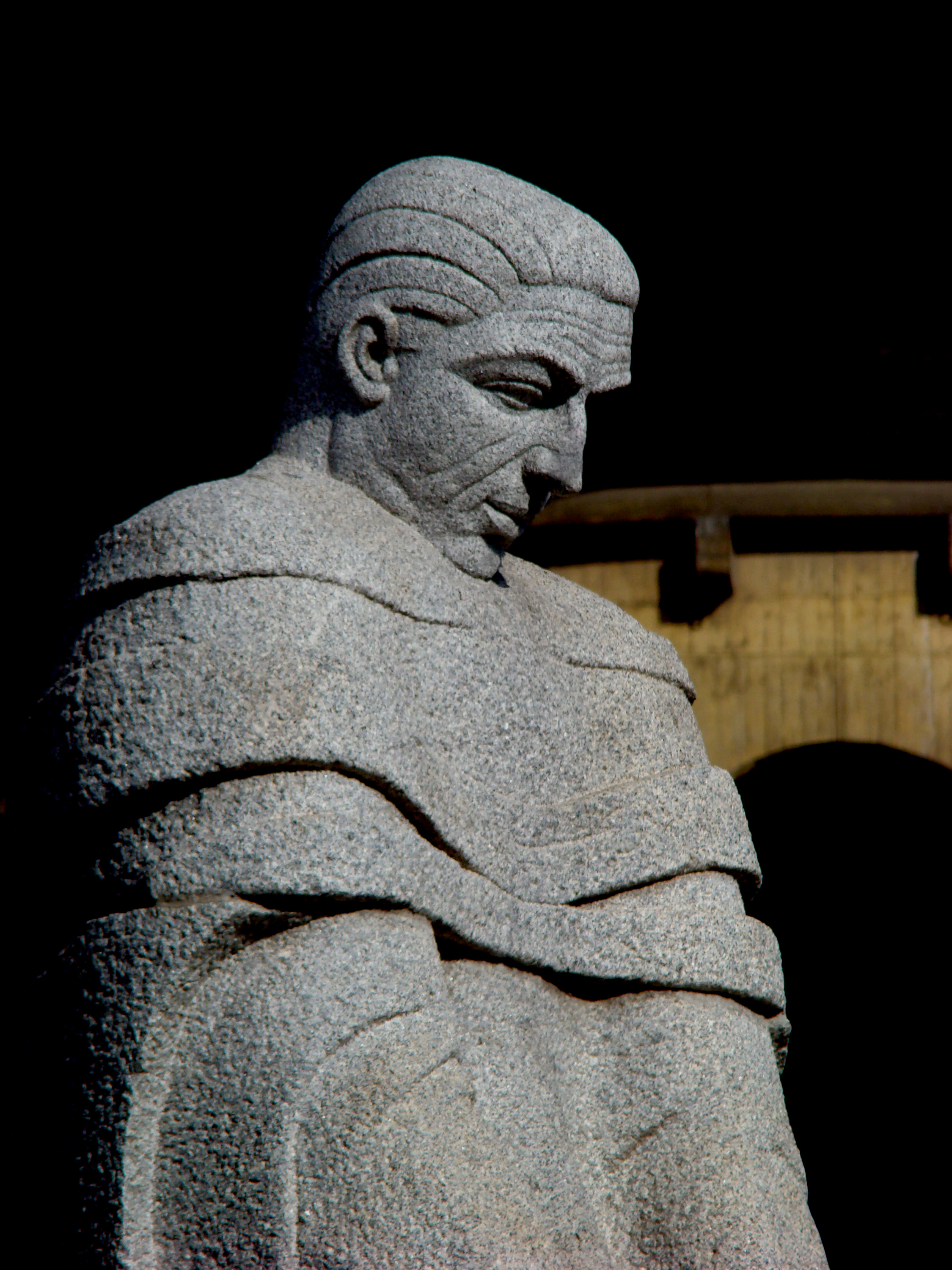
- A sculptural portrait of Calvo Sotelo in the monument dedicated to him erected by the Franco dictatorship in 1960 in the Plaza de Castilla in Madrid
- Location: Madrid, Spanish Republic
- Date: 13 July 1936
- Target: José Calvo Sotelo
- Attack type: Assassination by shooting
- Deaths: 1 (Calvo Sotelo)
- Perpetrator: Cuerpo de Seguridad y Asalto
- Assailant: Luis Cuenca Estevas
- Motive: Assassination of José Castillo

The assassination of José Calvo Sotelo took place in Madrid, Spain, in the early hours of Monday, 13 July 1936, during the Second Spanish Republic. A group comprising Assault Guards and socialist militia members, led by a Civil Guard captain in civilian clothes, arrived at opposition leader José Calvo Sotelo's home under the pretext of escorting him to the General Directorate of Security (Dirección General de Seguridad, DGS). During the journey, socialist militant Luis Cuenca Estevas shot him twice in the back of the head and later delivered the body to the Almudena Cemetery morgue. The murder was in retaliation for the killing of the Assault Guard officer José Castillo, a Socialist sympathizer and militia trainer, earlier that day. Calvo Sotelo, a prominent monarchist, became the most significant and final high-profile victim of the political violence that surged following the Popular Front's victory in the February 1936 elections, which resulted in 384 deaths (111 by leftists, 122 by rightists—61 by Falangists—and 84 by security forces).

The assassination caused widespread shock, not only due to Calvo Sotelo’s political stature but also because the perpetrators included state security personnel and Socialist militants, one of whom was the bodyguard of PSOE leader Indalecio Prieto. Civil Guard Captain Condés, who led the group, was also linked to the PSOE. The Popular Front government, under Prime Minister Santiago Casares Quiroga and President Manuel Azaña, did not respond decisively, further intensifying public outrage.

The event accelerated the military conspiracy against the Republic, which had been developing under General Mola since April. Calvo Sotelo’s murder swayed many hesitant officers to join the planned uprising, which began four days later with the failed coup of 17 July 1936, sparking the Spanish Civil War. Following the Nationalist victory, the Franco regime declared Calvo Sotelo a “protomartyr” of the so-called "Liberation Crusade". Monuments were erected in his honor, including a major one in Madrid’s Plaza de Castilla, inaugurated by Franco in 1960. Streets and squares across Spain bore his name, and a state-owned enterprise established in 1942 was named after him.

Socialist Julián Zugazagoitia later wrote that Calvo Sotelo had become the leading civilian figure of the monarchist cause, admired for his intellect and leadership, and trusted by monarchists and much of the conservative CEDA bloc.

== Background ==
José Calvo Sotelo emerged as a leading figure of the anti-Republican Right, particularly after the electoral defeat of José María Gil-Robles' "possibilist" strategy in February 1936, which, paradoxically, reinforced Calvo Sotelo’s more radical stance. His anti-democratic ideology was openly expressed. During the 1933 general election campaign, he advocated for the end of parliamentary democracy, predicting that the elected legislature would be "the last with universal suffrage for many years". In the 1936 campaign, he again urged that the elections be the last, denouncing universal suffrage as ineffective and proposing a corporative and authoritarian state as the solution to Spain’s crisis.

Calvo Sotelo was described by Republican deputy Mariano Ansó as the Republic’s "most distinguished enemy". ABC editor Luis de Galinsoga recalled his unwavering opposition to the Republic, which he had rejected from its inception. Calvo Sotelo was involved in the 1936 coup conspiracy from its early stages and was in contact with General Mola, to whom he offered his services. He frequently called for military intervention to end the Popular Front government's "anarchy".

Monarchist conspirators saw Calvo Sotelo as a key political figure in the regime they intended to establish. Pedro Sainz Rodríguez believed he would lead the transformation of the uprising into a restructured state, while Eduardo Aunós, a former minister like Calvo Sotelo under Primo de Rivera, envisioned him at the side of the future leader, lending his intellect and zeal.

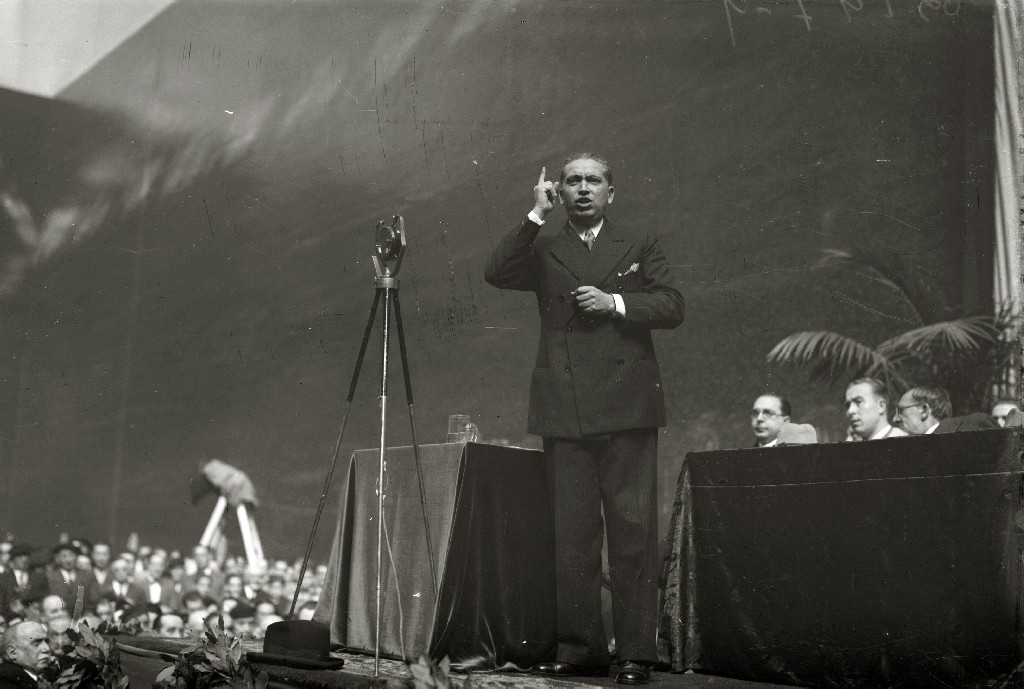
José Calvo Sotelo at a rally in San Sebastián (1935). He was a leader of the anti-republican right wing and the main civilian promoter of the coup conspiracy that led to the coup d'état of July 1936.

In the Cortes, Calvo Sotelo’s speeches provoked hostility from Popular Front deputies. On April 15, he detailed recent acts of violence—reporting 74 deaths, 345 injuries, and 106 attacks on religious buildings, including the burning of San Luis Obispo church near the Ministry of the Interior. His statements were met with accusations of complicity in Falangist violence and reminders of the repression in Asturias. Prominent deputies, including Dolores Ibárruri and Margarita Nelken, vocally challenged him, sometimes with threats and insults.

Hostility escalated in subsequent sessions. On May 6, Nelken declared, "the executioners have no right to speak". On May 19, an exchange with Socialist deputy Bruno Alonso González turned into a personal confrontation, involving insults and threats, eventually requiring intervention by the president of the Cortes.

In the session of June 16—considered one of the most dramatic in the Republic’s history—Calvo Sotelo again denounced widespread disorder and defended an authoritarian corporative model. He openly declared himself a Fascist: "If that is the Fascist State, I [...] declare myself a Fascist". He also called for potential military action against anarchy, prompting sharp protests from the left and a warning from Prime Minister Santiago Casares Quiroga, who declared he would hold Calvo Sotelo responsible for any future uprising. Calvo Sotelo accepted the warning defiantly, comparing Santiago Casares Quiroga to figures like Kerenski and Károlyi, and asserting it was better "to die with glory than to live with vilification".

On July 1, 1936, the final plenary session of the Cortes before the outbreak of the Spanish Civil War took place, marked by intense conflict, frequent interruptions, and heated exchanges. The most serious incident occurred following José Calvo Sotelo's intervention—routinely interrupted—when Socialist deputy Ángel Galarza, a member of the Caballerist faction, issued a barely veiled threat. Reacting to what he perceived as fascist rhetoric—such as Calvo Sotelo’s advocacy for a corporate state and his denunciation of political parties as “chlorotic confraternities”—Galarza declared: “I find everything justified, even personal attacks". Though these words were omitted from the official Journal of Sessions by order of the President of the Chamber, they were reported in the press.

A journalist present transcribed Galarza's speech as justifying violence against those seeking to impose fascism through force. The president of the Cortes, Diego Martínez Barrio, promptly rebuked him: “Violence, Mr. Galarza, is not legitimate at any time or in any place. [...] From Parliament, violence cannot be advised.” Galarza accepted the decision but warned that the public would ultimately judge the legitimacy of violence.

Some historians argue that speeches by Calvo Sotelo and Gil-Robles were part of a right-wing campaign to delegitimize the Republic and justify a coup. These historians claim the right constructed a narrative of chaos and collapse, amplified by sympathetic media. Eduardo González Calleja contends that “the Civil War was declared in Parliament before it was declared in the streets,” with Calvo Sotelo playing a leading role through his provocative rhetoric. José Luis Martín Ramos similarly emphasizes his rejection of the Republic’s legitimacy, citing statements that the Constitution of 1931 and parliamentary regime had brought economic and social disorder. Historians such as Julio Aróstegui and Paul Preston share this assessment.

Italian historian Gabriele Ranzato, who does not support the agitation campaign thesis, nonetheless identifies Calvo Sotelo as a key figure responsible for escalating political violence, due to his repeated appeals for military intervention and open hostility to democratic principles. Ranzato calls him “the most prominent figure” in the anti-democratic movement, whose long-standing opposition to the Republic provoked both political enmity and popular hatred.

Calvo Sotelo himself believed his life was in danger. As early as April 15, he declared in the Cortes that he was on “blacklists". Following a sharp exchange with Prime Minister Santiago Casares Quiroga on June 16, he told ABC editor Luis de Galinsoga that he felt his death was imminent and requested to be alerted to any incidents that might trigger reprisals. He sometimes avoided sleeping at home and grew distrustful of his police escort. (Note: Rodolfo Serrano, one of Calvo Sotelo's two police escorts, had told on July 7 to the traditionalist deputy Joaquín Bau, a friend of Calvo Sotelo, that the General Directorate of Security had informed them that their mission was not to protect the deputies, but to report on their steps and that if an attack took place their duty was not to detain the aggressors and, even, that if it took place in an unpopulated area they should collaborate with them (Thomas, pp. 231-233; Romero, pp. 181-182; Bullón de Mendoza, pp. 663-664). Joaquín Bau contacted the Minister of the Interior Juan Moles and also Calvo Sotelo himself —who also spoke about the matter with Gil-Robles and the latter encouraged him to change his escort-—. Moles denied that any such order had been given to the policemen and did not object to change the escort agents and put those chosen by Calvo Sotelo —"I did not want there to be any misunderstandings of any kind in this matter", declared Moles in the Cortes after the assassination—(Gibson, pp. 78-79). However, according to Bullón de Mendoza (p. 666), the new agents assigned to him were not chosen by him, but "were complete strangers to the Tudenses politician".) Concerned associates also feared for his safety; on July 10, just three days before his assassination, Joaquín Bau gifted him a Buick with plans to have it armored.

Assault Guard Lieutenant José del Castillo, closely aligned with the Socialist militias he helped train, also feared assassination—particularly after Carlos Faraudo was killed by Falangist gunmen on May 8. Both Castillo and Faraudo had appeared on a list, allegedly created by the clandestine anti-Republican military group UME, targeting Socialist officers for assassination. In response to Faraudo’s murder, Artillery Captain Urbano Orad de la Torre, also on the list, warned the UME that further attacks would provoke retaliation—potentially against politicians rather than military officers.

At Faraudo’s funeral, Lieutenant Colonel Julio Mangada, visibly moved, urged stronger action by the government against fascist provocations and threatened reprisals if it failed to act. Among the mourners was Captain Federico Escofet, who overheard a young man—Captain Fernando Condés—advocating retaliation against a prominent right-wing leader. Two months later, Condés would lead the group that assassinated Calvo Sotelo.

== Motive and prelude ==
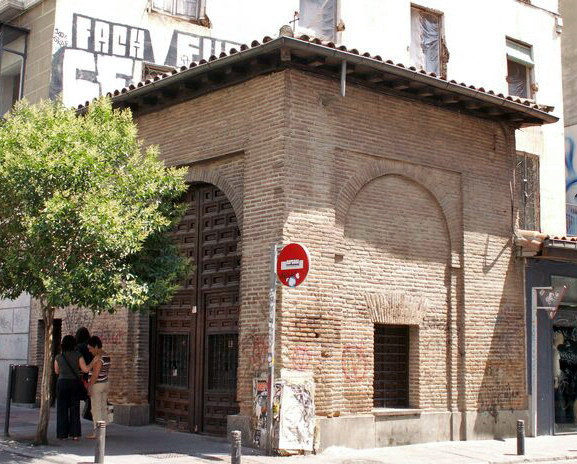
Humilladero de Nuestra Señora de la Soledad

On the night of Sunday, July 12, 1936, Lieutenant José del Castillo of the Assault Guard—a committed Socialist and member of the UMRA—was assassinated on a central street in Madrid. While the perpetrators remain unidentified, historians generally agree the killing was carried out by right-wing extremists and formed part of a cycle of political violence and reprisals. Castillo’s murder provoked a strong reaction among his colleagues at the Pontejos Barracks, particularly Captain Eduardo Cuevas de la Peña and Lieutenant Alfonso Barbeta, both visibly agitated. One of them reportedly threw his cap at the feet of the Director General of Security, José Alonso Mallol, who responded only by calling for calm. Castillo’s funeral chapel was set up in the General Directorate of Security, attended by his family, fellow Assault Guards, and members of the socialist militia group "La Motorizada," which he had helped train. Among them were Enrique Puente, Santiago Garcés, and Luis Cuenca—a close friend of Castillo and experienced marksman who had occasionally served as Indalecio Prieto’s escort.

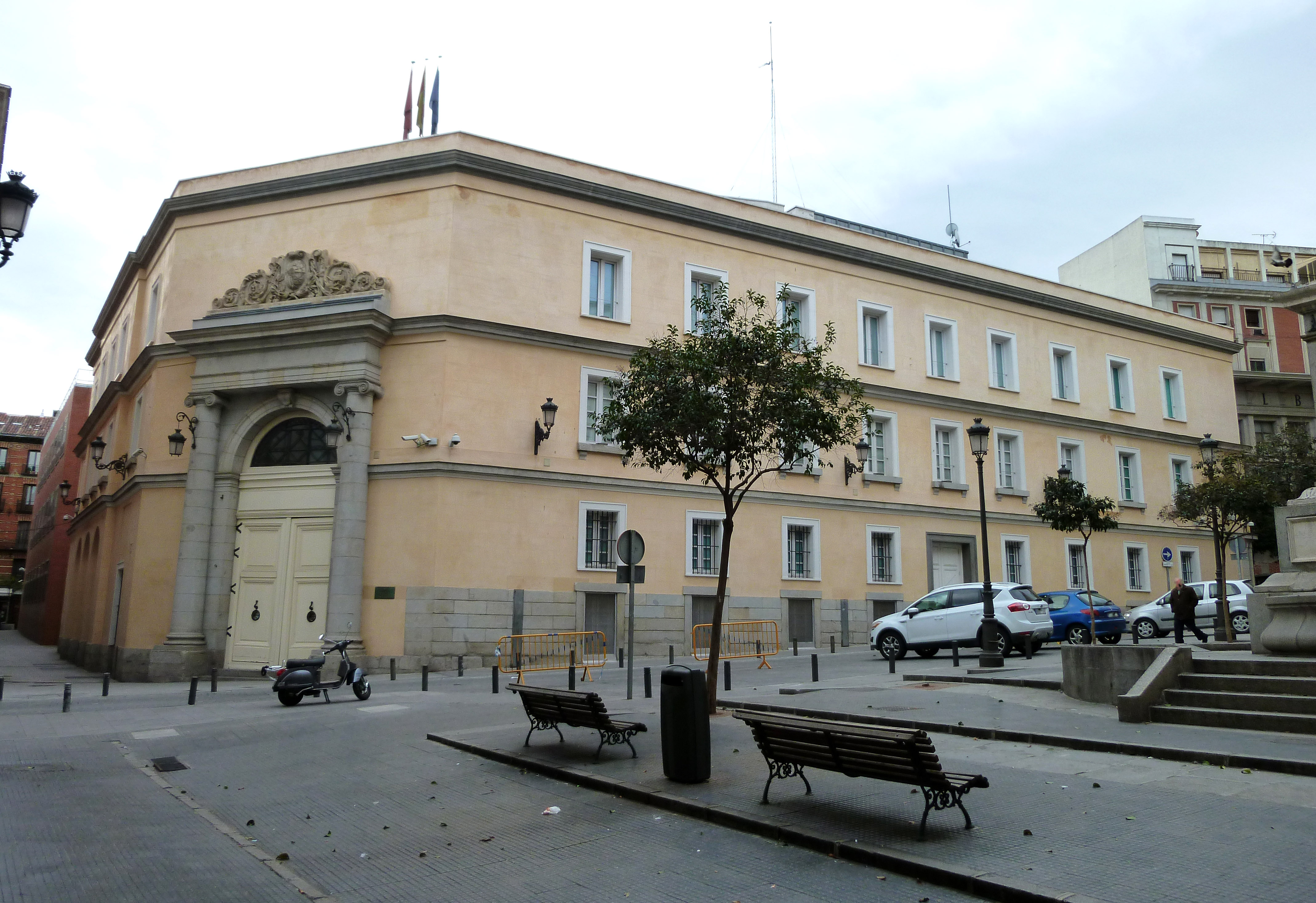
Former Pontejos barracks located in the Plaza de Pontejos, just behind the Puerta del Sol. The group of the Assault Guard of Pontejos, one of the four groups that existed in Madrid, was under the orders of commander Ricardo Burillo. It consisted of four companies. Lieutenant Castillo belonged to the 2nd, called Specialties. His captain was Antonio Moreno Navarro and the other lieutenant of the company was Alfonso Barbeta.

Around midnight, Assault Guards, both in uniform and civilian clothes, gathered at Pontejos Barracks, joined by socialist militiamen and Civil Guard Captain Fernando Condés, another friend and UMRA member. The mood was one of outrage. Calls for retaliation echoed through the barracks, with accusations that the government was failing to protect left-wing officers and activists. Lieutenant Barbeta, returning from the medical center, addressed Castillo’s company, reportedly declaring the murder must not go unpunished—though he later claimed his intent was to calm the troops. He also instructed Corporal Emilio Colón Parda to discreetly select guards for a secret mission.

A group of officers, including Captain Antonio Moreno, subsequently met with Interior Minister Juan Moles to demand immediate reprisals against those they believed responsible—primarily Falangist gunmen. They secured a list of suspected Falangists to be arrested. According to Manuel Tagüeña, a socialist militia member present that night, additional names were added to the list by a fellow militiaman, Francisco Ordóñez, who had obtained files from a recently vacated Falange headquarters. Historian Stanley G. Payne has written—without documentary evidence—that Assault Guard officers also added prominent right-wing leaders to the list, including Antonio Goicoechea, José María Gil-Robles, and José Calvo Sotelo, the latter two being parliamentary deputies with immunity. According to historian Gabriel Jackson, Castillo’s comrades sought "a spectacular act of revenge," acting independently of party leadership and without regard for the political consequences. They resolved to assassinate a prominent right-wing figure.

== Assassination ==
Account of the crime by Julián Zugazagoitia, according to what Calvo Sotelo's assassin told him

In the street, still silent and dark at night, a van of Assault Guards was waiting. They got the conspirators on to the car and forced Calvo Sotelo to get in. The van started up. Calvo Sotelo did not utter a word of complaint or protest. Was he praying? On the bench in his back, two men carried their guns. One of them nudged his companion, the latter raised his gun, placed it at Calvo Sotelo's head and fired twice. Death must have been instantaneous.

The dead man's head bent over his chest and the body, in a swerve of the vehicle, leaned against the guard on the right. As everything was foreseen, the driver took the direction of the cemetery and there, in the morgue, they left the body of the victim, where a few hours later it had to be discovered by his friends, disturbed with the loss that deprived them, at the same time, of an esteemed person and of a leader. As impressive as the story my interlocutor had told me was, I was even more impressed, without knowing why, by the clarification with which he ended the interview:

—Before deciding to execute the reprisal we were hesitating whether to go to Gil-Robles' or Calvo Sotelo's house. We decided on the latter with the purpose of returning for Gil-Robles if we ended up soon at Calvo Sotelo's house.

After my confidant had left, a feeling of disgust and uneasiness came over my body.

In the early hours of July 13, 1936, a group of Assault Guards and socialist militiamen, organized from the Pontejos barracks in Madrid, prepared to carry out arrests in response to the murder of Lieutenant José del Castillo the previous evening. Lieutenant Alfredo León Lupión supervised the deployment of several vans for this purpose, including van number 17. The operation’s targets were Falangists and suspected right-wing gunmen, selected from lists compiled with the assistance of socialist militiaman Manuel Tagüeña, who prioritized names of those who paid the highest Falange dues or were listed as workers—suspecting them of being hired gunmen. Van 17 was composed of approximately ten Assault Guards—only four of whom are known by name—alongside several civilians: Luis Cuenca and Santiago Garcés of the socialist militia "La Motorizada", and Francisco Ordóñez and Federico Coello, both close to the caballerist faction. (Note: Many years later Lieutenant León Lupión told Ian Gibson that the guards were not "chosen, far from it"; "whoever wanted" got into the van. "There the only ones there who were, in any case, chosen and in agreement with him [with Condés] were a few boys from the Socialist Youth, all of them dressed in civilian clothes, and an Assault guard, also in civilian clothes, José del Rey,... [who] was from the Pacífico group, not from Pontejos. He was also a socialist. I gave Condés a list of three or four people... And I never saw Fernando Condés again" (Gibson (1982, p. 109).) Also present was Assault Guard José del Rey Hernández, in civilian clothes, and Civil Guard Captain Fernando Condés, who, though not formally assigned to the operation and dressed in civilian clothes, assumed command of the group—an irregularity noted by several historians.

There are conflicting accounts regarding the group’s route. Some, including Hugh Thomas and Gabriel Jackson, suggest the group first attempted to locate other right-wing leaders such as Antonio Goicoechea and José María Gil-Robles, but ultimately went to the home of José Calvo Sotelo at 89 Velázquez Street. Other sources, such as Luis Romero and Alfonso Bullón de Mendoza, write that the group headed directly to Calvo Sotelo’s residence. The timing of their arrival also varies by source, generally estimated between 2:00 and 3:00 a.m.

In Upon arrival, the group presented themselves to the two police officers stationed at the building entrance. Captain Condés showed his Civil Guard credentials, and the group was allowed entry. Inside the home were Calvo Sotelo, his wife Enriqueta Grondona, their four children, domestic staff, and a French governess. (Note: The account he wrote for Luis Romero, which Alfonso Bullón de Mendoza reproduces in its entirety (pp. 677-681), is the fundamental source for knowing what happened in Calvo Sotelo's home. Although he was not an eyewitness to the events (since he did not wake up), he gathered what he heard his mother and the other people in the house say.) Initially, the maid and cook refused to open the door, but Calvo Sotelo, after checking with the guards outside and seeing the official vehicle, eventually opened it himself.

Once inside, the group conducted a perfunctory search. Some members ransacked the office, tore out a phone line, and threw a monarchist flag to the floor. Condés then informed Calvo Sotelo he was being taken to the General Directorate of Security. Calvo Sotelo protested, invoking his parliamentary immunity and the illegality of the arrest, but was denied the opportunity to make a phone call. He reluctantly prepared a small travel bag and reassured his distraught wife, promising to return soon. Before leaving, he kissed his children—only his eldest daughter had woken up—and told his wife, ominously, “unless these gentlemen take me away to give me four shots." Historians agree that Calvo Sotelo suspected he might be killed. Gabriel Jackson described him as a man prepared for martyrdom; Ian Gibson emphasized his composure and courage, suggesting that although he likely sensed the danger, he refrained from resisting in order to spare his family.

Shortly after being taken from his home, José Calvo Sotelo was escorted down the stairs of his residence by the French governess, speaking to her in French. This irritated one of the guards, who ordered him to speak in Spanish. Calvo Sotelo reportedly asked her to warn either his brothers Luis and Joaquín or, as Ian Gibson suggests, his close associates Andrés Amado and Arturo Salgado Biempica. He explicitly said not to inform his father, who was bedridden with a stomach ulcer. On the way out, he informed the doorman: “They are taking me under arrest. I have not been able to talk on the phone." (Note: "The vans, or 'platforms', as they used to be called, of Assault, were open, long and powerful vehicles, of Hispano-Suiza make. They had four compartments and six benches, with numerous doors that facilitated the rapid intervention of their occupants in those street disturbances in whose control they were destined. The 'platforms' could easily carry twenty men or more." (Gibson (1982, p. 123)) He was placed in van number 17, seated in the third row, facing forward, between two Assault Guards (one of whom was Aniceto Castro Piñeira). The bench in front of him was deliberately left vacant. Luis Cuenca of the socialist militia "La Motorizada" was seated in the back. Captain Fernando Condés took the front passenger seat beside the driver, with José del Rey beside him.

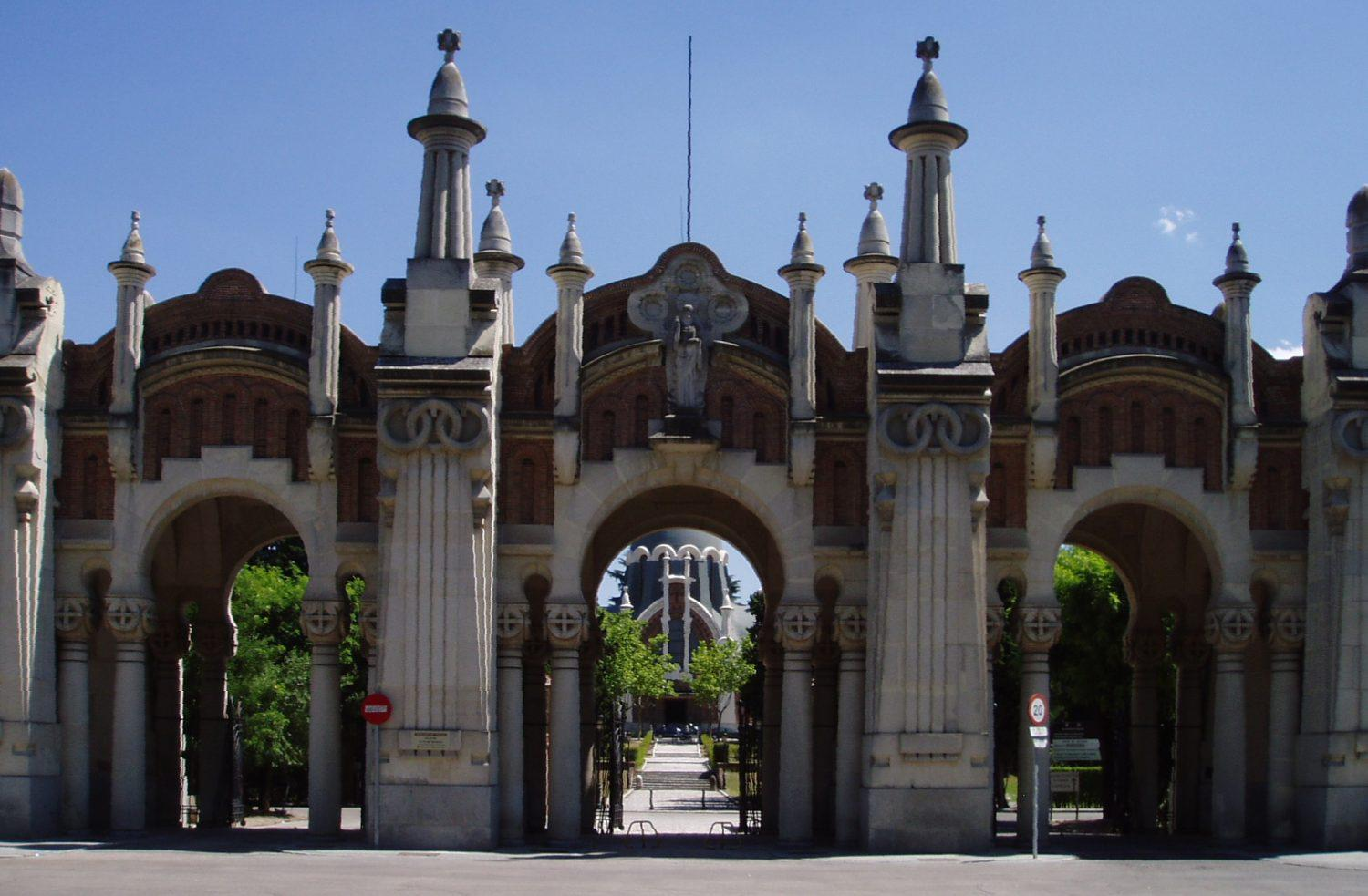
Entrance arches of the cemetery of the East of Madrid. It was in the cemetery's morgue where his assassins abandoned the lifeless body of Calvo Sotelo.

As the van traveled down Alcalá Street and turned onto Ayala Street, Cuenca pulled out a pistol and shot Calvo Sotelo twice in the back of the head, killing him instantly. His body collapsed between the seats. Captain Condés made no comment, nor did he order the vehicle to stop. Instead, he instructed the driver to proceed to the Cementerio del Este. One of the guards later testified that upon hearing the shots, Condés and Del Rey exchanged knowing glances and smiled—an assertion Del Rey denied before Francoist judges. Approaching Alcalá Street, the van encountered a parked car that appeared to be waiting. Inside were Assault Lieutenants Alfonso Barbeta and Máximo Moreno, both friends of the murdered Lieutenant Castillo, along with three other individuals. The two groups exchanged greetings. The presence of this second car has led historians like Luis Romero to speculate whether it was part of a coordinated plan—possibly having first sought out José María Gil-Robles, then turning to ensure the "operation" against Calvo Sotelo had been completed.

The van reached the gates of the East Cemetery around 4:00 a.m. Two gravediggers on duty, Esteban Fernández Sánchez and Daniel Tejero Cabello, opened the gates after recognizing the official vehicle. (Note: Years later some authors affirmed that the assassins counted on the complicity of the gravediggers to get rid of the corpse throwing it in the common grave or putting it in a niche, but that these had become drunk and had been substituted by the two who received them who knew nothing of the matter. This was the version maintained by Franco's historiography for forty years (for example, General Felipe Acedo Colunga in his biography of Calvo Sotelo). Luis Romero (pg. 204) gives little credibility to the assumption because "in the summary I have not found any data, not even evidence to confirm it. Nor does it seem possible that between the murder of Castillo, the decision to kill Calvo Sotelo and the time when the remains were taken to the cemetery, there was time to hatch the plan, to get complicity, to get the gravediggers drunk, to relieve them, etc. It is possible that in saying this it is intended to show that the murder had been premeditated for days." Ian Gibson (pp. 131-132) also considers this version "absolutely implausible, for many reasons". Among others, because "there were never relays [of the gravediggers] at night," nor were there any burials. Nor was there a mass grave before the war. Gibson concludes: "The "criminal complicity" of some gravediggers with the assassins of Calvo Sotelo was invented by the Francoists to reinforce their thesis that the death of the congressman was planned by the authorities of the Popular Front". Gibson also points out that José María Gil-Robles in his memoirs also included this "far-fetched" version.) Captain Condés told them they were transporting an “undocumented corpse.” The body was placed on the floor of the morgue next to a marble slab. The van then departed. Later testimony by Fernández Sánchez confirmed he found the situation highly unusual but had no idea the victim was Calvo Sotelo.

According to historian Luis Romero, upon returning to the Pontejos Barracks, the participants—Condés, Cuenca, Del Rey, and others—gathered in the office of Major Ricardo Burillo, where they were joined by Captain Antonio Moreno, Lieutenants Barbeta and León Lupión, and Lieutenant Máximo Moreno. Toward dawn, Lieutenant Colonel Sánchez Plaza, commander of the Madrid Assault Guard, also arrived. However, Ian Gibson disputes this timeline. He states that Ricardo Burillo was not at Pontejos that night, having been on duty at the General Directorate of Security (DGS). According to Burillo’s own later testimony—considered credible by Gibson—he only went to Pontejos around 7:00 a.m., accompanied by Sánchez Plaza, after learning of the van’s unsanctioned departure.

Regardless of the exact sequence, it is generally agreed that Captain Condés ordered the guards to remain silent and instructed driver Orencio Bayo to clean the blood from the van—an attempt to erase evidence of what had occurred.

== Aftermath ==
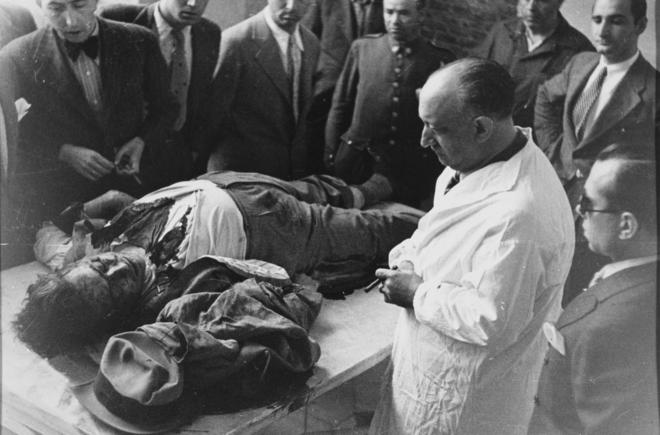
The body of José Calvo Sotelo

=== Discovery of Calvo Sotelo's corpse ===
Immediately after José Calvo Sotelo was taken from his home, his wife, Enriqueta Grondona, began to alert friends and political allies. At the same time, the French governess followed Calvo Sotelo’s request and warned his brothers. One of the first to arrive, accompanied by his wife, was Arturo Salgado Biempica, Calvo Sotelo's close friend and secretary. After nearly an hour without news, Enriqueta decided to call the General Director of Security, José Alonso Mallol. His response was curt: he claimed to know nothing about Calvo Sotelo’s whereabouts and denied having issued any order for his arrest or for a search of his home. According to historian Ian Gibson, it was actually the two policemen stationed at the front of the building who first called Mallol. Calvo Sotelo’s wife phoned later. Gibson also maintains that the first official contacted was Commander Ricardo Burillo, head of the Pontejos Assault Guard group, who was reportedly on duty that night at the General Directorate of Security. Gibson’s interpretation relies on Burillo’s 1940 testimony before Francoist judges and a confession made to fellow prisoner Rafael Sánchez Guerra shortly before Burillo’s execution, in which he denied any role in planning the assassination.

Soon, Calvo Sotelo’s brothers Luis and Joaquín, along with Arturo Salgado and deputy Andrés Amado, arrived at the family home. They tried to obtain information from the General Directorate of Security but were not received by Mallol. Instead, his secretary merely confirmed that a search had been ordered to locate the deputy. The group then went to the Ministry of the Interior at Puerta del Sol, accompanied by Pedro Sainz Rodríguez, a deputy from the Spanish Renovation party. It was already dawn. They were received by Undersecretary Bibiano Fernández Osorio y Tafall, who initially claimed to have no knowledge of an arrest. However, at one point he admitted that bloodstains had been found in a van belonging to the Assault Guard and that an investigation was underway. According to Amado’s later testimony before Francoist judges, the group demanded that the van’s occupants be arrested immediately. Osorio allegedly responded that it was not possible because the guards had already been assigned to diplomatic posts—a claim that Gibson views with skepticism, noting that Amado was motivated to prove official complicity in his friend’s death.

At around 5:00 a.m., monarchist deputy Fernando Suárez de Tangil, Count of Vallellano, phoned the President of the Cortes, Diego Martínez Barrio, to report Calvo Sotelo’s disappearance. However, it was Martínez Barrio’s wife who took the message, not wanting to wake him after a late return from a trip. Tangil also attempted, unsuccessfully, to contact Vice President Luis Jiménez de Asúa. (Note: This is the version given by the newspapers ABC and Informaciones, which is the one followed by Luis Romero. The newspaper Ya published that Martínez Barrio arrived from Valencia at 9 o'clock in the morning and that as soon as he heard the news of Calvo Sotelo's kidnapping he called the Count of Vallellano in consternation. Ian Gibson considers this second version more reliable and it is the one that follows (Gibson (1982, p. 152) (Romero (1982, p. 216)) In his memoirs, Tangil recounts a furious call with Alonso Mallol, who reportedly hinted that Calvo Sotelo may have already been killed. Tangil retorted that the government had committed “an official assassination,” prompting Mallol to threaten his arrest. Tangil replied defiantly that he would not be "taken like Calvo,” and armed himself with pistols in anticipation.

Upon waking, Martínez Barrio was deeply disturbed. He immediately called the Count of Vallellano and pledged his support: “Count me as one more deputy of your minority, at your unlimited disposal… I will inform you from hour to hour… I am not moving from here.” Vallellano’s response was grim: “My friend should not be looked for on the roads, but in the sewers of the Manzanares—or similar places—where he has already been a corpse for some hours". Martínez Barrio then contacted Minister of the Interior Juan Moles, who denied government involvement and promised to intensify the search. Martínez Barrio followed up with a formal note to Prime Minister Casares Quiroga, reminding him that under Article 56 of the Constitution, parliamentary immunity protected deputies from arrest without proper legal grounds. Deputy Geminiano Carrascal also telephoned CEDA leader José María Gil-Robles, who was vacationing in Biarritz, to report the kidnapping. Gil-Robles immediately began his return journey to Madrid.

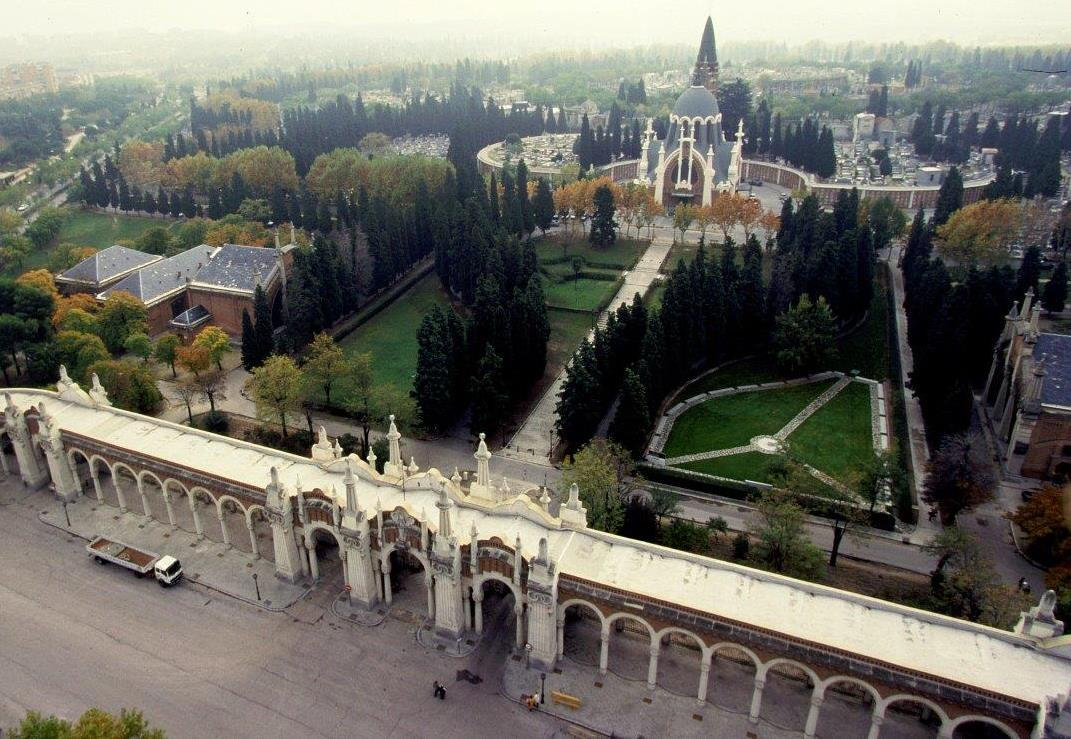
Aerial view of the Almudena cemetery, where the body of Calvo Sotelo was found on Monday morning, July 13, and where the funeral and burial took place on Tuesday afternoon, July 14

Around 9:00 a.m., the director of the East cemetery informed the City Council of Madrid that an unidentified corpse had been delivered at dawn by a detachment of Assault Guards. Mayor Pedro Rico, already aware of Calvo Sotelo’s disappearance, dispatched councilors Aurelio Regúlez and Isidro Broceta (or possibly Buceta) to investigate. The cemetery director also alerted the General Directorate of Security. Commissioner Aparicio was promptly sent by Alonso Mallol to the site. Upon arrival, the councilors confirmed that the body was indeed Calvo Sotelo’s and reported this to the mayor, who then phoned Mallol, saying with a visibly shaken voice that “the missing person” had been found—without naming him directly. Commissioner Aparicio corroborated the identification, and Mallol ordered the Civil Guard (rather than the Assault Guard) to secure the area to avoid further tensions. The government, then in session, was informed immediately. Unaware that the body had been identified, Calvo Sotelo’s brothers, brother-in-law Paco Grondona, and monarchist deputies Andrés Amado and Pedro Sainz Rodríguez arrived at the cemetery. A growing number of journalists followed, including Santos Alcocer from the Catholic newspaper Ya, (Note: In a book published years later, journalist Santos Alcocer stated that he was the first to arrive at the morgue and recognize the corpse. He was accompanied by the photojournalist Santos Yubero, but the photographs he took were not published and were eventually lost. This is the version that Alfonso Bullón de Mendoza (page 685). Luis Romero warns, for his part, that he has not been able to verify the veracity of Alcocer's account nor has he found other testimony to confirm it. Romero adds (p. 213): "the first identification of the mortal remains, as much in the press as in the books, is attributed to different people exclusively, and it is impossible that this happened. In a short period of time there were several people who identified the corpse and perhaps some were unaware that others had just done it".) along with other prominent right-wing figures.

The monarchist deputies requested that the funeral chapel be held either in the building of the Cortes or, failing that, in the Academy of Jurisprudence, of which Calvo Sotelo was president. The government refused. That evening, Martínez Barrio informed the press of the decision, citing fears that even with precautions, the funeral could be used to stir unrest. As a result, the mortuary chamber was installed in the East Cemetery morgue, about 200 meters from the Calvo family mausoleum—the same place where the body had been discovered. Martínez Barrio also informed journalists that, according to government sources, the cause of death was gunfire, countering earlier rumors of stabbing. The government further decided to prohibit Calvo Sotelo’s family and friends from holding a night vigil, a move that deeply offended the political right. The body would not be exposed to the public until 11:00 a.m. on Tuesday, July 14, after the autopsy had been completed.

=== Perpetrators and judicial investigation ===
According to the Socialist leader Julián Zugazagoitia, just hours after the assassination of José Calvo Sotelo, a man arrived at his home at eight in the morning on Monday, July 13—about four hours after the killing. Although Zugazagoitia never named the visitor in his account, some historians believe it was Luis Cuenca, the man who had fired the fatal shots. Zugazagoitia, then director of El Socialista (the official newspaper of the PSOE) and a deputy aligned with the prietista faction, described the man as having a worn, sleepless expression. While avoiding direct identification, he wrote, “Not many days later he was to lose his life in the Guadarrama pigsties,” referring to Cuenca’s later death during the Civil War. Zugazagoitia admitted being both curious and fearful during the conversation. “I had the intimate conviction that he had participated in [the crime], without being able to guess to what degree,” he wrote. Upon being told that Calvo Sotelo had been assassinated, Zugazagoitia declared, “That attack is war". He immediately phoned Indalecio Prieto, who was in Bilbao, urging him to return to Madrid on the first available train.

Around the same time, Captain Fernando Condés, who had led the group that abducted Calvo Sotelo, reportedly arrived at PSOE headquarters on Carranza Street. According to Socialist Juan Simeón Vidarte, Condés asked to speak with Prieto or Ramón Lamoneda; when told neither was present, a call was made to Vidarte’s home. Upon arrival, Vidarte found Condés pale, red-eyed, and visibly shaken. "Something terrible. Last night we killed Calvo Sotelo," Condés confessed. He insisted that the group had intended only to kidnap the monarchist leader, possibly to use him as a hostage alongside José María Gil-Robles and Antonio Goicoechea. However, he also rationalized the act by asking: "Was Calvo Sotelo's life worth more than those of Faraudo and Castillo, or any of the comrades the Falangists are assassinating". Vidarte rejected the justification outright and told Condés that he would not defend him if he were arrested: “That murder is going to be used against the Government and the Popular Front. It has been a barbarity of incalculable consequences.” When Condés asked whether he should surrender, Vidarte advised him instead to hide—acknowledging that as the commanding officer of the operation, his responsibility was undeniable. Condés said he could take refuge in the home of Socialist deputy Margarita Nelken, whose security escort—José del Rey, one of the men in the van—was also involved in the operation.

At 9:00 a.m., the Court of First Instance and Instruction No. 3 of Madrid formally took over the investigation, prompted by the General Directorate of Security (DGS), which had just reported the midnight abduction of Deputy Calvo Sotelo by unknown individuals. Judge Ursicino Gómez Carbajo, who had previously handled politically sensitive cases, including the arrests of Falangist leaders and the investigation into Lieutenant Castillo’s murder, began the preliminary investigation. He was assisted by judicial secretary Pedro Pérez Alonso and officer Emilio Macarrón. Soon afterward, the DGS informed the judge that the two security guards stationed at Calvo Sotelo’s home had been placed at the court’s disposal. Under interrogation, they revealed that Calvo Sotelo had been taken by men in an official van commanded by a uniformed Civil Guard officer who presented valid credentials. Realizing the gravity of the situation, Judge Gómez Carbajo ordered their provisional arrest and opened a formal inquiry.

The judge instructed the First Criminal Brigade to identify and bring in all Assault Guards on duty at the Pontejos barracks that night, after discovering that multiple vans had left during the early hours. Witnesses from Calvo Sotelo’s residence—including the doorman, the governess, and a bellboy—were also summoned. The driver, Orencio Bayo Cambronero, was brought in but denied any involvement, even asserting that his van had been moved from its parked location. This despite being recognized by multiple witnesses. (Note: According to what Orencio Bayo told years later to the Francoist judges of the General Cause, after having cleaned the remains of blood from the van for the second time, he was called to the office of Commander Burillo where Lieutenant Barbeta was also present and both threatened him to deny having participated in any service during the night; they made him sign a statement in which he said that he had been sleeping from eleven at night to six in the morning (Bullón de Mendoza, pp. 683). According to Luis Romero (p. 212), "what the chauffeur tells may be true, and coincides with the threat that is also said to have been made by Del Rey when leaving the cemetery (that whoever said anything would die like a dog, or even more unpleasantly, 'like that dog'); however, it could be a means of self-protection against eventual responsibilities, both when the primitive summary was being investigated, and, with much more reason, in the Causa General". Ian Gibson, for his part, questions Bayo's account of Major Burillo's actions, since that night he was on duty at the General Directorate of Security (p. 139).) According to Ian Gibson, Bayo’s refusal to admit even being present that night “made it considerably more difficult to clarify the crime quickly".

Upon learning that Calvo Sotelo’s body had been discovered, Judge Gómez Carbajo went to the East Cemetery. He confirmed that the body bore two gunshot wounds to the back of the head. He then inspected the van used for the operation at the Pontejos barracks. Though it had been cleaned, blood traces were still visible between the floorboards. The van was seized for forensic analysis, and the judge also took custody of the Second Company’s service book—only to find the crucial entries for the night of July 12–13 were missing. Despite lack of cooperation from the police, the investigation continued. A lineup was ordered with members of Lieutenant Castillo’s company, but Lieutenant Alfonso Barbeta removed three individuals from the list—Aniceto Castro Piñeira, Bienvenido Pérez, and Ricardo Cruz Cousillos—claiming they were on duty elsewhere. Witnesses identified two guards (besides the driver), though neither had taken part in the crime; one would later claim mistaken identity. When Lieutenants Máximo Moreno and Alfonso Barbeta were interrogated, they provided evasive answers and denied being on duty the previous night. Ian Gibson contends that Barbeta, in particular, “more than anyone else, hindered the judicial proceedings.” In testimony before the Francoist judges years later, Aniceto Castro Piñeira claimed that Barbeta reassured his fellow guards: “Do not worry; nothing will be clarified; the Director General of Security, the Minister of the Interior, and the entire Government are responsible for what happened". While Gibson questions the authenticity of this quote—suggesting Castro might have embellished to save himself—Alfonso Bullón de Mendoza finds the claim plausible, noting that perceived political protection may have emboldened the guards.

That evening, Judge Gómez Carbajo suspended the lineup and, despite the late hour, visited the Calvo Sotelo residence to inspect the scene and take statements from the family. Their accounts matched earlier witness testimonies. When he returned to the court shortly before midnight, he was met by Supreme Court Judge Eduardo Iglesias Portal, appointed by the government to oversee the case. From that moment, Iglesias Portal took over the investigation—a judge who would later preside over the trial of José Antonio Primo de Rivera.

Later that evening, Luis Cuenca reportedly dined with another Socialist in a modest restaurant near PSOE headquarters. When nearby patrons began discussing a breaking story from the conservative newspaper Ya, which had published a special edition on Calvo Sotelo’s assassination, Cuenca became agitated. "But you are all wrong! It was not like that! I am going to explain how it was!" he reportedly exclaimed—before his companion intervened and calmed him down, preventing him from revealing anything further.

In the early hours of Tuesday, July 14, the autopsy on José Calvo Sotelo’s body was conducted by Antonio Piga Pascual, accompanied by three other forensic doctors. Their report confirmed that the monarchist leader had been shot twice in the occipital region with a short nine pistol, the bullets fired at point-blank range, almost simultaneously, from behind and at the same level as the victim. One bullet lodged in the brain; the other exited through the left orbital region. Death, they certified, was instantaneous, caused by “bulbar syncope of traumatic origin". They also confirmed that there were no bruises or wounds indicating any struggle inside the van, directly contradicting some sensationalist press accounts. Blood found inside the van matched Calvo Sotelo’s ABMN serological group. Despite this forensic clarity, the investigation stalled. Special Judge Eduardo Iglesias Portal, who had taken over the case, received no further cooperation from the police and had yet to initiate new proceedings. The only official action was the indictment of the van driver, Orencio Bayo Cambronero, who remained in custody. Iglesias Portal met with the public prosecutor Paz Mateos, the lieutenant prosecutor Vallés, and Commissioner Lino, but no significant advances followed.

On Wednesday afternoon, July 15, following a tense session of the Permanent Deputation of the Cortes, Indalecio Prieto returned to his residence on Carranza Street, which also housed El Socialista and PSOE headquarters. Outside, a crowd had gathered, among them Captain Fernando Condés, who, according to historian Stanley G. Payne, had been hiding in Margarita Nelken’s home. Prieto pulled Condés aside. “The summary for the death of Calvo Sotelo shows that it was you who arrested the victim,” he said. “I know,” replied Condés. “But I don’t care about myself anymore.” Overcome by guilt and disgrace, he declared that he was ready to take his own life. Prieto, instead of advising him to surrender, told him, To commit suicide would be stupid. You will have plenty of opportunities to heroically sacrifice your life in the struggle that, inevitably, will begin soon, in days or hours.” “You are right,” Condés replied. According to a young Socialist present, when Prieto showed visible disgust, Condés reached for his pistol, but several people restrained him. One supporter shouted: “But Condés, man, what madness! You did well killing Calvo Sotelo!” The incident calmed Condés somewhat. This witness later told Ian Gibson that Condés and Cuenca had not been hiding with Nelken, but rather in a mutual friend’s home. Historian Alfonso Bullón de Mendoza questions the timeline of Prieto’s account in his memoir Convulsiones de España, suggesting Prieto may have learned of Condés’s involvement earlier but deliberately avoided acknowledging it before his July 15 speech in Parliament.

On Friday, July 17, the Heraldo de Madrid reported that Judge Iglesias Portal had ordered Fernando Condés’s arrest—though censorship concealed his name and status as a Civil Guard captain. The widow of Calvo Sotelo had recognized him from a photograph. The report also confirmed the innocence of the two detained Assault Guards, while the case against Orencio Bayo grew stronger, as more witnesses identified him. Despite his persistent denials, Judge Iglesias ordered his continued detention. The search and capture order for José del Rey, another key figure, was also issued but never fulfilled. Arrests were ordered for three other Assault Guards: Tomás Pérez Figuero (who helped clean blood from the van), Bienvenido Pérez Rojo (participant in the expedition), and Antonio San Miguel Fernández (who had not participated in the killing). Despite initial optimism from the judge and prosecutor about solving the case, that very afternoon, the military coup—the prelude to the Spanish Civil War—erupted in the Spanish Protectorate in Morocco.

==== Spanish Civil War ====
As war broke out, Condés and Cuenca were named officers in Republican militias and joined the Battle of Guadarrama. Cuenca died on July 22 while attempting to take Somosierra. Condés was wounded on July 26 near the same location and died shortly thereafter. He received a widely attended funeral in Madrid. His eulogy was delivered by Margarita Nelken, who lamented that Condés, a valuable asset to the Republican cause, had died too soon. The General Headquarters of the Popular Militias was subsequently named in his honor. The other three Socialists involved in the assassination were also promoted to significant positions in the Republican forces. Santiago Garcés Arroyo became head of Military Intelligence Service, Francisco Ordóñez was named head of the State Information Service, and Federico Coello became a commander in Military Health. Lieutenant Máximo Moreno, also suspected of participating in the killing, was not prosecuted due to lack of evidence. He died on September 22 when his plane crashed; it was widely believed he committed suicide to avoid capture. Orencio Bayo, the van’s driver, was released on July 25 and returned to his post. José del Rey evaded arrest entirely and went on to command Republican units during the Siege of the Alcázar and later rose to the rank of commander. Lieutenant Alfonso Barbeta, detained for a speech delivered to his company the night of the murder, was released on August 8, as were Tomás Pérez, Antonio San Miguel, and Bienvenido Pérez Rojo.

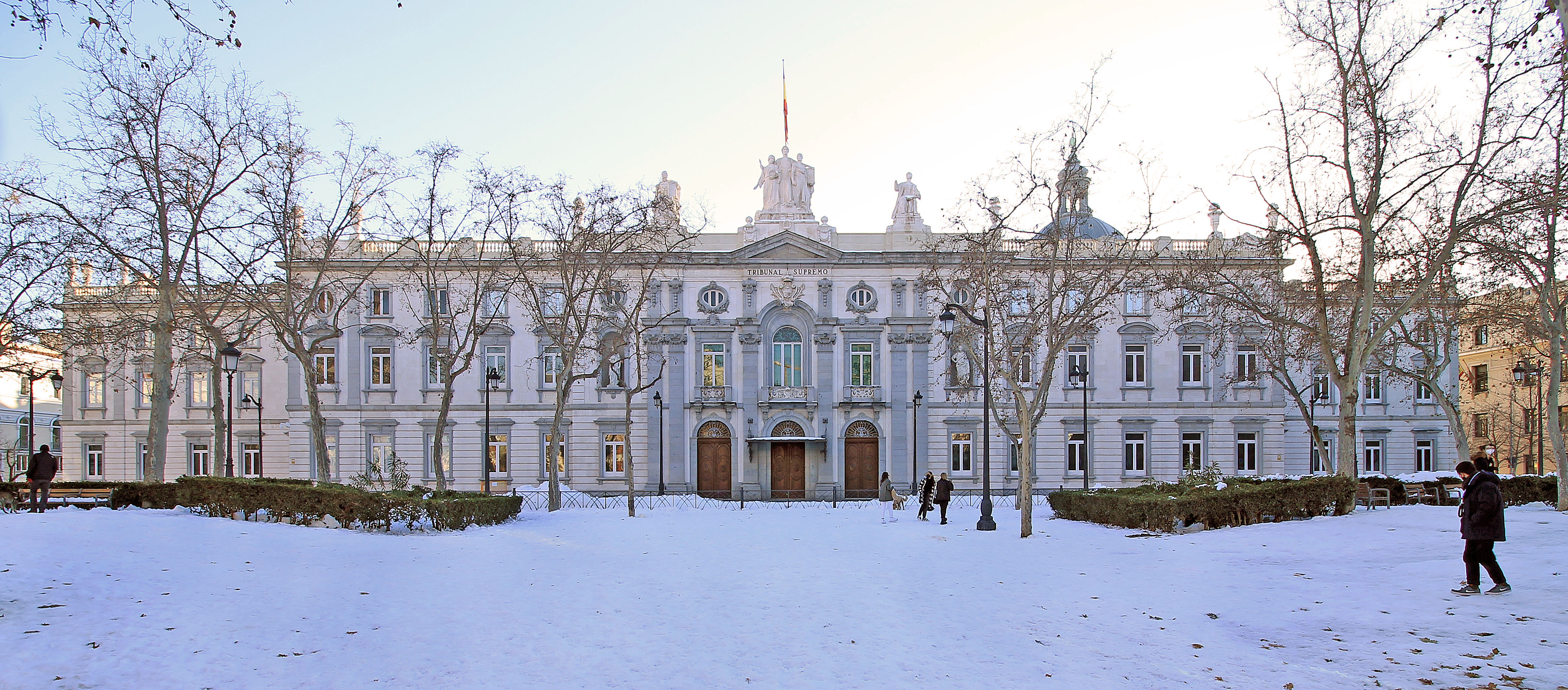
Main facade of the Supreme Court. On 25 July 1936, a week after the beginning of the war, a group of ten or twelve socialist militiamen burst into the building and at gunpoint seized the case file on the assassination of Calvo Sotelo.

On July 25, a group of Socialist militiamen, reportedly connected to Condés, stormed the Supreme Court. At gunpoint, they seized and destroyed the entire case file on the Calvo Sotelo assassination. They nearly shot Judge Iglesias Portal, who was saved by his police escort. Ian Gibson states that the militiamen were members of La Motorizada, a Socialist paramilitary group, and burned the documents immediately after taking them. (Note: Hugh Thomas claimed that the summary was stolen from the Ministry of the Interior (p. 234).) The judge tendered his resignation, which the court refused, instead ordering him to reconstruct the file as best as possible. This was a near-impossible task. Many witnesses had fled, died, or were fighting on various fronts, and the war was now fully underway. Court officer Emilio Macarrón later testified that even mentioning Calvo Sotelo’s name sparked outrage among left-wing citizens, making legal proceedings unviable.

Macarrón attempted to recreate the file from memory. New statements were also taken, including from Lieutenant Alfonso Barbeta, who denied involvement and insisted he merely advised the guards to accept what had happened. The reconstructed documents were later lost or disappeared during or after the war, but some resurfaced in 1970 and were added to Franco’s General Cause. On October 7, 1936, the General Directorate of Security notified Judge Iglesias Portal that the assassin was Captain Ángel Cuenca Gómez, and the instigator was Captain Fernando Condés. Neither could be arrested, as both were already dead. The letter noted that efforts to identify other participants continued. On February 1, 1937, the investigation was closed following a general amnesty issued on January 22 for political and common crimes committed before July 15.

After the war, Francoist authorities arrested and interrogated several members of the van’s crew. Aniceto Castro Piñeiro, Bienvenido Pérez Rojo, Orencio Bayo, and José del Rey were among them. Del Rey was sentenced to death and executed by garrote in 1943. In his statement, he claimed that the guards in the van did not know what mission they were undertaking until they arrived at Calvo Sotelo’s residence. Commander Ricardo Burillo, head of the Assault Guard group, was also executed by Francoist authorities, though Ian Gibson maintains this was an unfounded charge. Bayo’s death sentence was commuted to thirty years in prison. He served seven or eight years in Porlier prison before being released.

==== Historical analysis ====
Ian Gibson concludes that the assassination was never fully clarified, either during the Republic or under Franco. He finds no evidence that the killing was ordered by the government. Historians like Hugh Thomas share this conclusion, asserting that while the possibility of premeditation cannot be ruled out, the Republican government was not involved. Gibson, after extensive research for his book published in 1982, argues that the killing was indeed premeditated, citing a 1978 letter by artillery lieutenant Urbano Orad de la Torre. According to Orad de la Torre, UMRA officers decided to assassinate a right-wing leader in retaliation for the killing of Lieutenant Castillo, as a continuation of threats made after the earlier murder of Carlos Faraudo. Gibson also believes Condés’s complicity is undeniable, noting the improbability that Condés, upon hearing shots fired in the van, did not intervene. He speculates that the operation was likely coordinated between Condés and Cuenca, while the other Socialist militants in the van were probably unaware of the plan.

== Reactions ==
=== Response of Casares Quiroga's Government ===
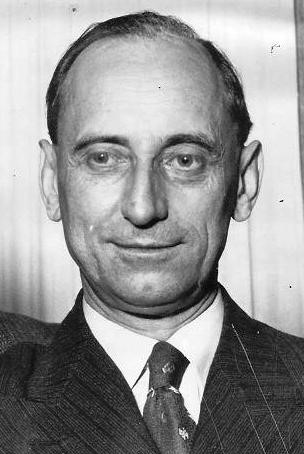
Santiago Casares Quiroga, president of the Popular Front government from May 1936. He presented his resignation after learning of the assassination of Calvo Sotelo, but the president of the Republic, Manuel Azaña, did not accept it. His response to the assassination was not as forceful as such an important event required.

The Spanish government convened at ten o'clock in the morning at the headquarters of the Presidency, unaware at that moment of the final confirmation of José Calvo Sotelo’s death. Upon receiving the news, Prime Minister Santiago Casares Quiroga reacted with visible concern, reportedly muttering to his military aide, “What a mess they have gotten us into". In response, he immediately contacted Diego Martínez Barrio, president of the Cortes, to suggest suspending parliamentary sessions for at least a week to allow tempers to cool and to minimize the risk of further incidents. Martínez Barrio agreed with the proposal, noting that many deputies regularly carried weapons and that heightened tensions could easily lead to violence. He had already reached out to various parliamentary groups, most of whom supported the suspension—except for the CEDA, which insisted that an ordinary session should be held to address the assassination. The monarchists also objected, though not as firmly. Casares Quiroga also sought the legal counsel of the Attorney General and the Undersecretary of Justice, Jerónimo Gomáriz, to determine appropriate candidates for special judges to oversee the investigations into the deaths of both Lieutenant Castillo and Calvo Sotelo.

The cabinet meeting adjourned at two o'clock in the afternoon and was set to resume later that day. As the ministers left, their grave expressions revealed the seriousness of the crisis. While most remained silent before the press, Minister Enrique Ramos briefly addressed journalists, stating that the government had taken measures and begun judicial proceedings, including the appointment of two special judges. He added that more details would be provided once the government had complete information. Casares Quiroga referred all questions to the Minister of the Interior, who, when asked, confessed that he had not yet fully reviewed the situation.

The public's growing demand for information was met with a tightly controlled press. Censorship was reinforced under the ongoing state of alarm, particularly to prevent use of the term "assassination" in reference to Calvo Sotelo’s death and to suppress any mention of law enforcement involvement. Despite this, the conservative newspaper Ya succeeded in publishing an extraordinary edition detailing the assassination, including allegations that Assault Guards and a Civil Guard captain had been involved. The edition was a huge success, widely circulated before police could confiscate remaining copies. The government responded by indefinitely suspending the newspaper, accusing it of spreading false information When Ya's journalists confronted the Minister of the Interior, Juan Moles, he claimed that while he had permitted publication, he had not authorized the claims about the perpetrators. Another conservative paper, La Época, was also shut down indefinitely after its director, the Marquis of Las Marismas, refused to publish a censored version that excluded the term "murder". Other regional papers such as El Día in Alicante and El Lunes in Oviedo also faced suspensions for evading censorship.

Later that evening, following the resumed cabinet session at six o’clock, the government released an official statement. Instead of issuing a strong condemnation or pledging to pursue the killers—who notably, including Luis Cuenca and Fernando Condés, were never arrested—the note equated the killings of Castillo and Calvo Sotelo, referring to both as acts of violence that merited condemnation. The government announced the appointment of two special judges from the Supreme Court: Enrique Iglesias Portal for the Calvo Sotelo case and Sánchez Orbeta for Castillo’s. Luis Romero later described the statement as circumstantial and superficial, failing to address the gravity of the situation. It vaguely committed to using the Public Order Law to maintain peace without clearly acknowledging the political crisis at hand. José María Gil-Robles, leader of the CEDA, dismissed the note as anodyne, expressing frustration at the government's inability to treat Calvo Sotelo’s assassination with the seriousness it deserved. Alfonso Bullón de Mendoza echoed this criticism, arguing that the note was deeply disappointing to those who expected decisive action. While the murder of both men was equally tragic from a humanitarian point of view, he noted, their political significance was not the same. The statement concluded with a generalized appeal to republican legality and national progress, calling on the “serenity” of the Spanish people to help preserve civilization and lawfulness. However, for many observers, this fell far short of the strong governmental leadership needed at that moment.

Romero observed that the government, fully aware of its lack of control, merely delegated responsibility to a special judge while attempting to present the deaths as a balanced tit-for-tat narrative, suggesting that Calvo Sotelo’s assassination was a direct consequence of that of Lieutenant Castillo. Gabriele Ranzato went further, describing the government’s failure to issue a categorical denunciation or take aggressive investigative steps as a fatal misstep. According to him, Casares Quiroga should have led a much more assertive response—not only to dispel any notion of governmental involvement in the assassination, but to contain the rising indignation and tension that were pushing Spain toward disaster. The lack of a firm statement also gave weight to right-wing accusations that Casares himself might have been complicit, based on a remark he had made during a parliamentary session on June 16 that was later interpreted as a threat. Although newspapers at the time did not give this interpretation, its significance grew in retrospect. Ranzato also criticized President Manuel Azaña for his silence during these critical hours. Bullón de Mendoza agreed, stating that Azaña, as President of the Republic, once again failed to rise to the demands of the moment. The government’s passivity in the face of a politically charged assassination, and its effort to treat both deaths as equivalent tragedies, further destabilized an already volatile political environment.

On the morning of Wednesday, July 15, during a session of the Permanent Deputation of the Spanish Cortes, José María Gil-Robles, leader of the right-wing CEDA party, launched a scathing attack on the government’s handling of the assassination of José Calvo Sotelo. He denounced the official response as grossly inadequate, criticizing the government for issuing what he called an “anodyne note” that equated two incomparable cases and deflected responsibility onto the judiciary. Gil-Robles underscored the shocking nature of the crime—a sitting member of parliament, a political minority leader, taken from his home at night by agents of the state and murdered—questioning how such an event could be treated with such nonchalance.

Historians such as Gabriele Ranzato argue that the murder of Calvo Sotelo appeared likely to go unpunished. The authorities displayed passivity and reluctance in pursuing the main culprits, despite their identities being widely known. Only a handful of lesser figures from the group that carried out what was referred to as the “punitive expedition” were arrested. Similarly, Alfonso Bullón de Mendoza believes that the Popular Front’s main concern following the assassination was not justice, but suppressing what it believed to be an imminent military uprising. Luis Romero emphasizes that the government’s mishandling of the investigation, combined with the involvement of state security agents, inconsistencies in the response, and previous remarks by Prime Minister Casares Quiroga in the Cortes, deeply entrenched the belief on the political right—and even among some apolitical sectors—that the government was either complicit in or responsible for the crime. He notes that while the right certainly exploited the situation, their belief in official involvement was sincere, with blame often directed at those most politically detested, including President Azaña.

This lack of decisive government action may have stemmed from the pressure it was under from leftist parties and organizations allied within the Popular Front. These groups, enraged by the assassination of Lieutenant José Castillo, were demanding a firm stance against the right wing. According to Bullón de Mendoza, the Socialists were especially interested in keeping the details of the Calvo Sotelo case from surfacing, as they could implicate key party figures—specifically members of Prieto’s entourage and the La Motorizada group, which was associated with Socialist paramilitaries. Late on the night of July 13, just hours after Calvo Sotelo’s assassination, leaders from the PSOE (Indalecio Prieto, Juan Simeón Vidarte), the UGT (Manuel Lois Fernández), the JSU (Santiago Carrillo), the PCE (Vicente Uribe) and the Casa de Pueblo met with Casares Quiroga at the Ministry of War. (Edmundo Domínguez) presented themselves at the Ministry of War. There, they pledged their full support in the event of a military rebellion. Casares thanked them but dismissed the seriousness of the coup rumors. Shortly after, these organizations issued a joint statement that committed their support to the Republic and resistance against reactionary threats. Historian Luis Romero suggests this public declaration effectively constrained the government's freedom to investigate the assassination objectively and pushed it toward adopting a stance that prioritized political unity over legal accountability.

The government did act vigorously against the political right. Nearly two hundred Falangists and right-wing activists were arrested, and the offices of Calvo Sotelo’s party, Spanish Renovation, were shut down. In an attempt to maintain an appearance of impartiality and authority, the government also closed the headquarters of the anarchist CNT, which was at the time engaged in a labor conflict with the UGT over a long-running construction strike in Madrid. The anarchist newspaper Solidaridad Obrera strongly protested this move, accusing the government of conflating their movement with fascism and weakening the anti-fascist front.

Meanwhile, press censorship was intensified. Public gatherings were banned, and even the parliamentary immunity of deputies no longer shielded their speeches from government censors. A circular was sent out on July 13 to all civil governors, warning them of potential subversive action in response to Calvo Sotelo’s death and instructing them to maintain close coordination with trusted security forces, monitor transportation routes, and arrest suspicious individuals acting as intermediaries.

Stanley G. Payne attributes the government's inertia directly to Socialist influence. He accuses Indalecio Prieto, the Socialist leader and close ally of Casares Quiroga, of having blocked a thorough investigation through a personal veto. According to Payne, there is evidence that Prieto and his allies deliberately shielded the perpetrators, even going so far as to intervene to halt judicial proceedings. This claim is based on the 1981 testimony of Assault Guard lieutenant Alfredo León Lupión, who told historian Ian Gibson that Casares Quiroga initially wanted to arrest all the officers of the Assault Guard unit involved. During a meeting with leftist leaders on the night of July 13, Prieto allegedly threatened political consequences if such arrests took place. According to León Lupión, Casares Quiroga responded by stating that any officer found to have been clearly guilty would indeed be detained. Though Payne and Bullón de Mendoza rely on this account to suggest that Prieto may have obstructed the investigation, León Lupión himself told Gibson that his intent was to show that Casares Quiroga had not been involved in the crime.

Casares Quiroga was so shaken by the situation that he offered his resignation to President Azaña. However, Azaña refused to accept it, reasoning that doing so would be tantamount to admitting government culpability in the assassination. Azaña also rejected advice from Diego Martínez Barrio, President of the Cortes, who urged him to replace the cabinet and take firm action against both the far right and far left to restore order and confidence. Azaña acknowledged the need for change but insisted on waiting, believing that accepting Casares’s resignation would compromise his honor. At a government meeting held the next day, July 16, some ministers called for bringing moderate figures into the cabinet to calm the national crisis. Others voiced concern about the infiltration of radical elements into state institutions, an issue that had been starkly exposed by the role played by uniformed state agents in Calvo Sotelo’s murder.

=== Response from the left ===
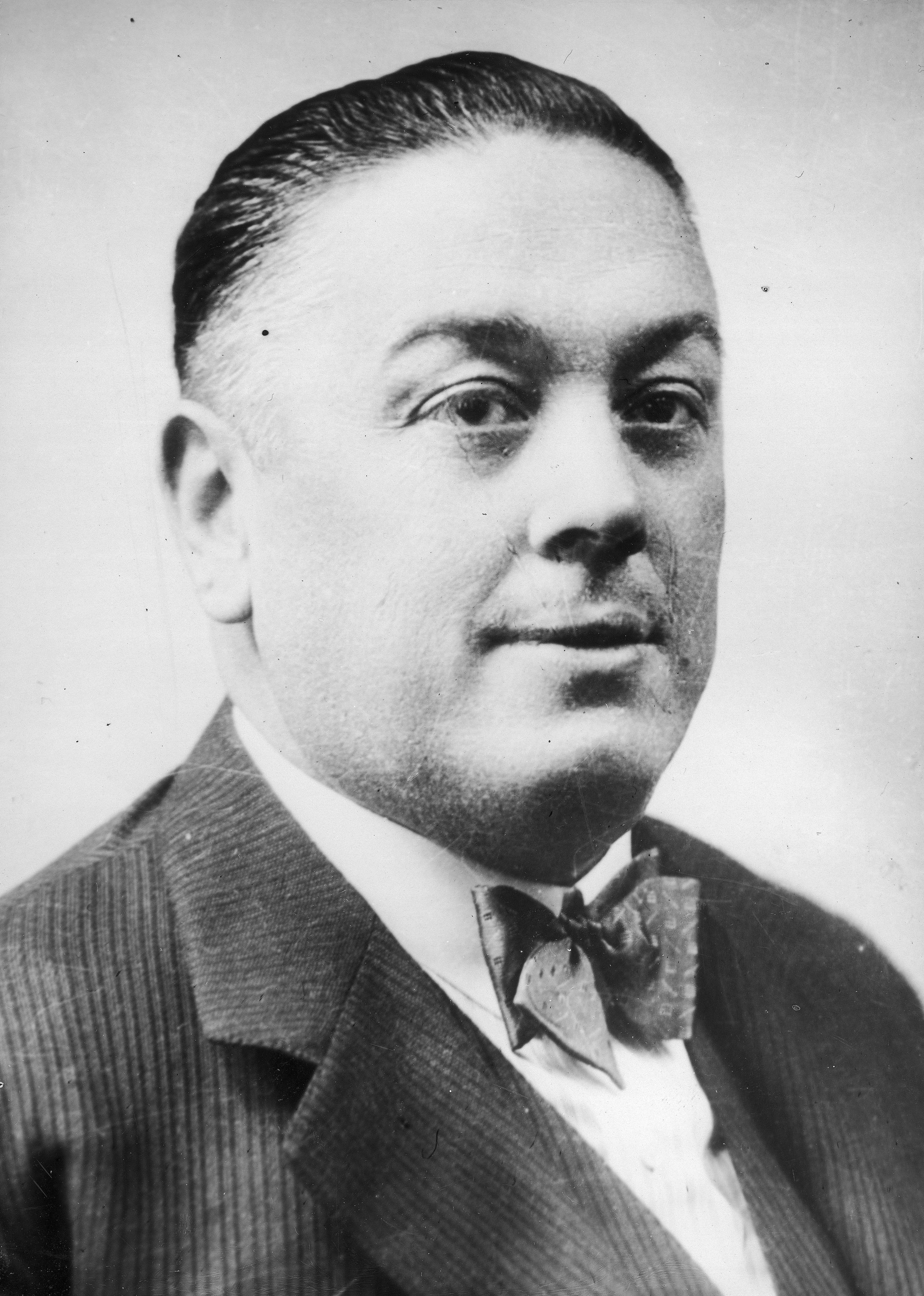
Diego Martínez Barrio, president of the Cortes and leader of Republican Union. He was one of the few left wing Republican politicians who at least privately appreciated the significance of the assassination of José Calvo Sotelo. He tried unsuccessfully to get Manuel Azaña to accept the resignation of Santiago Casares Quiroga and to appoint a new government ready to impose "harsh sanctions that would show the recovery of all the levers of power".

Diego Martínez Barrio, President of the Cortes and a moderate Republican unaffiliated with the radical sectors of the Popular Front, was one of the few prominent left-wing figures genuinely appalled by the murder of José Calvo Sotelo. According to historian Luis Romero, Martínez Barrio regarded the assassination as a national tragedy, not merely a political crime. His emotional meeting with right-wing deputies, including the Count of Vallellano, revealed a statesman deeply troubled by the event, which he saw as a rupture in public morality and political stability. A journalist from El Debate described him as “truly overwhelmed".

Unlike most leftist leaders, Martínez Barrio did not equate the assassination of Calvo Sotelo with that of Lieutenant José Castillo, nor did he justify one as a reaction to the other. Privately, he urged President Manuel Azaña to form a new government capable of enforcing harsh measures to reassert control. While avoiding open criticism to preserve Popular Front unity, he hinted at the government’s failure by stating: “Citizens cannot feel unprotected by the State". La Vanguardia echoed these concerns, warning of rising anarchy if a strong, authoritative government did not emerge. Antoni Rovira i Virgili, writing in La Humanitat, also called for legal order and an authentic Republic. Another leftist Republican, Mariano Ansó, later described the assassination as the most severe attack on the Republic since the revolts in Catalonia and Asturias, especially after learning the culprits included security officers. He dismissed Castillo’s murder as a valid justification.

Felipe Sánchez Román, not part of the Popular Front, openly condemned the killing and offered condolences to Calvo Sotelo’s family. In contrast, fellow leftist Rafael Sánchez Guerra was jeered when he attempted to sign the condolence book. The Republican Left parliamentary group demanded an end to extremist violence. Socialist Julián Zugazagoitia, editor of El Socialista, would later describe the murder as “truly monstrous.

The Republican press emphasized the death of Castillo, while right-wing papers like ABC and El Debate highlighted Calvo Sotelo’s, though their coverage was limited by government censorship. Ahora sought balance, describing both murders as “abominable crimes".

Política, aligned with the Republican Left, gave prominence to Castillo’s death, minimizing coverage of Calvo Sotelo’s. Its editorial condemned both right-wing provocateurs and left-wing retaliators. El Liberal criticized violence on both sides, insisting that those who resort to force are unfit to govern. La Libertad rejected both violence and tyranny.

The socialist newspaper Claridad devoted its front page to Castillo’s murder, relegating Calvo Sotelo’s to a few lines. El Obrero de la Tierra, aligned with the radical caballeristas, justified Calvo Sotelo’s assassination as a consequence of fascist aggression and called for the formation of Popular Militias to crush any uprising.

The Communist Party of Spain (PCE) went further. On July 13, it introduced a bill proposing the dissolution of right-wing organizations, imprisonment of their leaders, and confiscation of their press. The bill blamed “reactionary and fascist elements” for Castillo’s death and accused them of conspiring against the Republic.

Meanwhile, the PSOE, led by Indalecio Prieto’s centrist faction, convened a meeting of leftist organizations, issuing a statement in support of the government. Prieto’s article “Apostillas a unos sucesos sangrientos", published in El Liberal, called for unity and an end to political violence, warning that any uprising would face fierce resistance.

Upon their return from London on July 14, Francisco Largo Caballero and other caballeristas rejected the PSOE executive’s joint statement, refusing to recognize its authority. They eventually joined discussions but maintained a separate stance, advocating for workers’ committees and the arming of Popular Militias. According to Stanley G. Payne, this proposal effectively sidelined the state in favor of parallel revolutionary structures.

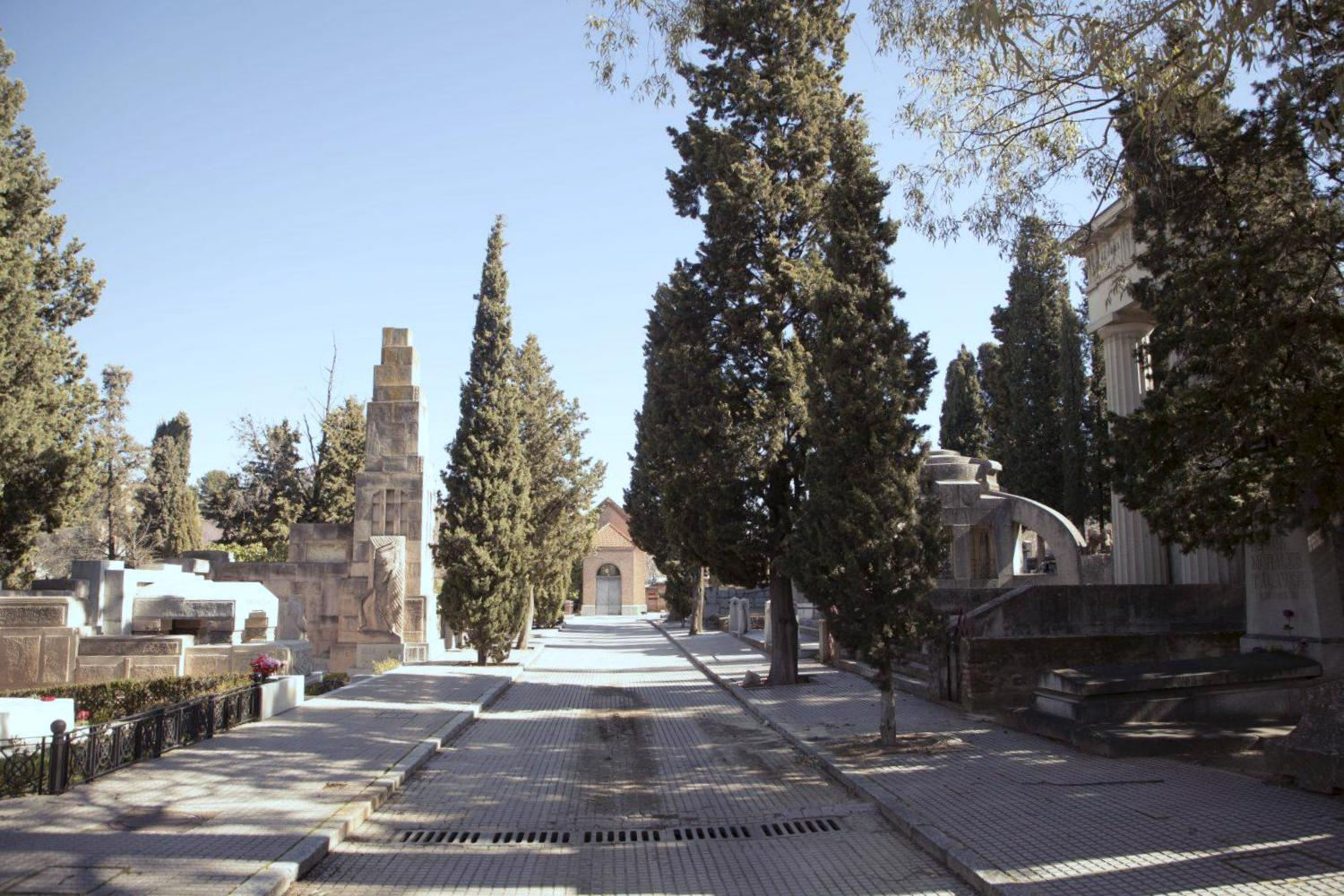
Civil cemetery in Madrid where Lieutenant Castillo was buried

Julián Zugazagoitia later recalled that many leftists did not view Calvo Sotelo’s assassination as consequential, believing the proletariat’s support made the Republic invincible. Francisco Largo Caballero himself had earlier stated, “If they stage a coup, let them. The working class cannot be defeated." In London, he reaffirmed his strategy: the Popular Front was only a temporary alliance; the ultimate goal was to replace the Republic with a socialist government.

At Castillo’s funeral on July 14, large crowds from the workers’ movement demonstrated their strength. Tensions rose when they encountered mourners from Calvo Sotelo’s funeral nearby. A young Socialist student recalled the atmosphere was charged with fear and hostility. That night, Indalecio Prieto wrote in El Liberal that “Spaniards, even after death, continue to hate each other,” lamenting that even the dead could not share the same morgue.

=== Commotion on the right (and in the liberal sectors) and funeral ===
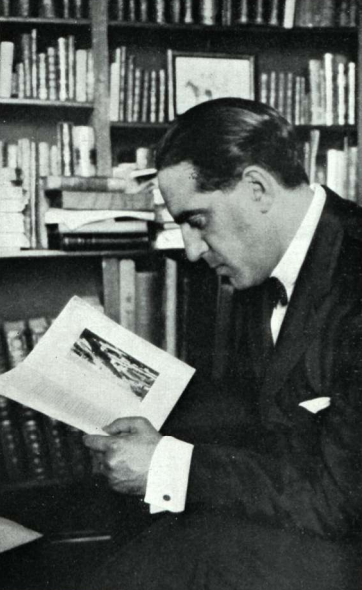
Gregorio Marañón in 1931, when he was a member of the Association in the Service of the Republic. He was shocked by the assassination of Calvo Sotelo. He wrote to Marcelino Domingo on the 16th: "Spain is ashamed and indignant, as it has never been before" (italics in the original).

The assassination of José Calvo Sotelo provoked shock and indignation across Spain, not only among conservatives. As historian Hugh Thomas noted, “the Spanish middle class was stupefied by this assassination of the leader of the parliamentary opposition by members of the regular police, even though they might suspect that the victim had been involved in a conspiracy against the State.” The family received numerous telegrams of condolence, funerals were held in various towns, black ribbons were displayed, and crowds gathered at his home and at the headquarters of Spanish Renovation to sign protest sheets bearing slogans like “Your blood will save Spain!” and “Now more than ever, long live Calvo Sotelo!". The conservative press, despite government censorship, gave extensive coverage. El Pueblo Manchego, a Catholic newspaper, published an editorial on July 15 stating, “We are at war. Whoever doubts it does not know how to see or understand the realities of Spain,” and called for a “National Front” to resist revolutionary threats. The Bar Associations of Madrid and Barcelona agreed on protest letters (the lawyers who signed them would be "purged" by the Republican authorities during the civil war). The Bar Associations of Madrid and Barcelona issued protest letters—signatories were later purged during the Civil War. The Bar Association of Zaragoza sent a telegram denouncing the murder as a national disgrace.

Shock was also evident among liberals supportive of the Republic. Gregorio Marañón wrote to Marcelino Domingo criticizing the government's inaction: “Spain is ashamed and indignant, as it has never been before". Many centrist and conservative leaders concluded that the state had lost control of its security forces. Alejandro Lerroux later recalled that by failing to punish the crime, the government demonstrated its impotence. Former minister Salazar Alonso wrote: “The vile assassination of Calvo Sotelo is confirmed. How appalling! But before this crime we must react like men...!"

From his prison cell in Alicante, José Antonio Primo de Rivera, leader of the Falange, used the assassination to justify the military uprising. On July 17, the day of the coup, he declared: “A group of Spaniards, some soldiers and others civilian men, rises today against the treacherous, inept, cruel and unjust Government that leads [Spain] to ruin.” He described the murder as a deed of “scoundrelly ferocity... unparalleled in Modern Europe".

Former King Alfonso XIII, in a letter to the Count of Los Andes, claimed the killing was planned and involved government complicity: “If now the Army does not start reacting... we can prepare to see all those who can do something fall one after another.

Calvo Sotelo’s funeral was held on July 14 at the East Cemetery, shortly after that of Lieutenant Castillo in a nearby cemetery. As per his wishes, his body was wrapped in a Franciscan habit and the coffin draped with a monarchist flag. A right-wing youth guard of honor accompanied the family and various conservative leaders, aristocrats, and military figures including General Kindelán. Thousands attended, many giving the fascist salute. A delegation from the Cortes was booed and forced to leave amid cries of “Death to the parliament!". A wreath was sent by Alfonso XIII. Antonio Goicoechea, leader of Spanish Renovation, delivered a speech pledging to avenge Calvo Sotelo’s death and “save Spain,” though censorship prevented its publication.

After the funeral, many attendees, mostly youth, marched toward central Madrid. At the Plaza de Manuel Becerra, the Assault Guard confronted them. Clashes ensued along Alcalá Street, culminating in a shooting at the intersections of either General Pardiñas or Goya Street. Two demonstrators were killed and several wounded. The violence continued in the city center, with additional casualties reported. No members of the Guard were injured. The excessive response triggered protests from some Guard officers, three of whom were arrested. Discontent also spread within the ranks at the Pontejos Barracks, particularly among those blamed for the assassination.

On July 15, censorship did not prevent the monarchist newspaper ABC from publishing a full-page obituary, using the term “assassinated” to describe Calvo Sotelo’s death: “José Calvo Sotelo, former Minister of Finance and deputy to Cortes. He died assassinated in the early morning of 13 July 1936. RIP. His family, the national forces he represented, his friends and co-religionists, ask for a prayer for the eternal rest of his soul."

=== Meeting of the Permanent Deputation of the Cortes ===
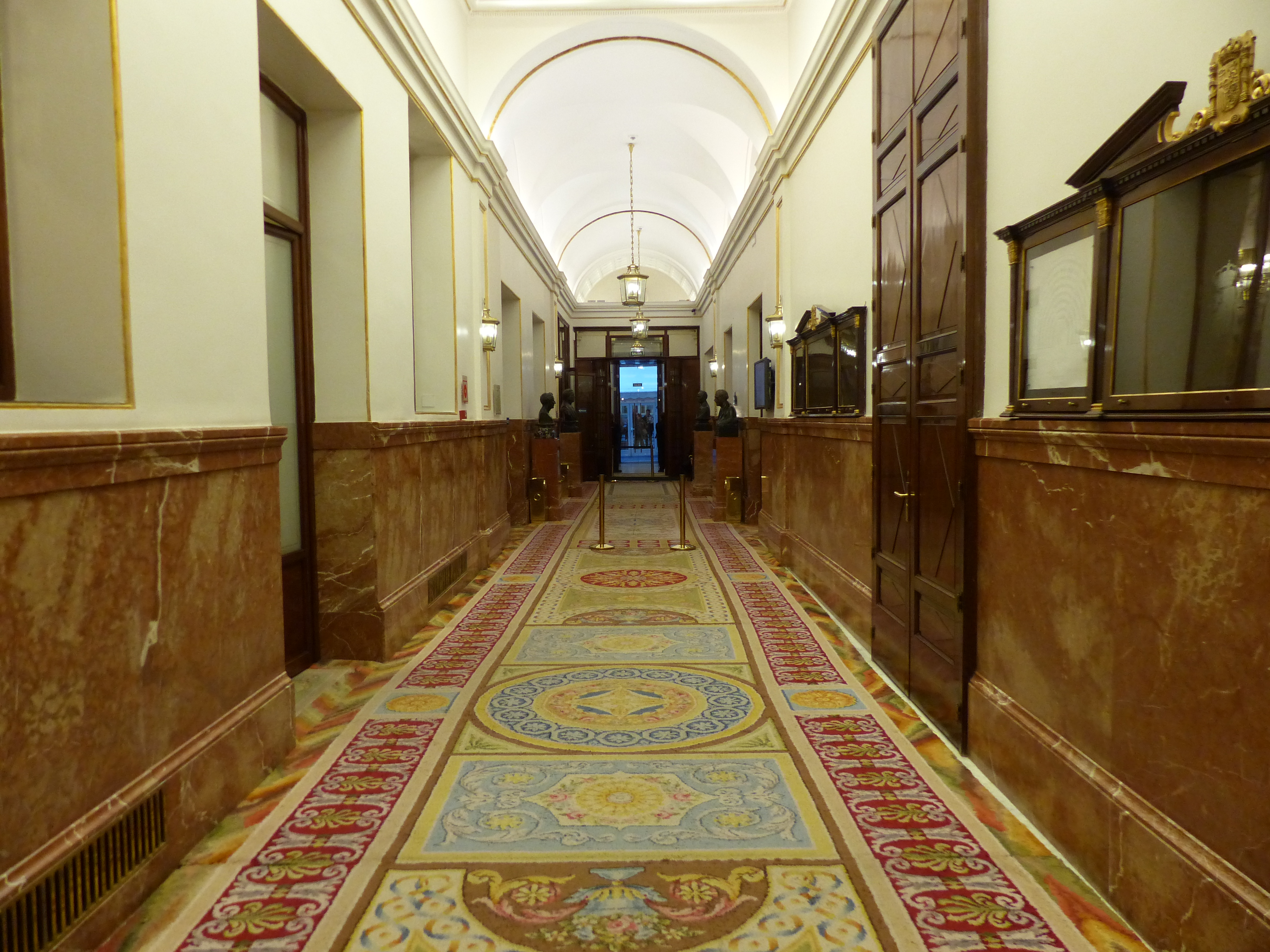
Interior of the Palacio de las Cortes, where the meeting of the Permanent Deputation took place

Both the Government and the President of the Cortes agreed to suspend parliamentary sessions until tensions subsided. However, the CEDA opposed the decision and insisted on holding a session to address the situation. When Diego Martínez Barrio, President of the Cortes, refused, CEDA leader José María Gil-Robles retorted: “Communicate to the perpetrators of Calvo Sotelo’s death that tonight I am sleeping at home, in case they want to come and assassinate me", prompting Martínez Barrio to accuse him of calling them assassins. Ultimately, President Manuel Azaña, invoking Article 81 of the Constitution of 1931, suspended the Cortes for eight days. Nonetheless, the Permanent Deputation was required to meet on July 15 to renew the expiring state of alarm. Diego Martínez Barrio hoped the session would be uneventful due to the limited number of attending deputies—22 in total, only seven from the right.

At 11:30 a.m. the session began, notably without the presence of Prime Minister Santiago Casares Quiroga, who was represented by Ministers Augusto Barcia Trelles and Juan Moles (Interior). After the motion to extend the state of alarm was read, the monarchist representative Fernando Suárez de Tangil, Count of Vallellano, addressed the assembly. He read a statement drafted by Pedro Sainz Rodríguez, describing Calvo Sotelo's murder as a "true State crime" and blaming the government for either instigating or being complicit in the act. Though Sainz Rodríguez later admitted he had no proof, this accusation would be perpetuated throughout the Franco dictatorship.

Historian Ian Gibson argues the monarchists used the assassination to discredit the government, regardless of its actual involvement. Two weeks earlier, Sainz Rodríguez had signed an arms deal in Rome to acquire 43 Italian fighter planes, a significant move in preparing for a coup. According to historian Ángel Viñas, this was a decisive step in facilitating Franco’s later transport of the Army of Africa to the peninsula.

The monarchist statement accused the government of fostering an atmosphere of violence that enabled the assassination, citing prior threats made in Parliament, including one by the Socialist Ángel Galarza. It also launched a scathing attack on Prime Minister Casares Quiroga, referencing his past actions and alleged threats to Calvo Sotelo. The monarchist bloc concluded by announcing its withdrawal from the Cortes, asserting that Spain was no longer a normal or civilized state.

Martínez Barrio responded cautiously. While acknowledging their grief, he declared that parts of the statement would be excluded from the official record to prevent further inflaming tensions. Specifically, he removed references to the government’s "crime of State," as well as the attacks on Casares Quiroga and statements suggesting institutional complicity in violence. Gil-Robles protested the redactions, accusing the government of silencing the opposition. (Note: There is a certain confusion about the account and the assessment that historians have made of the statement of the royalists in the Permanent Deputation since it is not the same to resort to what appears in the Journal of Sessions from which the most important phrase and the harshest accusations have been eliminated, as Luis Romero (p. 256), Stanley G. Payne (pp. 323-324) or Gabriele Ranzato (pp. 353-354) do, as it is to use the original document as published by Pedro Sainz Rodríguez in his memoirs, as Ian Gibson (pp. 185-186) or Alfonso Bullón de Mendoza (pp. 697-698) do.)

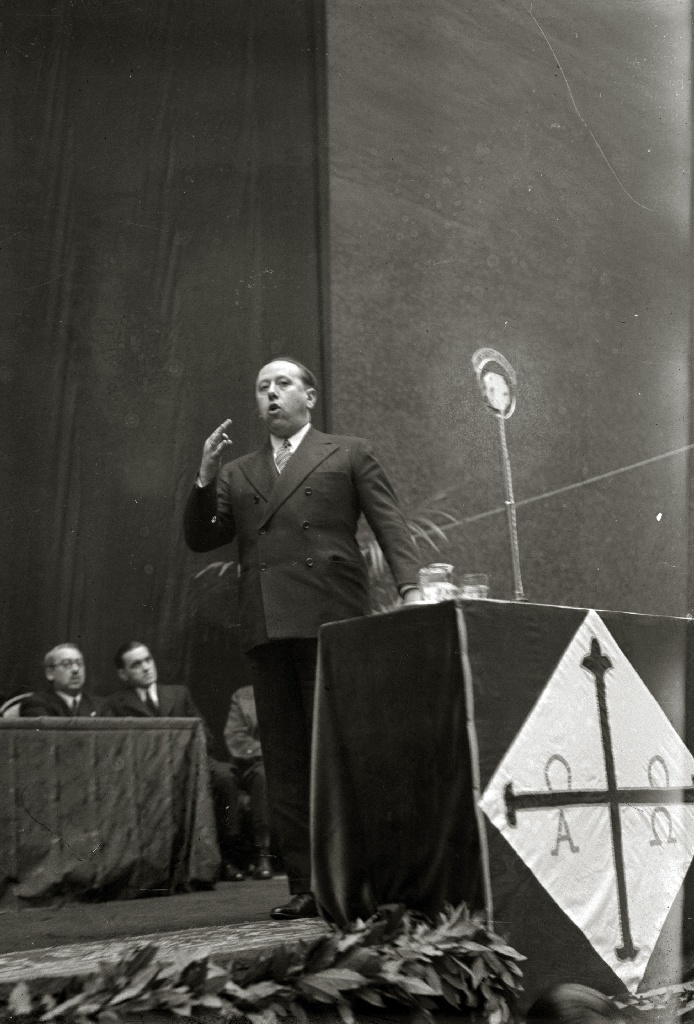
José María Gil-Robles at a CEDA rally at the Frontón Urumea in San Sebastián in 1935 (on the front of the table appears the CEDA logo). According to Gabriele Ranzato, his intervention in the session of the Permanent Deputation "was, for its efficiency and eloquence, his last great service to the cause of the uprising".

Minister Barcia followed with a brief expression of regret over Calvo Sotelo’s death. Gil-Robles then delivered a forceful speech, widely regarded as a key contribution to the ideological foundation of the imminent uprising. Though he rejected the direct accusation of government involvement in the assassination, he charged the government with moral responsibility for fostering a climate of violence. He cited past threats, incendiary rhetoric, and inaction as evidence. He accused the Popular Front of encouraging “a policy of extermination,” stating that the government's tolerance of political violence had alienated the right and degraded the legitimacy of the parliamentary system. He warned that each act of repression would provoke greater resistance and predicted that the violence the government had unleashed would ultimately turn against it.

In the latter part of his speech, Gil-Robles implicitly justified the insurrection, characterizing the rising tide of opposition as a legitimate reaction to tyranny. He argued that the Popular Front government had lost credibility and could no longer count on public trust or democratic legitimacy, and that those who still believed in legality would be replaced by more radical actors driven by national outrage.

In the wake of the fierce parliamentary challenge from the right—marked by accusations of a "State crime" and an inflammatory speech by CEDA leader Gil-Robles—the response from the government and its supporting parties was, according to historian Gabriele Ranzato, “inadequate, dilatory and inconsistent.” What the moment demanded, Ranzato argues, was a resolute Prime Minister who could both condemn the assassination unequivocally and expose the right’s opportunistic use of the tragedy to incite rebellion. But Prime Minister Santiago Casares Quiroga did not attend the session of the Permanent Deputation, a decision Ian Gibson considers a serious political error that lent credibility to accusations of government complicity. In his absence, Minister of State Augusto Barcia responded to Gil-Robles with a speech described by Ranzato as evasive and clumsy, by Gibson as dignified yet restrained, and by Alfonso Bullón de Mendoza as “vacuous". Barcia criticized Gil-Robles’ language as “monstrous,” and shifted blame to the center-right governments of the prior biennium—specifically the CEDA—for the prevailing instability. He claimed the government had taken all possible measures to investigate the murder, appointing the highest-ranking judge to oversee the case impartially. Interior Minister Juan Moles also intervened but failed to clarify the police’s role in the events surrounding the murder. He merely noted that some Assault Guard members had been arrested and suspended. He also introduced a false claim that the guards at Calvo Sotelo’s residence had resisted the attackers—a statement Bullón de Mendoza derided as senseless. According to Ranzato, the government missed a crucial opportunity to distance itself from the radical left and affirm a clear boundary between legal authority and revolutionary violence.

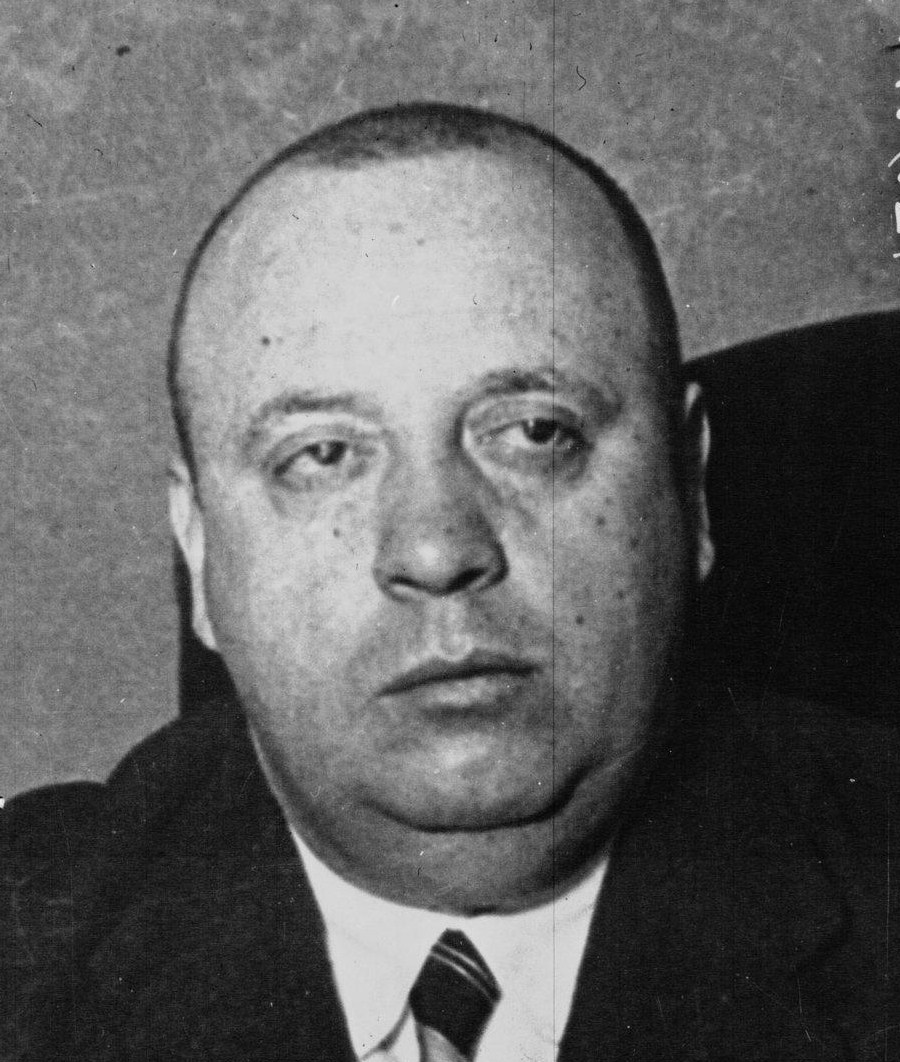
Indalecio Prieto, leader of the centrist sector of the PSOE. He responded to Gil-Robles' speech with the argument that the violence of that moment was the consequence of "the enormous ferocities committed on the occasion of the repression of the events of October 1934" carried out by the radical-cedist government.

Indalecio Prieto, a moderate socialist and critic of leftist violence in previous months, also failed to break ranks with the far left. Ranzato suggests that Prieto was compromised, as the assassins of Calvo Sotelo were members of his own security detail. Instead of distancing himself, Prieto resorted to familiar arguments: that the violence of 1936 was rooted in the brutal repression of the October 1934 uprising, and that the right bore its share of moral responsibility. Prieto insisted that while Calvo Sotelo’s murder was tragic, it was no more tragic than any other politically motivated killing. He equated it with the murder of socialist Lieutenant José del Castillo (Sirval) and blamed the right’s earlier tenure for fostering the lawlessness now afflicting Spain.

Though once a voice of moderation, Prieto had adopted a more militant tone by early July. His writings in El Liberal warned of impending conflict, calling on the working class to prepare for a harsh and total confrontation if civil war broke out.

Gil-Robles, in his rebuttal, countered Prieto’s relativism, demanding a full reckoning for the Socialist-led uprising in Asturias in 1934. He accused Prieto and his allies of unleashing revolutionary chaos that had now engulfed the Republic.

José Díaz, General leader of the Communist Party of Spain, also invoked the Asturias repression, decrying the use of colonial troops against Spanish workers. He warned Gil-Robles against any plot to overthrow the Republic, while simultaneously criticizing the government for its half-hearted response to right-wing subversion. He pledged that the working class would both support the Republic and oppose any fascist uprising.

Manuel Portela Valladares, a centrist, was one of the few voices to maintain neutrality. He opposed the extension of the state of alarm, arguing that a government that had declared itself openly partisan could not enforce such a measure with impartiality. Joan Ventosa of the Lliga took a more confrontational stance. He criticized Casares Quiroga as unfit to restore national unity and lamented the violence and incitement from government-aligned parliamentary factions. Ventosa emphasized the gravity of Calvo Sotelo’s assassination: not just as a political crime, but one carried out by agents of the state against a legitimate opposition figure. He, too, opposed the continuation of the state of alarm. José María Cid, of the Spanish Agrarian Party, also spoke, referencing the earlier threats made by Socialist deputy Ángel Galarza against Calvo Sotelo—threats that had been ominously echoed in the monarchist statement earlier in the session. The vote to extend the state of alarm passed narrowly, with 13 in favor, five against, and one abstention (Portela Valladares). Following the session, Gil-Robles, like many other right-wing leaders, left Madrid. He returned to Biarritz, from where he had rushed back upon hearing of Calvo Sotelo’s death.

Later that day, the Socialist-aligned newspaper Claridad, linked to the caballerista faction, issued a provocative editorial in response to Gil-Robles’ accusations. Written in mocking and threatening tones, it called for a dictatorship of the left: "Dictatorship for dictatorship, the left-wing dictatorship. You don't want this government? Then replace it with a dictatorial government of the left... You don't want civil peace? Then let there be a full-scale civil war". The article reflected the growing conviction among the radical left that a confrontation was inevitable—and winnable. The belief prevailed that the proletariat, should civil war erupt, would triumph swiftly.

=== Impact on the military ===
The assassination of José Calvo Sotelo on July 13, 1936, served as the definitive catalyst for the Spanish military rebellion that would erupt days later into the Spanish Civil War. While the military conspiracy had been in motion for months, the murder decisively ended the indecision of many hesitant officers and provided the conspirators with both the moral justification and psychological momentum to proceed.

Historians broadly agree that the assassination did not initiate the conspiracy but acted as its accelerant. Eduardo González Calleja emphasizes that while the coup was already being prepared, the killing “increased the determination of the conspirators and encouraged those who still hesitated". Similarly, José Luis Rodríguez Jiménez underscores that the event was not a turning point in planning but exacerbated an already deeply polarized and volatile political environment. Joan Maria Thomàs, for his part, affirms that the assassination of Calvo Sotelo was "decisive in arousing greater support among the generals and officers for the coup and, above all, in arousing support for it among sectors of the population". It also induced the passivity of democratically oriented military personnel when it came to defending the Republic. Luis Romero states: "On July 13, the conspiracy is well advanced, on the verge of exploding the rebel movement, but the shock produced by the death of Calvo Sotelo has a definite influence in the final setting of the date, in deciding the hesitant and subsequent events". Ian Gibson considers that the assassination "gave the rebels —whose conspiratorial plans were already well advanced on July 13— a new and unbeatable justification for the Movement in the eyes of world opinion. It convinced the still hesitant military that the time had come to take sharp decisions." Republican military officer Jesús Pérez Salas wrote in his memoirs about the impact of Calvo Sotelo's assassination on the Army as follows:

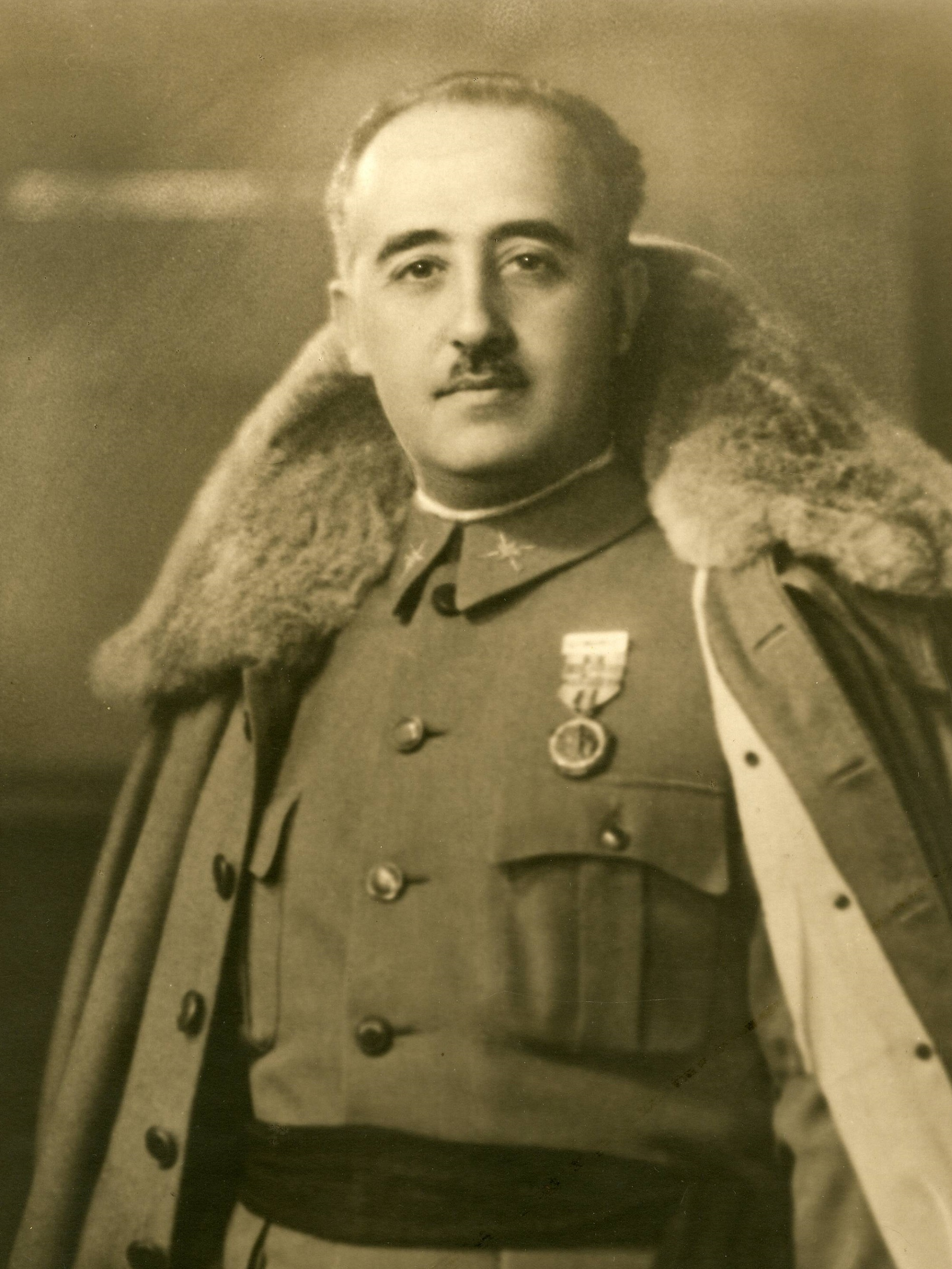
General Franco was informed of the conspiracy led by General Mola, which he did not join until the last moment (after learning of the assassination of Calvo Sotelo).

For General Emilio Mola, the assassination posed a risk of premature action: so electrified were the clandestine networks like the Unión Militar Española (UME) and the Falange that Mola had to rush to Logroño on July 14 to prevent an unsanctioned uprising on the 16th. Some factions even contemplated kidnapping President Manuel Azaña, though the plan was abandoned due to the proximity of the larger uprising. The most significant transformation occurred in General Francisco Franco, whose commitment to the coup had remained lukewarm until this point. On July 12—just one day before the assassination—Franco had sent a message to Mola implying a need for delay ("not very extensive geography"), reflecting his skepticism about the readiness and coherence of the conspiracy. Mola was deeply disturbed by Franco’s reluctance, even considering sending General Sanjurjo to Morocco in Franco’s place. (Note: Luis Romero already pointed out in 1982 that "this last hesitation of Francisco Franco, the last resistance to join the rebellion, not because he disagreed with what he intended, but because he considered that full conspiratorial maturity had not yet been reached and the indispensable circumstances for the uprising to begin under the best conditions were not yet in place, was unknown or silenced in Franco's histories until a few years ago" (pp. 226-228; 247).) However, upon learning of Calvo Sotelo’s murder, Franco underwent a decisive shift. On July 14, he informed Mola of his commitment to the rebellion. According to his cousin and aide Franco Salgado-Araujo, Franco believed the assassination, perpetrated by members of the state’s own security forces, signaled the moral collapse of the Republic and convinced him that armed intervention was now not only justified but necessary. Stanley G. Payne and Alfonso Bullón de Mendoza both argue that this marked the “limit situation” Franco had often referenced as a condition for rebellion. Luis Romero comments that while Franco may have joined the uprising regardless, it was Calvo Sotelo’s assassination that removed any lingering doubts. Hugh Thomas had earlier expressed a similar view, stating that the conspirators, though long preparing, may have lacked the resolve to act without this shocking event.

The assassination also had a decisive effect on the Carlists, the monarchist traditionalist movement, who had been in cautious talks with Mola. On July 15, the Supreme Carlist Military Assembly in Saint Jean de Luz officially committed the movement to the rebellion, stating that the Comunión Tradicionalista would “join, with all its forces, in all of Spain to the Military Movement for the Salvation of the Homeland.” This sealed an alliance that expanded the rebellion's base and added a potent, ideologically motivated militia force.

=== Beginning of the uprising ===
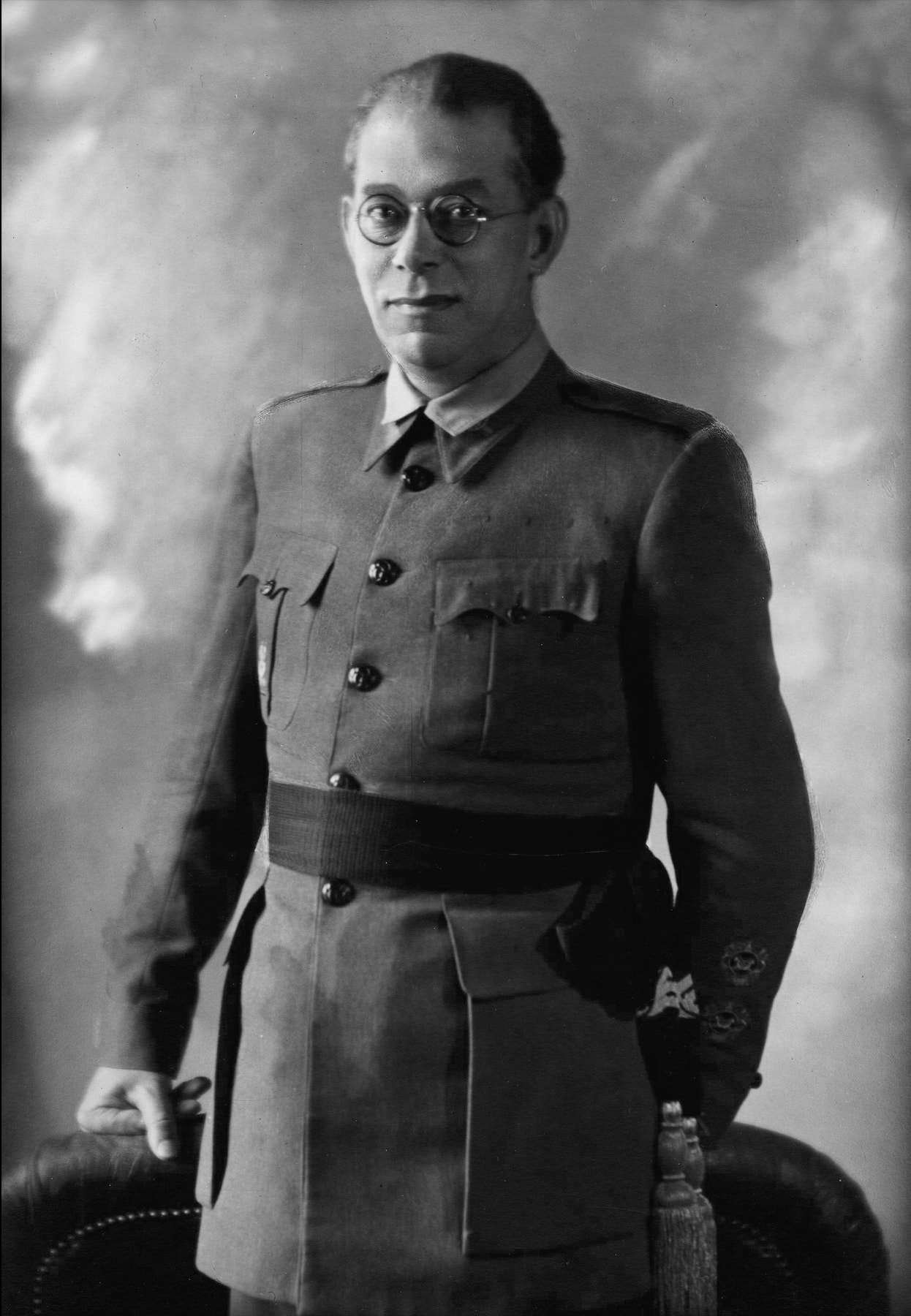
General Emilio Mola, organizer and main promoter of the 1936 coup conspiracy, for which he was known by the code name of "The Director". Mola was the one who defined the political and military plan of the coup d'état of July 1936 whose relative failure provoked the Spanish civil war. He tried to avoid the mistakes made during the failed Sanjurjada of four years earlier.

All ultimately followed General Mola’s order for the uprising to begin on Friday, July 17, in the Spanish Protectorate in Morocco—coinciding with news that forces there would be ready by July 16. On the peninsula, the rebellion was to unfold gradually between Saturday, July 18, and Monday, July 20. Unlike the original plan for a simultaneous uprising, Mola allowed each garrison to act when deemed appropriate, aiming to trigger a domino effect. The only fixed date and time was for the Protectorate: July 17 at 17:00. This was communicated on July 15 by Mola to his liaison in Madrid, Lieutenant Colonel Valentín Galarza. The day before, the Dragon Rapide plane arrived at the Gando aerodrome (Gran Canaria) to transport General Franco from the Canary Islands to Morocco. It avoided landing in Tenerife—where Franco was stationed—due to inadequate facilities. Franco used the funeral of General Amado Balmes, who had died in a firearm accident, as a pretext to travel there. At 7:15 a.m. on July 17, a liaison sent from Bayonne by Mola dispatched three coded radiotelegrams—to Franco in Tenerife, General Sanjurjo in Lisbon, and Lieutenant Colonel Juan Seguí Almuzara in Melilla—reaffirming the order to begin the uprising at 17:00. However, according to Luis Romero, the radiograms were dated July 18, and the coup in Melilla was advanced to the afternoon of July 17 to avoid the arrest of conspirators gathered at the Boundary Commission offices in the Alcazaba.

Some conservative figures not directly involved in the conspiracy were warned and advised to leave cities such as Madrid or Barcelona. Francesc Cambó departed from Barcelona, while Alejandro Lerroux went to Portugal, where he expressed support for the coup. Melquiades Álvarez chose to remain in Madrid and was later killed in the sacking of the Model Prison of Madrid on 22 August 1936. Committed right-wing leaders began leaving Madrid after Calvo Sotelo’s funeral on July 14 or following the Permanent Deputation meeting on July 15. José María Gil-Robles departed for Biarritz that same day; Antonio Goicoechea left for a farm near the Portuguese border on July 17. That day, Calvo Sotelo’s widow and children also left Madrid on the Lisbon express, prompted in part by threatening graffiti, including one reading: "the descendants of Calvo Sotelo will follow the same path as their father." They arrived in Lisbon on July 18, where General Sanjurjo received them at the Estación del Rocío, reportedly telling the widow: "We have lost the most illustrious man in Spain." The family relocated to the rebel zone in September 1937.

== Assessment ==
Italian historian Gabriele Ranzato argues that the assassination of Calvo Sotelo exposed the failure of the Popular Front government to uphold the rule of law. Rather than using legal means to address subversive violence, the state allowed an act of summary vengeance by its own security forces against a prominent opposition leader, without taking immediate or decisive action. This, he notes, created a sense of insecurity among many citizens.

Joan Maria Thomàs supports this view, emphasizing the government's weak response to the assassination. He contends that its failure to act decisively disillusioned sectors of society demanding a return to order.

Alfonso Bullón de Mendoza shares this perspective but goes further, asserting that the civil war might have been avoided had the government responded forcefully. According to him, a strong reaction to the unprecedented killing of a National Deputy by state forces could have reassured the public and deterred the conspirators. He adds that, without the impact of Calvo Sotelo’s murder, the uprising might not have escalated beyond a failed coup.

In 1965, American historian Gabriel Jackson similarly condemned the assassination, calling it intolerable for anyone not aligned with the far left. However, he also criticized the impunity with which right-wing groups, such as the Phalanx and the UME, conducted their own campaign of violence. He viewed the murders of Lieutenant José Castillo and Calvo Sotelo as equally shocking to public opinion.

Stanley G. Payne highlights the uniqueness of the event, stating that no Western parliamentary regime had previously seen its police collaborate with revolutionary elements to assassinate an opposition leader. However, he adds that by this point, the Spanish Republic could no longer be considered a functioning constitutional system.

Historian Julius Ruiz draws parallels between Calvo Sotelo’s murder and the "Red Terror" that later erupted in the Republican zone. He identifies three key precedents: the collaboration between police and militia, the use of official authority to abduct victims, and the subsequent political cover provided to the perpetrators. He describes the act as a form of political gangsterism, with tactics that would be widely replicated in the ensuing months.

== Legacy during Franco's regime: the mythification of the "protomartyr" ==
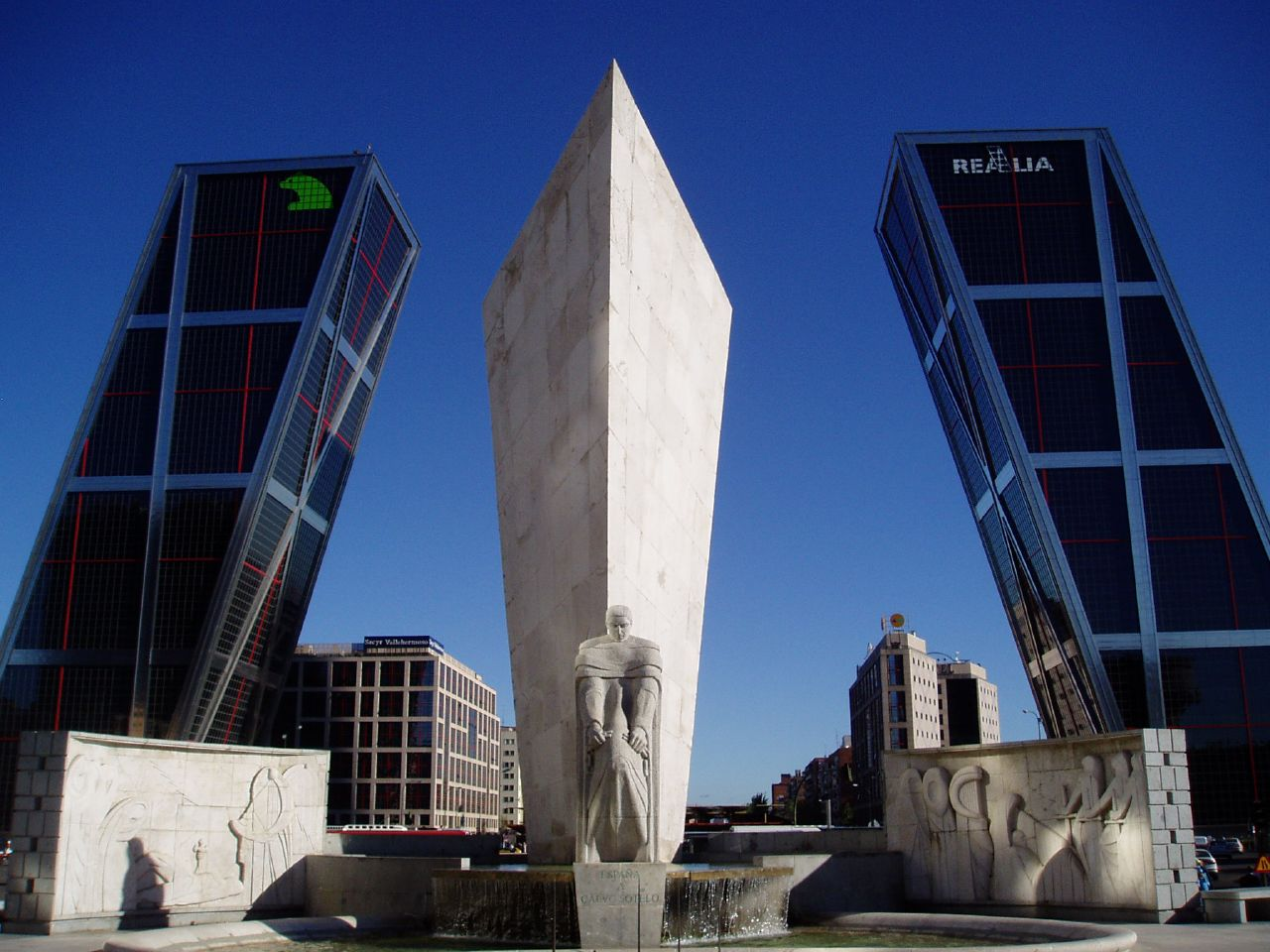
Monument to Calvo Sotelo in the Plaza de Castilla in Madrid, erected by M. Manzano and C. Ferreira (1960)

The rebel faction used the assassination of José Calvo Sotelo to justify the July 1936 coup and accused the Republican government of direct involvement. On 19 April 1938, General Franco declared that the Popular Front regime had effectively ended the night Calvo Sotelo was murdered by agents acting on its behalf. That same year, journalist Benjamín Bentura published a pamphlet through Ediciones Antisectarias titled Por quién fue asesinado Calvo Sotelo, aiming to demonstrate the government's complicity. One key claim was that Captain Condés met with Prime Minister Casares Quiroga shortly before the murder—an assertion based solely on testimony from a Civil Guard commander and widely discredited by historians like Ian Gibson, who noted its transformation into a central dogma of Francoist propaganda.

Later in the war, Franco ordered the formation of the Commission on the Illegitimacy of the Powers Acting on 18 July 1936, tasked with proving the Popular Front's illegitimacy. The commission relied heavily on questionable testimonies to argue that the government orchestrated Calvo Sotelo’s murder. According to Gibson, the commission selectively sought witnesses to support the claim of a “State crime.” One such source was Andrés Amado, Calvo Sotelo’s friend, whose statement was noted for its strong value judgments. The commission also interrogated former Socialist minister Julián Zugazagoitia, who had been extradited by the Nazis. He made a disparaging remark about Luis Cuenca, one of the assassins, suggesting his capacity for political violence.

During the postwar judicial proceedings known as the Causa General, judges pursued evidence of government involvement in the assassination, although most testimonies obtained—often under duress—are now considered unreliable. Historian Luis Romero emphasized the need for caution when evaluating these sources, while Gibson noted witnesses likely shaped their accounts to fit what Francoist judges wanted to hear.

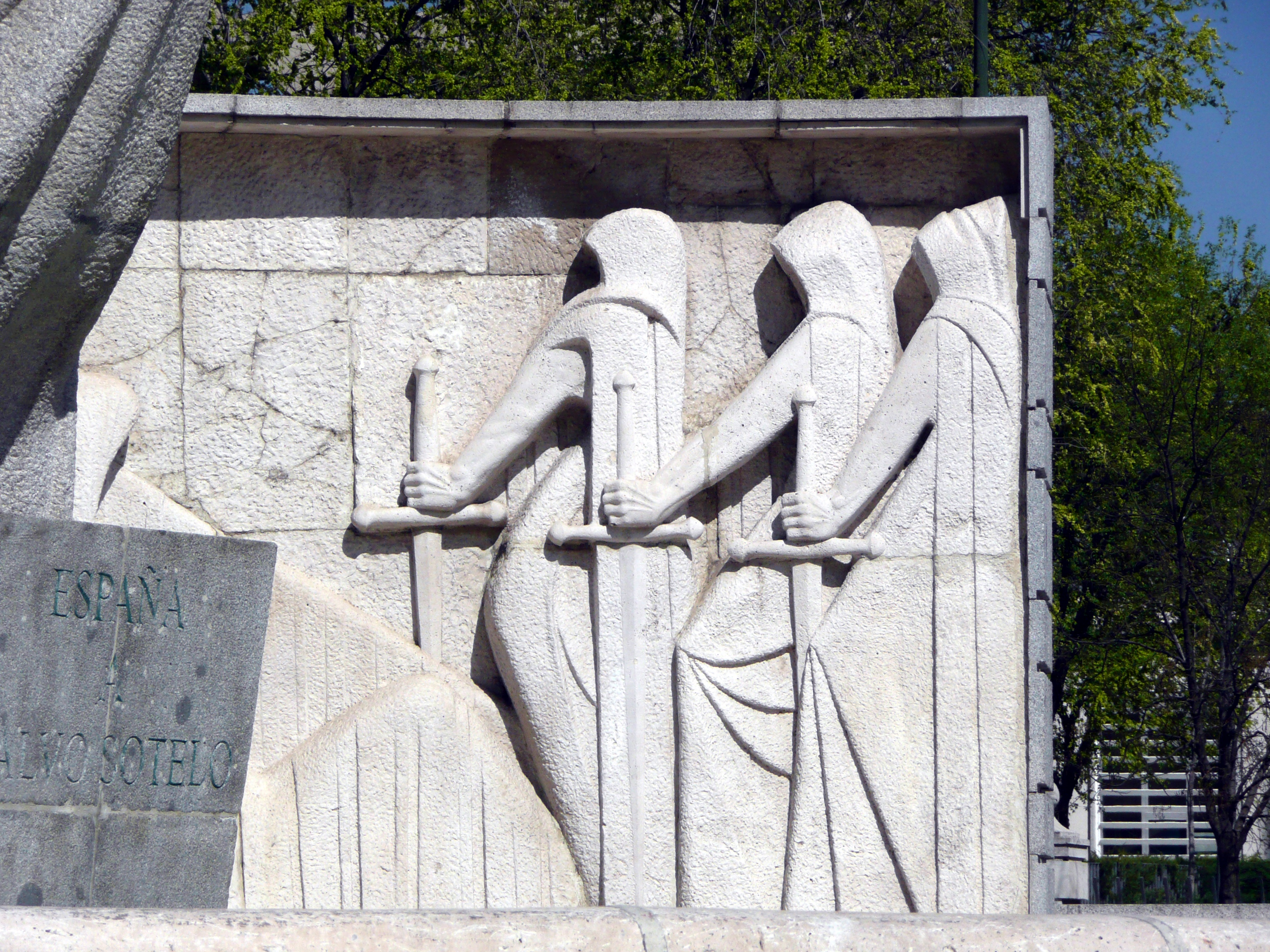
Relief of the Monument to Calvo Sotelo showing three crusaders paying homage to the "protomartyr" of the Liberation Crusade

Among the few Assault Guards arrested and interrogated after the war were the driver Orencio Bayo Cambronero, José del Rey Hernández, Aniceto Castro Piñeiro, and Bienvenido Pérez Rojo. However, the testimony most emphasized in Francoist historiography was that of Esteban Abellán Llopis, a lieutenant in the 9th Security Company. Abellán alleged that senior officials, including Director General of Security José Alonso Mallol and Interior Minister Juan Moles, were aware of or complicit in the plan for retaliation. Gibson questioned Abellán’s credibility, highlighting inconsistencies and contrasting his version with that of Lieutenant Alfredo León Lupión, who was present at key meetings and considered a more reliable witness.

Concurrently, the figure of Calvo Sotelo was mythologized as a martyr. In July 1937, monarchist José Félix de Lequerica wrote an article in El Ideal Gallego romanticizing a gathering with Calvo Sotelo days before his death, portraying him as the embodiment of Spain’s hope.

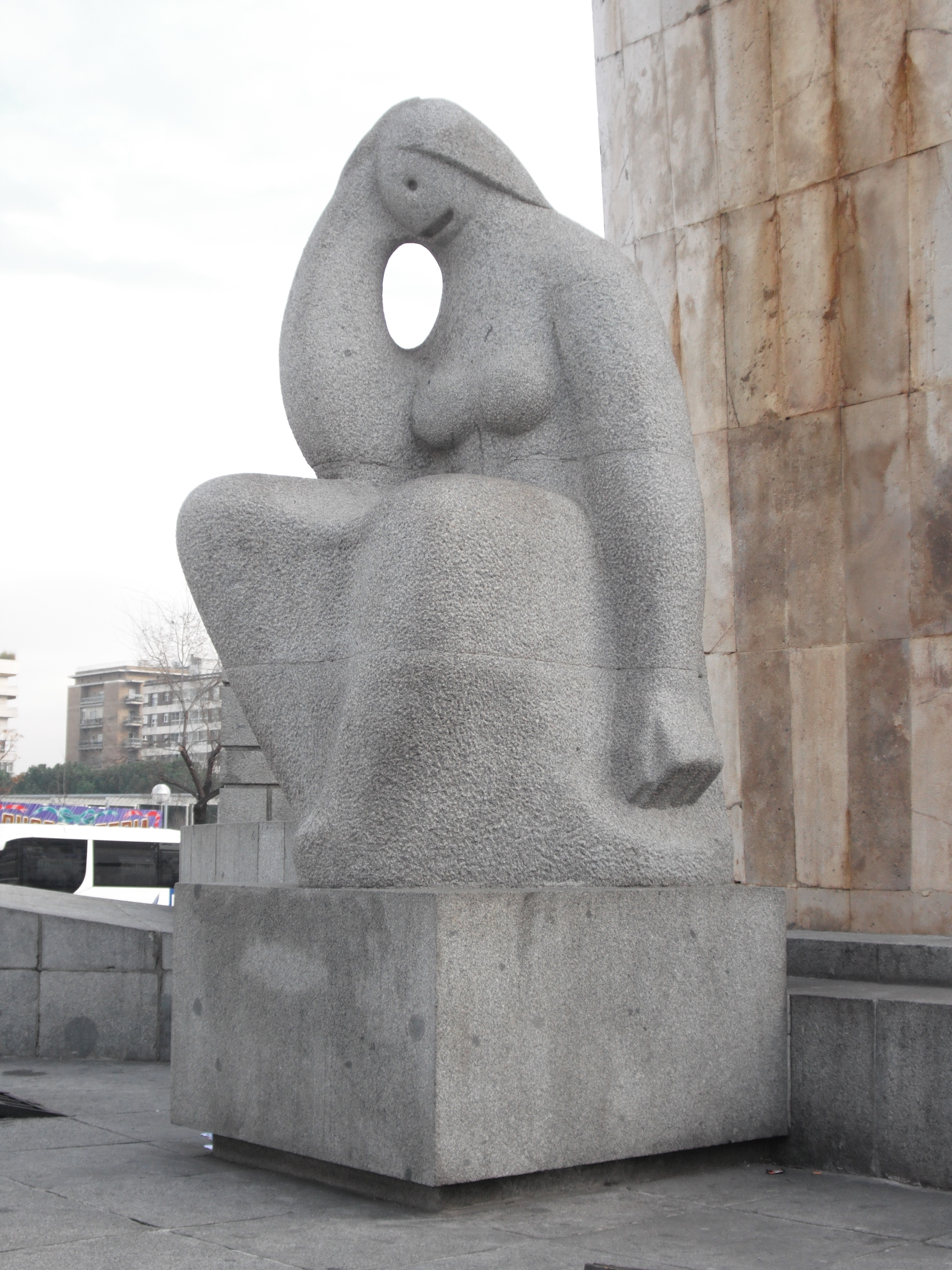
Allegorical sculpture representing "Pain", located at the back of the Monument to Calvo Sotelo

In 1960, Luis de Galinsoga, director of ABC during Calvo Sotelo’s assassination, published a highly rhetorical piece titled Conciencia de mártir en Calvo Sotelo. He described Calvo Sotelo as a prophetic figure who knowingly accepted martyrdom in defense of Spain, framing his death as the divine genesis of the National Uprising. According to Galinsoga, Calvo Sotelo’s daily presence in parliament represented a moral struggle against a Republic dominated by “outlaws and gunmen.

On 13 July 1960, Franco inaugurated the Monument to Calvo Sotelo in the Plaza de Castilla in Madrid. In his speech, he called the assassination “the palpable demonstration” of Spain’s descent toward communism and credited the murder with uniting Spaniards and prompting the National Uprising. Franco emphasized that Calvo Sotelo’s death dissolved hesitation among patriots and marked the start of their “unavoidable duty".

== Bibliography ==
- Alía Miranda, Francisco (2011). Julio de 1936. Conspiración y alzamiento contra la Segunda República (in Spanish). Barcelona: Crítica. ISBN 978-84-9892-208-0.
- Alía Miranda, Francisco (2018). Historia del Ejército español y de su intervención política. Madrid: Los Libros de la Catarata. ISBN 978-84-9097-459-9.
- Aróstegui, Julio (2006). Por qué el 18 de julio… Y después. Barcelona: Flor del Viento Ediciones. ISBN 84-96495-13-2.
- Beevor, Antony (2005). La Guerra Civil Española (in Spanish). Barcelona: Crítica.
- Bullón de Mendoza, Alfonso (2004). José Calvo Sotelo (in Spanish). Barcelona: Ariel. ISBN 84-344-6718-6.
- Cruz, Rafael (2006). En el nombre del pueblo. República, rebelión y guerra en la España de 1936 (in Spanish). Madrid: Siglo XXI. ISBN 84-323-1230-4.
- García Rodríguez, Jose (2013). Conspiración para la Rebelióm militar del 18 de julio de 1936 (del 16 de febrero al 17 de julio) (in Spanish). Madrid: Sílex. ISBN 978-84-7737-748-1.
- Gibson, Ian (1982). La noche que mataron a Calvo Sotelo (in Spanish). 5th revised edition. Barcelona: Argos Vergara. ISBN 84-7178-370-3.
- González Calleja, Eduardo (2011). Contrarrevolucionarios. Radicalización violenta de las derechas durante la Segunda República (in Spanish). Madrid: Alianza Editorial. ISBN 978-84-206-6455-2.
- — (2015). Cifras cruentas. Las víctimas mortales de la violencia sociopolítica en la Segunda República española (1931-1936) (in Spanish). Granada: Comares. ISBN 978-84-9045-328-5.
- Jackson, Gabriel (1976) [1965]. La República Española y la Guerra Civil, 1931-1939 (in Spanish) (2nd ed.). Barcelona: Crítica. ISBN 84-7423-006-3.
- Macarro Vera, José Manuel (2000). Socialismo, República y revolución en Andalucía (1931-1936) (in Spanish). Seville: Secretariado de Publicaciones de la Universidad de Sevilla. ISBN 84-472-0599-1.
- Martín Ramos, José Luis (2015). El Frente Popular. Victoria y derrota de la democracia en España. Barcelona: Pasado & Presente. ISBN 978-84-944272-5-1.
- Mera Costas, Pilar (2021). 18 de julio de 1936. El día que empezó la Guerra Civil. Col. ‘La España del siglo XX en 7 días’, dirigida por Jordi Canal. Barcelona: Taurus. ISBN 978-84-306-2269-6.
- Payne, Stanley (1996). "Antecedentes y crisis de la democracia". In Stanley Payne; Javier Tusell (eds.). La Guerra Civil. Una nueva visión del conflicto que dividió España. Madrid: Temas de hoy. pp. 17–122. ISBN 84-7880-652-0.
- Payne, Stanley G. (2020) [2016]. El camino al 18 de julio. La erosión de la democracia en España (diciembre de 1935-julio de 1936) (in Spanish). Pocket edition: Booket Collection. Barcelona: Espasa. ISBN 978-84-670-5359-3.
- Preston, Paul (1998) [1993]. Franco "Caudillo de España" (in Spanish). First edition in Mitos Bolsillo. Barcelona: Grijalbo Mondadori. ISBN 84-397-0241-8.
- — (2011). El holocausto español. Odio y exterminio en la Guerra Civil y después (in Spanish). Barcelona: Debate. ISBN 978-84-8306-852-6.
- Ranzato, Gabriele (2014). El gran miedo de 1936. Cómo España se precipitó en la Guerra Civil (in Spanish). Madrid: La Esfera de los Libros. ISBN 978-84-9060-022-1.
- Rey Reguillo, Fernando (2008). Paisanos en lucha. Exclusión política y violencia en la Segunda República Española (in Spanish). Presentation by Mercedes Cabrera. Madrid: Biblioteca Nueva. ISBN 978-84-9742-904-7.
- Rodríguez Jiménez, José Luis (1997). La extrema derecha española en el siglo XX (in Spanish). Madrid: Alianza Editorial. ISBN 84-206-2887-5.
- Romero, Luis (1982). Por qué y cómo mataron a Calvo Sortelo (in Spanish). Barcelona: Planeta. ISBN 84-3205-678-2.
- Ruiz, Julius (2012). El Terror Rojo. Madrid, 1936 (in Spanish). Barcelona: Espasa. ISBN 978-84-670-3433-2.
- Thomas, Hugh (2011). La Guerra Civil española (in Spanish). Pocket edition. Barcelona: Grijalbo. ISBN 978-84-9908-087-1.
- Thomàs, Joan Maria (2010). "Las derechas extremas y la confrontación prebélica". In Ballarín, Manuel; Ledesma, José Luis (eds.). La República del Frente Popular. Reformas, conflictos y conspiraciones (in Spanish). Speeches of the IV Meeting "History and Commitment" (Zaragoza, December 2008). Zaragoza: Fundación Rey del Corral de Investigaciones Marxistas. pp. 139–148. ISBN 978-84-613-6121-2.
- Viñas, Ángel (2019). ¿Quién quiso la guerra civil? Historia de una conspiración (in Spanish). Barcelona: Crítica. ISBN 978-84-9199-090-1.
- Zugazagoitia, Julián (2007) [1940]. Guerra y vicisitudes de los españoles (in Spanish). Prologue by Santos Juliá. Notes by J.M. Villarías Zugazagoitia (2nd ed.). Barcelona: Tusquets Editores. ISBN 978-84-8310-760-7.
