= Monument to Calvo Sotelo =

- Monumento a Calvo Sotelo
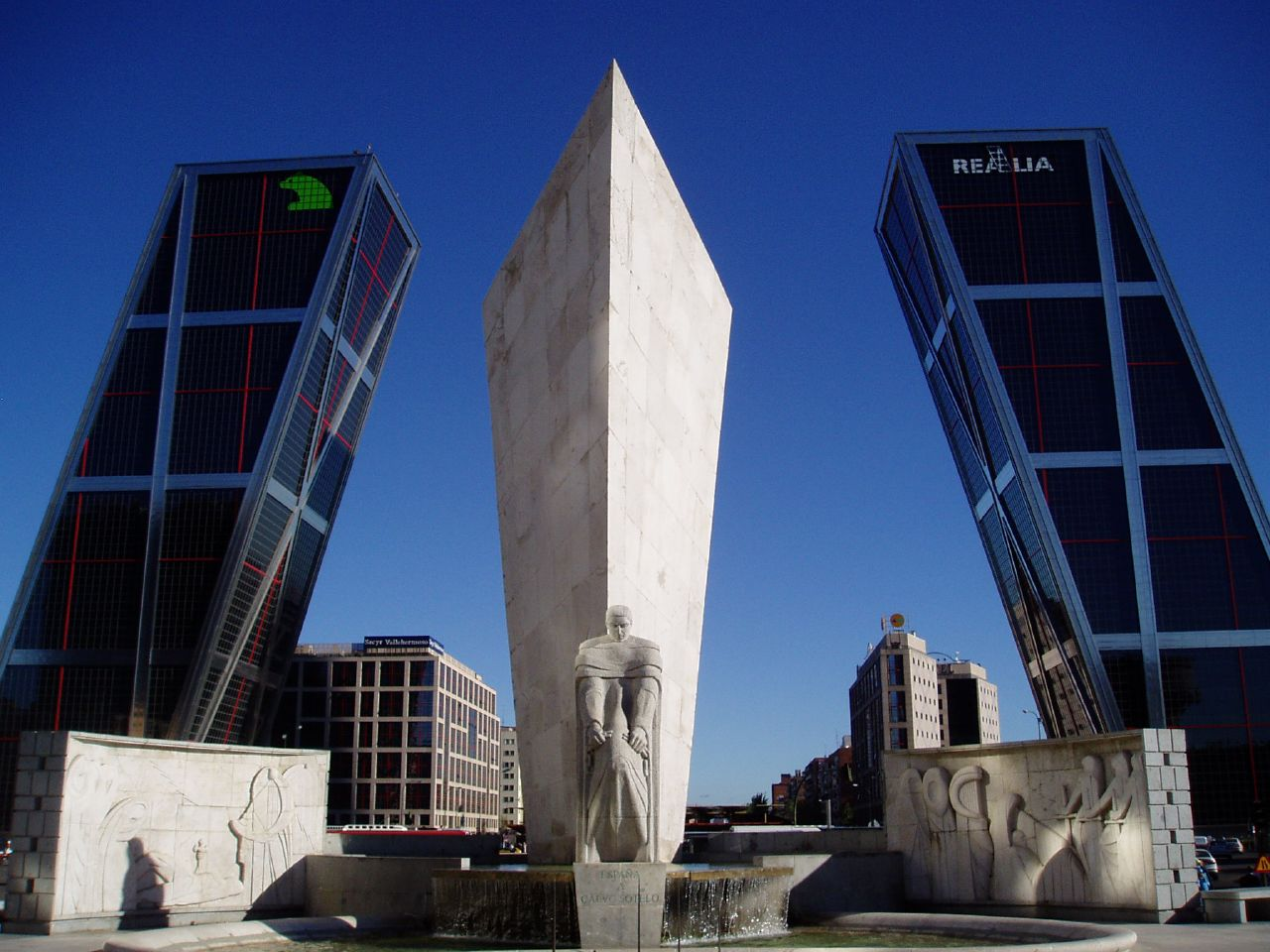
- Interactive map of Monument to Calvo Sotelo
- Location: Plaza de Castilla, Madrid, Spain
- Coordinates: 40.465239°N 3.689416°W
- Designer: Manuel Manzano-Monís (architect); Carlos Ferreira de la Torre (sculptor)
- Material: Reinforced concrete
- Opening date: 13 July 1960
- Dedicated to: José Calvo Sotelo

The Monument to Calvo Sotelo (Spanish: Monumento a Calvo Sotelo) is an instance of public art located in Madrid, Spain. Erected on the south of the Plaza de Castilla, it is dedicated to José Calvo Sotelo, who was assassinated shortly before the outbreak of the Spanish Civil War.

== History and description ==
The monument was an initiative of the "National Junta" for the homage to the Glorious Proto-Martyr of the Crusade Don José Calvo Sotelo" [sic], an entity reanimated in 1954 by the Francoist dictatorship in order to resume earlier Burgos government's projects dating back to 1938 intending to commemorate the aforementioned politician and delayed by the then ongoing state of war.

The location of the monument was decided in 1958. Commissioned to Manuel Manzano-Monís (architect) and Carlos Ferreira de la Torre (sculptor), the monument fuses the aesthetics of Italian fascism with the Spanish vanguard of the time.

Made of reinforced concrete, the single written inscription on the material reads España a Calvo Sotelo ("Spain to Calvo Sotelo").

It was unveiled on 13 July 1960. It was slightly relocated in 1992 during the works of reform of the Plaza de Castilla and put on a raised platform in the south end of the plaza. Its frontal perspective generates an axis of symmetry with the Puerta de Europa twin towers.

The monument has sparked several controversies, especially regarding the inconvenience for its permanence in the square.

== See also ==
- Assassination of José Calvo Sotelo
