= Luis Romero (novelist) =

Spanish novelist

Luis Romero (1916–2009) was a Spanish novelist. He was born in Barcelona. He wrote two dozen books in a literary career spanning four decades. He won the Premio Nadal in 1951 for his novel La noria and the Premio Planeta in 1963 for El cacique. He wrote a well-received biography of the artist Salvador Dalí (Todo Dalí en un rostro, 1975). He also published a couple of histories of the Spanish Civil War, Tres días de julio in 1967, and Por qué y cómo mataron a Calvo Sotelo in 1982. The latter work won the Premio Espejo de España. Late in his career, he won the Ramon Llull Novel Award for his novel Castell de cartes.

== Works ==
=== Spanish ===
- Cuerda tensa (1950)
- La Noria (1951)
- Ha pasado una sombra (1953)
- Carta de ayer (1953)
- Las viejas voces (1955)
- Los otros (1956)
- Libro de las tabernas de España (1956)
- Esas sombras de trasmundo (1957)
- Tudá (Allá) (1957)
- La noche buena (1960)
- La corriente (1962)
- El cacique (1963)
- Tres días de julio (1967)
- Desastre de Cartagena (1971)
- Todo Dalí en un rostro (1975)
- El final de la guerra (1976)
- Cara y cruz de la República (1980)
- Por qué y cómo mataron a Calvo Sotelo (1982)
- Aquel Dalí (1984)
- Dedálico Dalí (1989)
- Salvador Dalí (1992)

=== Catalan ===
- La finestra (1956)
- El carrer (1959)
- Castell de cartes (1991)
