= Carlos Ferreira de la Torre =

Spanish sculptor

Carlos Ferreira de la Torre (1914–1990) was a Spanish sculptor.

Ferreira was born in Madrid and spent his childhood in Tarragona, Madrid, Getafe, Corunna and Toledo, finally settling in Madrid in 1934. He did not complete his studies in fine art or the physical sciences.

In 1948, with financial assistance from the French government, he went to Paris, and in 1951 he returned to Spain, with a grant from the Spanish Commission for Cultural Relations. In 1951 he had shows in Madrid, Barcelona and Bilbao together with Ferrant, Jorge Oteiza and Serra.

His work is scattered all over Spain, especially in Madrid, in the open air and in private collections. He has twice taken part in the Venice Biennale (1950 and 1956). In Barcelona, in addition to Maternitat ("Maternity"), he has a relief measuring 1.75 x 1.20 metres (5' 8" x 3' 11") in a branch of the Banco Guipuzcoano, executed in 1959.

In the 1970s he settled in Puerto de la Cruz, Tenerife.
