= Juan Antonio Ansaldo =

Spanish monarchist and aviator

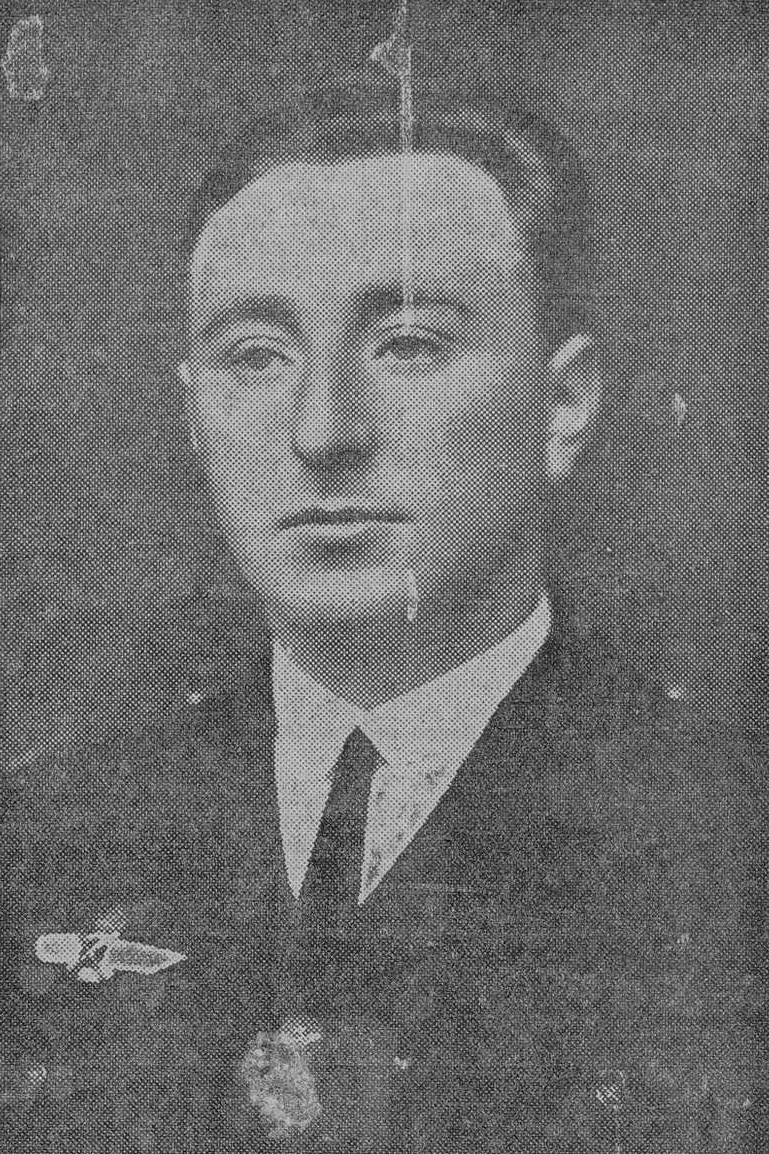
- Born: Juan Antonio Ansaldo y Vejarano; 24 June 1901; Aretxabaleta, Gipuzkoa, Spain
- Died: 29 April 1958 (aged 56); Ville-d'Avray, France
- Occupation: Pilot
- Employer: Spanish Air Force
- Notable work: ¿Para que... (1951)
- Title: Colonel
- Political party: Acción Española, Falange

Juan Antonio Ansaldo y Vejarano (24 June 1901 – 29 April 1958) was a Spanish monarchist and aviator. He was a lifelong friend and supporter of José Sanjurjo, the senior of the three generals who launched the coup of July 1936, which started the Spanish Civil War. When Sanjurjo needed to be flown in from Portugal, he chose Ansaldo as his pilot, but the overloaded plane crashed on take-off, which killed the general. Ansaldo would later fall from grace with Francisco Franco and go into exile.

== Early life and career ==
Born in Aretxabaleta, Gipuzkoa into a noble family, his father being the Viscount of San Enrique, Ansaldo joined the army air service (Aviación Militar) to fight in the Rif War. On 22 March 1924, in a combined operation with a squadron of De Havilland DH-4 commanded by Joaquín Loriga, his unit, composed of Bristol F.2 Fighters, destroyed a Dorand AR.2, the only plane held by the Republic of the Rif, and hidden by the Rifians at Tizzi Moren, southwest of Alhucemas. Ansaldo was wounded by small-arms fire during this action. In September 1925, Ansaldo's squadron air support was key to the relief of the Spanish stronghold of Kudia Tahar, east of Tetouan, and, just a few days later, his unit took part of the already ongoing Alhucemas landing. Ansaldo remained in the army air service until 1931 and the proclamation of the Second Spanish Republic, and retired with the rank of major.

A great admirer of Charles Maurras and his Action française, Ansaldo flirted with various shades of far-right politics before and during the Spanish Civil War. A member of Ramiro de Maeztu's Acción Española, he was a devoted follower of the monarchist General José Sanjurjo. By 1932 Ansaldo's holiday home in Biarritz was playing host to various leading monarchists, and the group grew close to the Unión Militar Española, which was planning to overthrow the republican government. Ansaldo was also a founder and leading member of Renovación Española, another group dedicated to restoring the monarchy in the Alfonsist tendency.

Ansaldo visited Fascist Italy the same year in an attempt to drum up support for the conspiracy, particularly from fellow aviator Italo Balbo, with whom he had contact. He and José Calvo Sotelo would make a return visit the following year, but neither trip produced any concrete results. However, Ansaldo's efforts in that and other areas raised a total of 3 million pesetas to fund the conspiracy.

In 1934, Ansaldo was at the centre of a coup plot in which it was arranged for him to fly Sanjurjo back from exile in Portugal. The plan was for Sanjurjo to link up with Juan Yagüe and to lead a coup. The plotters waited at the philologist Pedro Sainz Rodríguez's house, but word came through from Francisco Franco that the time was not right and so Ansaldo's mission was abandoned.

Ansaldo was again called into action in July 1936 when it appeared that Franco was wavering in his command, and General Emilio Mola ordered Ansaldo to pick up Sanjurjo from Portugal and fly him to Morocco to relieve Franco of his command. The plan was again abandoned, however, when Franco returned to action a few days later.

== Fascism ==
Although a monarchist, Ansaldo was drawn to the violent action and adventurism of fascism and as such maintained close links with such groups. He helped to fund both the Juntas de Ofensiva Nacional-Sindicalista and the Movimiento Sindicalista Española in the early 1930s and personally favoured the latter movement, which owed more to Blackshirts of Italian fascism in its character. With both of the groups floundering, he turned his attentions instead to the Falange and formally joined the group in early 1934. He became jefe de commandos and took charge of the so-called Falange de la Sangre militia squads engaged in responding to the leftist attacks.

In that capacity, Ansaldo became noted for his extreme violence not only for preventing any socialist activity in Madrid on May Day 1934 but also for his proclaimed intention of killing any of his own men suspected of betraying the Falange. Nonetheless, Ansaldo did not abandon his earlier monarchist principles and hoped to turn the Falange to that ideology. To that end, he conspired to edge Primo de Rivera out of his position of leadership, which led to his expulsion from the movement in 1934. He went into voluntary exile in France after this setback but continued to be closely involved in monarchist plotting from his new base.

== Sanjurjo crash ==
In late July 1936, Ansaldo was finally called by General Mola to transport his mentor from exile in Estoril. Flying only a small biplane, the flight hit difficulty when Sanjurjo, who was a very heavy man to begin with, insisted on carrying a large amount of luggage with him. Heavily weighed down, the plane crashed just after takeoff, which killed Sanjurjo.

Ansaldo survived the crash but suffered extensive injuries. The incident was to Franco's advantage as one of his two main rivals to power, the other being Mola, was eliminated.

== Later life ==
Ansaldo returned to action during the Civil War, serving with the Nationalist air force in the northern campaign. Following the Civil War, Ansaldo continued his career in the Spanish Air Force, and rose to the rank of colonel by 1940. He served as an air attaché to the United Kingdom and then Vichy France. By then, Ansaldo had become firmly estranged from Franco and was involved in a futile conspiracy with Eugenio Vegas Latapié to restore the monarchy. He launched further clandestine initiatives with Alfredo Kindelán and other monarchists when it became clear that Franco then had no intention of restoring the monarchy.

He was exiled from Spain in 1945 when Franco purged leading monarchists. Ansaldo initially fled to Portugal, then settled in France in 1947. His disillusionment with the Franco regime was reflected in his 1951 memoir ¿Para que... (For What...?) in which he criticised El Caudillo for betraying the war against the republicans by not restoring the monarchy. He died in Ville-d'Avray in 1958.
