= Academy of Military Engineering of Guadalajara =

Military academy in Spain

Coordinates: 40°38′12″N 3°10′12″W

- Academia de Ingenieros de Guadalajara
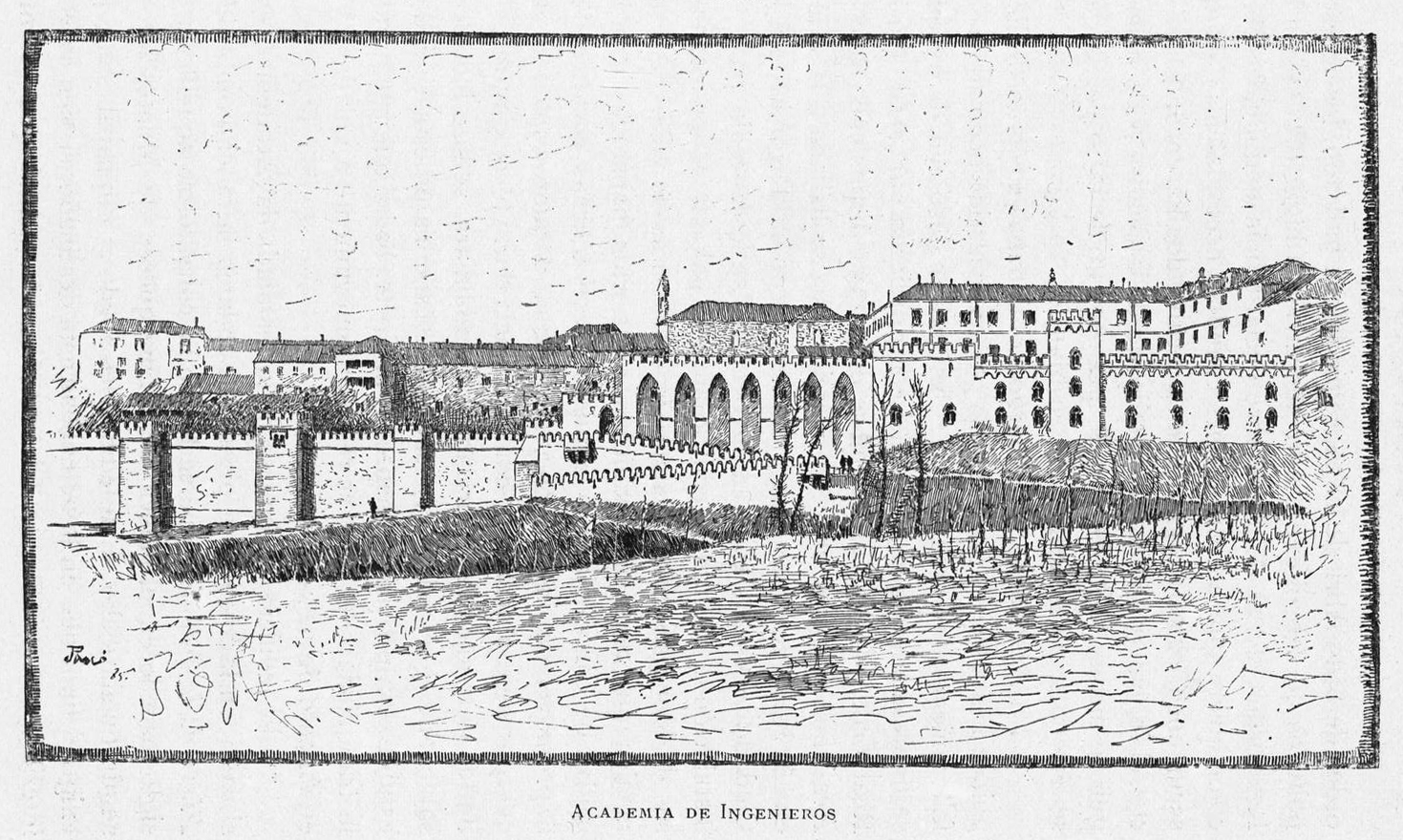
- Type: Military academy
- Active: 1833–1932; 94 years ago
- Location: Palace of Antonio de Mendoza, Guadalajara, Spain

The Academy of Military Engineering of Guadalajara (Spanish: Academia de Ingenieros de Guadalajara) was a military academy of the Spanish Army. It was located in Guadalajara, Spain and operated from 1833 to 1932.

The academy specialized in the training of military engineers and was recognized for its focus on technological and scientific education. In 1932, it was merged with the Artillery Academy (Academia de Artilleros), resulting in its relocation to Segovia.

This institution played a significant role in the professional development of military engineers within the Spanish Army during its operation.

The Academy was located in the Montesclaros Palace, in the west of the city, until a 1924 fire destroyed part of the premises and an important collection of models, documents, books, and artworks. Between 1924 and its final move, its activities were continued in the palace's annex buildings that today serve as the General Military Archive of Guadalajara (Archivo General Militar de Guadalajara) and the Palace of Antonio de Mendoza.

A total of 115 graduating classes were trained at the academy, producing 2,213 engineering officers. Some of these officers contributed to the early development of Spanish military aeronautics. Notable individuals who served as instructors or studied at the institution include Mariano Barberán, Eduardo Barrón, Alejandro Goicoechea, Emilio Herrera Linares, Alfredo Kindelán, José Ortiz Echagüe, Carlos Faraudo and Pedro Vives Vich.

== History ==
=== Origins ===
The academy began operations on September 1, 1803, in the former Basilios College of Alcalá de Henares. Its establishment was among the key objectives of a series of reforms initiated by General Engineer José Urrutia de las Casas and approved by Charles IV.

The academy’s curriculum included four annual courses: one preparatory year followed by three specialized sessions. The preparatory course covered Algebra, Differential and Integral Calculus, Hydrodynamics, and Fortification. The second year addressed Artillery, Mines, Siege and Defense of Fortifications, Encampment Organization, and Strategy. The third year focused on Optics, Perspective, Spherical Trigonometry, Geography, Astronomy, Topography, and Civil Architecture. Instruction was further supplemented by drawing classes and weapons training.

During the War of Independence, professors and students of the Academy temporarily relocated from Alcalá to Cádiz, where a provisional academy operated from 1811 to 1814. Afterward, the academy was reestablished in Alcalá de Henares. In 1820, its members aligned with the liberal cause; in 1823, facing the advancing forces of the Duke of Angoulême, they moved to Granada, later continuing to Málaga to escape the threat posed by the troops of the Hundred Thousand Sons of St. Louis. On September 27, 1823, the Regency issued an order dissolving the academy. The following year, on April 23, 1824, King Ferdinand VII issued another order, establishing the General Military College in Segovia to replace the defunct academy.

In 1826, General Engineer Ambrosio de la Cuadra secured the issuance of a Royal Order, dated August 20, which led to the reopening of the Academy of Engineers in Madrid. From that time until 1833, the academy’s headquarters moved periodically among the towns of Ávila, Talavera de la Reina, and Arévalo.

=== The Academy in Guadalajara ===
By a Royal Order dated September 13, 1833, the Academy of Engineers was permanently established in Guadalajara. The institution occupied the former Royal Cloth Factory, located in the Montesclaros Palace. The facility’s open, adaptable interior spaces accommodated both the academy’s instructional and administrative functions. A nearby area in the Coquín ravine provided space for additional activities. The Montesclaros Palace was an older structure, shaped by various expansions and renovations; the most recent occurred in 1778 under the direction of the architect Diego García.

Between 1837 and 1839, following the instability caused by the First Carlist War, the academy relocated its classrooms to Madrid. Upon returning to Guadalajara in 1839, new regulations were introduced.

Between 1843 and 1860, when Antonio Remón y Zarco del Valle served as General Engineer, the academy experienced its most productive period. During these years, faculty delegations frequently visited equivalent institutions in allied countries. These visits facilitated exchanges of ideas, incorporation of new theories, and the acquisition of updated texts and precision instruments for the academy’s curriculum.

During this period, concerns emerged regarding the academy’s continued presence in Guadalajara. In 1864, due to visible deterioration in sections of the renovated Montesclaros Palace, a commission was formed to assess the extent of structural problems. The findings prompted proposals for a new academy building, not only in Guadalajara, but also in Madrid and Zaragoza. In response, the Guadalajara City Council initiated efforts to maintain the institution locally, ultimately securing a Royal Order on May 28, 1867, ensuring its continuation in the city.

Construction work, overseen by engineering officer Juan Puyol, lasted from November 14, 1867, to December 24, 1869. During this interval, students continued their training at the adjacent San Carlos barracks. To finance the project, both the Provincial Council of Guadalajara and the City Council contributed significant funds, amounting to 110,000 escudos.

In 1879, another renovation project began, focusing on the 18th-century structures atop the Coquín ravine, which were partially supported by the remnants of the medieval city wall. Engineer Commander Federico Vázquez Landa oversaw the work, designing a pavilion modeled after the architectural style of the papal palaces in Avignon and reconstructing a section of the city wall with certain Mudéjar-influenced features.

In 1888, the academy expanded its facilities with the construction of a riding school, based on a design prepared in 1881 by then-Captain José Marvá y Mayer. This structure remains in existence.

In 1905, a new renovation was initiated, focusing on the main façade. The proposal involved removing the mezzanine beneath the roof to create taller rooms and adjusting the enclosure wall to feature vertically proportioned windows. Captain Ramón Valcárcel López-Espila adopted a historicist approach with classical tendencies, incorporating various lintel designs, simulated ashlar masonry, giant pilasters, balustrades, and a newly proportioned tower.

By 1909, the renovation work provided the academy’s headquarters in the Montesclaros Palace with a new appearance. Its updated design was comparable in style to prominent civil institutions in Guadalajara, as well as to the architectural approaches employed by Ricardo Velázquez Bosco in projects commissioned by the Duchess of Sevillano.

== Fire and Relocation ==
On the night of February 9, 1924, a fire severely damaged the Montesclaros Palace, sparing only the riding arena and the buildings situated along the Coquín ravine.

During the fire, the Construction, Chemistry, Mineralogy, Photography, and Physics rooms and their respective collections were lost. These included measuring and precision instruments, specialized models, mineral and fossil collections, and the institution’s historical archive. In addition, the Throne Room—with its extensive series of Military Engineers’ portraits—was destroyed, as was the library housing more than 28,000 volumes. Among these volumes were numerous incunabula originating from the historic Academy of Mathematics of Barcelona.

On the day following the fire, the President of the Council of Ministers, Miguel Primo de Rivera, and other members of the Military Directory visited the site. On Monday, at one o’clock in the afternoon, King Alfonso XIII arrived and expressed regret over the extensive damage, assuring the mayor that the burned building would be reconstructed. Ernesto Villar Peralta submitted the reconstruction plan on April 10 of that year. However, the work was ultimately limited to certain expansions in the orchard area. Some classrooms were accommodated in the rooms of the Palace of Antonio de Mendoza, which at that time housed the Provincial Council and the Secondary Education Institute.

In 1928, a new order reorganized military education, requiring individuals seeking training as engineers to split their study period between Zaragoza and Guadalajara. Following the proclamation of the Second Republic, the order of July 4, 1931, abolished the General Academy and merged the Academy of Engineers into the Artillery Academy, based in Segovia. This decision led to the transfer of the Academy of Engineers to Segovia.

After the Spanish Civil War, the Guadalajara City Council attempted, without success, to secure the return of the Academy of Engineers. The institution was subsequently established in Burgos and, in 1968, was permanently relocated to Hoyo de Manzanares. Meanwhile, the Infantry Academy occupied facilities belonging to the Foundation of San Diego de Alcalá in Guadalajara while its original location in Toledo underwent reconstruction.
