= Accidentalism and catastrophism =

Inter-war Spanish ideologies

Accidentalism and catastrophism were two differing ideologies in Spain in the inter-war period. They were particularly noticeable among opponents of Spain's Second Republic (1931–1939) – most significantly of the liberal and socialist governments of 1931–1933 and 1936 until the start of the Spanish Civil War. The opposition press and groups tended to fall into one of the categories, which would both hold sway during the period of the Republic.

Accidentalists believed that the faults of the Republic (and other types of government, like the preceding monarchy) were not based in the institution itself, but rather in the way it was being run. There was no fundamental flaw, and so means to improve Spain could be taken within the framework of the current system. The acts of a particular government were the only important thing. It was associated with legalism.

Catastrophists believed that the problems with the Republic ran deep. This led them to conclude it should be overthrown, and replaced with another system – exactly what depended on the nature of the catastrophist group. Ultimately, the Spanish coup of July 1936 would represent a catastrophist insurrection, and would start the civil war. There were three main groups of catastrophists: the Carlists, the Alfonsine monarchists and the Falangists. The Carlists were the monarchist supporters of the claim of Infante Carlos and his descendants, with a militia called the Requeté. The Alfonsine monarchists, who gathered around Renovación Española, wanted a return to the military government of General Primo de Rivera and the monarchy, and ran the journal Acción Española. The Falangists, were embodied from 1933 by the Falange. Of the three groups, the Alfonsine monarchists were the best financed and most influential; the Falangists created the most disorder.

The Spanish Confederation of the Autonomous Right's (CEDA) victory in the elections of 1933 was seen as a triumph for democratic means, and accidentalist opposition to the previous government. Catastrophic opposition was eclipsed temporarily, but continued to wait in the wings. In contrast, the elections in 1936, when the political right was beaten by the Popular Front (with allegations of electoral fraud), represented the futility of the accidentalist approach, and heralded the start of a period where opposition was mostly catastrophic in nature. After the election José Calvo Sotelo became the leading speaker of the anti-revolutionary right in the Parliament, being later assassinated, which prepared the mood of the right wing masses for a coup d'état. The culmination of the 1936 coup resulted in the start of the civil war, which would be considered a success of catastrophism.

== Sources ==
- González Calleja, Eduardo (2016). "Los discursos catastrofistas de los líderes de la derecha y la difusión del mito del "golpe de Estado comunista"". El Argonauta Español. 13. ISSN 1765-2901.
- Meneses, Filipe Ribeiro de (2001). Franco and the Spanish Civil War. London and New York: Routledge. ISBN 0-415-23925-7.
- Preston, Paul (2006). The Spanish Civil War: Reaction, revolution and revenge (3 ed.). HarperCollins. ISBN 0-00-723207-1.
