= Fernando Condés =

Spanish military officer (1906–1936)

Fernando Condés Romero
- Born: 1906; Lavadores, Spain
- Died: 23 July 1936 (aged 29–30) Somosierra, Spain
- Allegiance: Kingdom of Spain; Second Spanish Republic
- Branch: Guardia Civil
- Conflicts: Rif War; Revolution of 1934; Spanish Civil War

Fernando Condés Romero (1906 in Lavadores, Vigo – July 23, 1936 in Somosierra) was a Spanish military officer of the Civil Guard. Linked to the PSOE, he was an instructor for socialist militias and led the group of police and civilians who illegally detained the right-wing deputy José Calvo Sotelo, with the aim of assassinating him, which happened a few moments after removing him from his home.

== Life ==
=== Early years ===
Fernando Cóndes, being the son of an infantry commander, followed his father into the military and was assigned to the Spanish Protectorate of Morocco, which was embroiled in war, where he met José del Castillo Sáenz de Tejada. In 1928, he entered the Civil Guard and at his destination in the Civil Guard Automobile Park in Madrid he met the deputy for Badajoz Margarita Nelken, of whom he was a great friend, and who introduced him to the leader of the UGT Amaro del Rosal and this to Largo Caballero.

=== Second Republic ===
A member of the PSOE, like his friends Lieutenant Castillo and Captain Faraudo, Cóndes took part in the revolutionary attempt in October 1934, organized by the socialist organizations, whose goal was to try to occupy the Civil Guard Automobile Park with the support of the Castillo's Infantry, without succeeding. Condés was tried, convicted, expelled from the Civil Guard, and sent to a military prison.

With the triumph of the Popular Front in the February 1936 elections, he was amnestied, reinstated, and promoted, by ladder, to the rank of captain, although the Civil Guard left him in a situation of forced availability, due to his participation in the events of October 1934. He also joined, along with del Castillo and Faraudo, the Republican Anti-Fascist Military Union (UMRA). After his release from prison, he was an instructor for "La Motorizada", a youth organization made up of members of the Madrid Socialist Youth who had not participated in the merger with the communist youth to form the Unified Socialist Youth and that, among other functions, served usually to escort Indalecio Prieto. Lieutenant Castillo was also one of the instructors for "La Mortorizada".

=== The murders of Faraudo, Castillo and Calvo Sotelo ===
On 7 May, Captain Faraudo was assassinated by Falangist gunmen, a fact that caused great commotion among his entourage, in the socialist youth, and in the left parties in general. On 12 July, unidentified gunmen killed Lieutenant Castillo. That morning they congregated in the barracks of the Assault Guard of Pontejos belonging to the socialist militias, among whom was Condés. There was also a friend of Condés, Santiago Garcés and other members of the Motorizada, such as Luis Cuenca Estevas.

From Pontejos, a truck left with a group of Assault guards, members of the socialist militias and Condés himself. Lists of suspected Falangists to arrest had been given at the police station. Amid the outrage, many clamored for revenge for this and other killings by right-wing gunmen. Under the pretext of conducting a search, and under the credentials of the Civil Guard of Condés, he and some others entered the house of the right-wing and monarchist deputy José Calvo Sotelo, who they asked to accompany them to the General Directorate of Security (DGS). Calvo Sotelo resisted, but was reassured when he saw Condés's identification that accredited him as a Civil Guard officer. Finally he agreed and went with the police to the DGS. In the middle of the journey, Luis Cuenca Estevas, a member of the socialist militias, sitting just behind the deputy in the vehicle, killed him from behind, firing two shots, the first in the neck. The members of the truck took Calvo Sotelo's body to the East Cemetery, where they deposited it.

At half past eight in the morning, Condés appeared at the PSOE headquarters and asked to speak to a party leader. When neither Prieto nor Lamoneda were in Madrid, the head of the PSOE secretariat office called deputy Juan Simeón Vidarte. When Vidarte arrived at the headquarters of the PSOE, Condés was pale, decomposed, "with red eyes." When Vidarte asked what was happening, Condés snapped at him: “Something terrible. Last night we killed Calvo Sotelo ”. Condés added that it had not been his intention for the trip to end with the murder of Calvo Sotelo, but that he only intended to kidnap him to take him hostage. Vidarte, who reproached him for his behavior, and when asked by Condés if he should turn himself in, told him that it would be better for him to wait and find a place to hide, if he had one, to which Condés replied: "Yes, I can hide at the house of the deputy Margarita Nelken. There they will not dare to look for me. The guard who accompanies her, as a security guard, was also in the van. ” Vidarte also showed his disgust at the murder and his refusal to defend him as a lawyer if he were to be arrested. Condés also had the opportunity to speak with Prieto after his return to Madrid, to whom he stated that he was thinking of committing suicide. Prieto hinted at his disgust and added, “Suicide would be stupid. There will be plenty of opportunities to heroically sacrifice his life in the fight that, inescapably, will begin soon, within days or within hours. ”

The next day, Luis Cuenca Estevas, Condés, and others in the van were detained by the police and questioned.

=== Spanish Civil War ===
A few days later (the military uprising that started the Spanish Civil War had already spread), Condés participated in the assault on the Montaña Barracks, then was appointed technical director of the Motorizada and fought in Somosierra with Luis Cuenca, where he died in combat, a few days after the start of the Civil War.

== Acknowledgements ==
During the Civil War, his name was given to the Popular Militia barracks installed in the San Diego church in Cartagena.
