= The New State =

1935 book by Víctor Pradera

- Author: Víctor Pradera Larumbe
- Original title: El Estado Nuevo
- Language: Spanish
- Genre: Non-fiction
- Publication date: 1935
- Publication place: Spain

The New State (Spanish: El Estado Nuevo) is a 1935 book by Víctor Pradera. It contains a political theory, intended to reveal key political laws and to propose an adequate vision of the state.

== Development ==
Pradera's political vision was clearly incepted by Vázquez de Mella, whom he considered a mentor and intellectual master. It was evolving gradually, in course of some 40 years, starting late 19th century. At first, its elements were expressed as press articles and various public addresses, including these in the Cortes. Later they also took shape of conference papers and historical books. The almost final expression of Pradera's political theory was incorporated in a series of articles printed throughout 1934, to be finally integrated in El Estado Nuevo, the book published in Madrid in 1935.

== Main Threads ==
- Man. A Man is by definition neither good (as the Pelagians would like) nor bad (as the Protestants would like), but merely weak. This results in human dependence upon God, which can not be removed. Liberal concept of a man, designed by Rousseau, is an attempt to disregard this dependence, and hence it is faulty and false. This concept is even more brought to extremes in the socialist thought, developed by Marx. Both champion the cause of an individual, free of any bonds, and by this token both lead to destruction of every civil society. The rights of a man exist not as boundless freedoms, but only when combined with duties of a man, duties towards God.
- Society. It is natural that men, in fulfillment of their duties, form different groups, e.g. families, townships, guilds and regions, which interact with one another and form a network of dependencies. This construction is topped by a nation, which is not a collection of individuals sharing the same identity, but an organically constituted society of societies. Such a nation has developed over time, as different social components were gradually fitting one to another and building a common structure. A society as described by the liberals, a set of equal individuals, is merely a theoretical concept and can not exist in practice.
- Nation. A nation is a political expression of a society. It is best constructed when evolving organically in line with traditional bonds and divine order, like the Spanish nation has. It is not possible to build a nation against these principles, by severing the old ties, which have been pulling various organic components together. An attempt to build a nation this way – like the Catalan and Basque nationalism – is doomed to failure, since the Catalans and the Basques are traditionally organic parts of the Spanish entity. Their separate features should be reflected by decentralized structure of the state, which respects regional rights. In this way the Basque and Catalan personalities, embodied in fueros, are complementary and not conflicting with the national spirit.
- Monarch. A nation might express itself either as a monarchy or a republic, though there is no doubt that only the former option is nearing perfection. As Jefe del Estado an hereditary monarch does not depend upon any oligarchy, plebiscite or any temporary and egoistic coalition of interests, while his private interests and the public interests coincide. Such a monarch might be assisted, should this prove necessary, by a set of institutions surrounding him. He is not an absolute ruler; his powers are limited by the principles of the divine order and by the social sovereignty of the components, forming the nation. Surely no liberal monarch can fulfill this role; only a monarch respecting the tradition of an organic, Catholic society can do.
- Political representation. Parties can not represent a nation properly, and Cortes should be built along different lines. It is logical that a nation is not homogeneous and is composed of various classes, which are natural, necessary and mutually dependent. The main six classes are: agriculture, industry, commerce, property, liberal professions and manual labour. Apart from them, a state structure consists of six state bodies: diplomacy, judiciary, army, clergy, aristocracy and regions. Another separate category is national bodies and corporations, which is formed by a diversity of occupations and interests. Each class should send 50 representatives to the national assembly, as should state bodies (except regions), regions and national bodies. The Cortes would hence be composed of 450 deputies.
- Legislation. The law is defined by three organs, the king, the Cortes and the council (consisting of the royal nominees). Any new proposed measure, if approved by the king, is discussed in the separate sections of the Cortes, and then agreed during a common debate. If accepted, the proposal goes before the council, which examines it from the constitutional and legal point of view. Next it goes to the king, who either approves or rejects it. In case of the latter the whole process can be repeated, but the second royal veto kills the motion definitely.
- Administration. The executive powers rest with the King and his appointees. The state nevertheless would be a fairly withdrawn structure; its principal responsibilities are safeguarding the country against foreign designs (volunteer army though conscription possible in case of urgency), ensuring internal order and safety and pursuit of justice, based on Catholic public law. The state works for the spiritual unity of a nation and is responsible for regulating educational issues, the educative function itself is principally transferred to the Church.
- Social Issues. Acute social problems, including these agonizing Spain, were principally the result of liberalism, the system which put individual rights before the common good and allowed no limits to exploiting advantages resulting from accumulation of wealth and power. Catholic principles provide a logic, and the corporativist state, with every organ of the society properly represented, provides a machinery to solve the social problems and implement mechanisms regulating distribution of wealth. These mechanisms include the right to confiscate and redistribute unused or abused private property, which though natural and just, was limited by religious and social considerations.

== Reception ==
Upon the release of El Estado Nuevo, the work was unconditionally and rather enthusiastically accepted among the Carlist intellectuals as an in-depth discourse of their ideology and a guidance for the future. Among the Spanish Right of the 1930s El Estado Nuevo made a huge intellectual impact, especially that all the competing formations, the Alfonsists from Renovacion Espanola, the Catholics from CEDA and the rapidly growing fascists from Falange were missing a comparable, detailed, integrated, visionary doctrine. The organic vision of the society and the corporativist vision of the future state were largely accepted and shared. Key differences focused on the questions of monarchy, coercive powers of state and degree of social engineering. Among the Left the vision of Pradera did not attract much attention, since Carlism and its theories were considered profoundly archaic, if not simply long dead. Some greeted El Estado Nuevo with amusement, as an utopian nonsense, rather than with hostility. On the Marxist left, be it socialist or communist, Pradera's work was considered to be fascist. In the Francoist Spain Pradera's vision was referred to with sympathy – Franco himself wrote a foreword to the 1945 edition of El Estado Nuevo – but never as an alleged theoretical foundation of the state. Today it is usually regarded as a monarchist version of the corporativist theory. Some historians consider Pradera's work a disintegration rather than integration of Carlism, the result of political amorphism of the 1930s.

== See also ==
- Víctor Pradera Larumbe
- Carlism
- Corporatism
- Second Spanish Republic
- Christian corporatism
