= UMRA =

UMRA stands for:

- Republican Antifascist Military Union (Unión Militar Republicana Antifascista), during the Second Spanish Republic
- Unfunded Mandates Reform Act of 1995, United States legislation
