= Valentín Galarza =

Spanish politician

Colonel Valentín Galarza Morante (1882 in El Puerto de Santa María – 1951 in Madrid) was a Spanish officer and right wing politician. He was associated with the monarchist tendency within the Falange Española Tradicionalista y de las Juntas de Ofensiva Nacional-Sindicalista and was critical of the Falange.

== Conspiracies ==
An early supporter of José Sanjurjo, he had been involved in his failed 1932 rebellion, although there was no adequate proof to bring prosecution. Following the uprising he became involved in attempting to secretly recruit senior officers for future action and one of those he targeted was his friend Francisco Franco. He became a founder member of the Unión Militar Española and kept the group in touch with the conspiracies already undertaken by aviator Juan Antonio Ansaldo and officer Juan Vigón. As a consequence of his wide circle of contacts he became part of the conspiratorial group of officers around Franco and Emilio Mola. He was vital to Franco personally as he was the general's link man to the UME.

In 1934, he was at the centre of a coup plot when plans were put in place for Ansaldo to fly General Sanjurjo back from exile in Portugal. The plan was for Sanjurjo to link up with Juan Yagüe and to lead a coup. However whilst the plotters waited at philologist Pedro Sainz Rodríguez's house word came through from Franco that the right was not yet ready and for the plan to be aborted. Galarza however remained a central figure in the conspiracies and, based as he was in the War Ministry in Madrid, he was central in passing messages between the generals in the immediate run-up to the Spanish Civil War.

== Government career ==
Galarza's leading role in plotting the uprising and his good personal relationship with Franco ensured that he was able to secure government office after the civil war. He initially served as the under-secretary of the Presidencia del Gobierno and in this role he was instrumental in keeping Franco in touch with the inner workings of government.

On 5 May 1941, he was appointed Interior Minister as Franco moved to check the growing influence of Ramón Serrano Súñer by adding leading anti-Falangists like Galarza to the cabinet. Following his appointment, Galarza was the subject of numerous attacks in the Falangist press although he hit back by dismissing all the Falangist under-secretaries in his department, most notably Dionisio Ridruejo who had written a particularly scathing article against him. However it was Galarza's anti-Falangism that also proved his undoing as his close support of José Enrique Varela led to his dismissal in 1942. Franco feared the growing power of Varela who came to the fore as an opponent of Falangism when he resigned after Falangists attacked monarchists at the Basilica of Begoña, and he sought to remove his supporters, including Galarza, from positions of influence.

== Later years ==
Following his dismissal from the cabinet, Galarza became associated with a group of monarchist dissidents on the fringes of Spain's political elite. In June 1943, he was one of a number of leading monarchists to lend their name to a manifesto sent to Franco calling on him to settle the constitutional questions by immediately restoring the monarchy. The plan was rejected however, and Galarza was one of the signatories to be dismissed from the Cortes Generales for their involvement.
