= Víctor Pradera Larumbe =

Spanish political theorist and Carlist politician

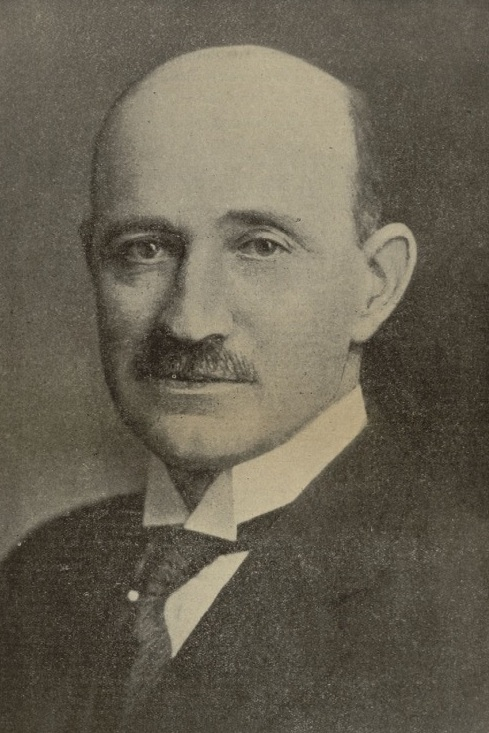
- Born: Juan Víctor Pradera Larumbe; 19 April 1872; Pamplona
- Died: 6 September 1936 (aged 64); San Sebastián
- Cause of death: Execution by firing squad
- Occupation: Lawyer
- Known for: Politician
- Political party: Partido Católico Tradicionalista, Partido Social Popular, Comunión Tradicionalista

Juan Víctor Pradera Larumbe (19 April 1872 – 6 September 1936) was a Spanish political theorist and a Carlist politician.

== Family and youth ==
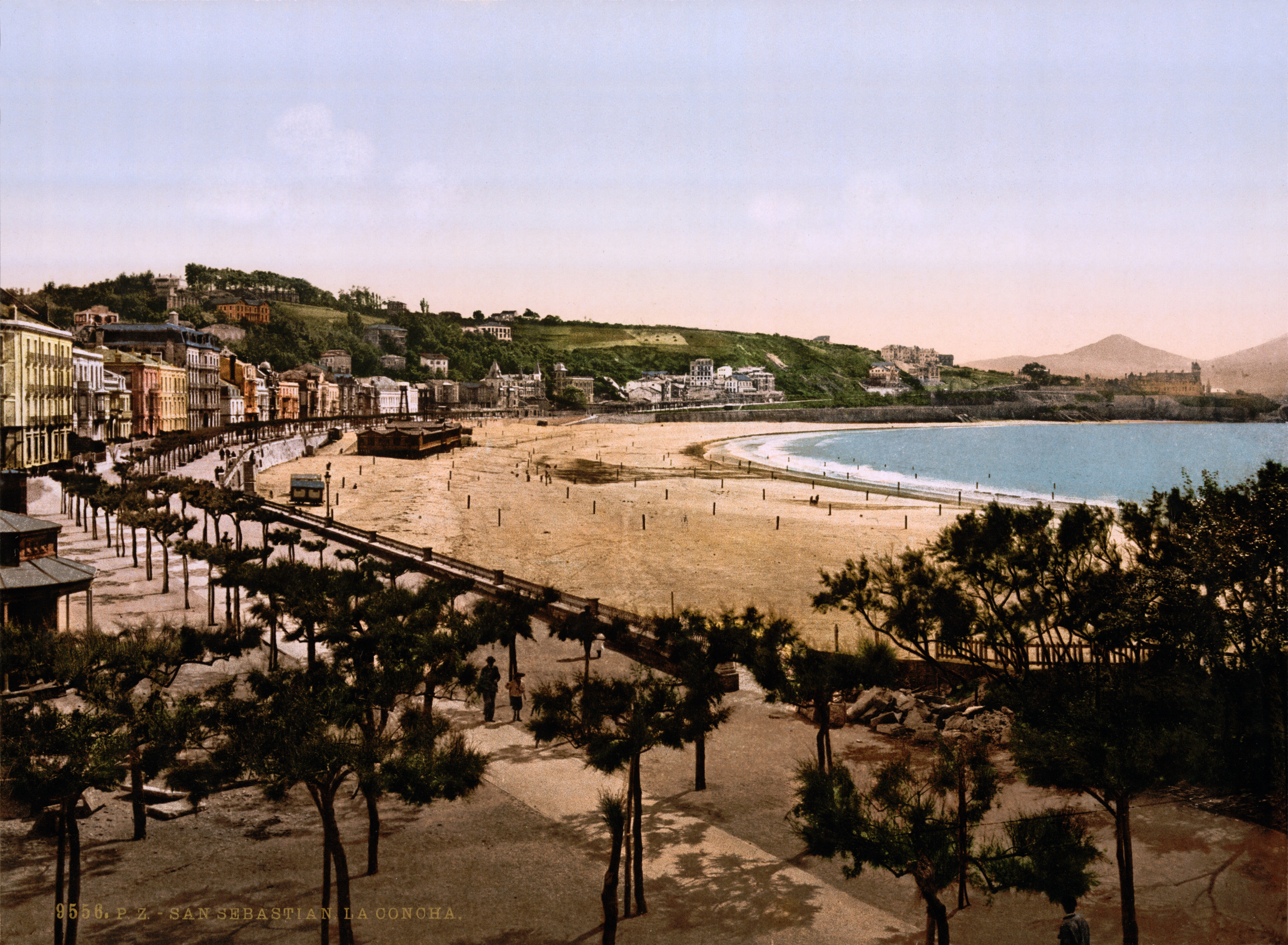
San Sebastián, late 19th century

Víctor's paternal family originated from France; his grandfather, Juan Pradera Martinena, lived in the Basque town of Sare (Labourd province), but moved across the Pyrenees and settled in Endara de Etxalar. Víctor's father, Francisco Pradera Leiza, was an indiano. As a youngster he emigrated to America and spent 16 years in Cuba; enriched, he returned to Navarre and married a pamplonesa, Filomena Larumbe, descendant to a petty bourgeoisie family. Her father, Ángel Larumbe Iturralde, sided with the legitimists during the First Carlist War and narrowly escaped execution, later to settle in Vera de Bidasoa and to practise as a notary. Juan Víctor was born as the first of four sons, Juan Víctor, Luis, Juan and Germán. In 1879 he moved with the family to San Sebastián following the professional lot of his father, who ran a commercial construction business.

Having obtained bachillerato in Instituto de San Sebastián in 1887 he spent a year in Bordeaux and then another one in Bilbao, studying at the Jesuit Deusto college and preparing for engineer studies. Having moved to Madrid Pradera entered Escuela de Ingenieros, exact year of his graduation is unknown. He returned to Gipuzkoa in 1897 and settled in Tolosa, engaged in the paper mill business of his father. Reportedly successful as a manager, Pradera later amalgamated the family enterprise into the Papelera Española trust of Rafael Picavea and became a shareholder of this company, involved in its activities until the early 20th century.

At the turn of the century he commenced studying law as an unenrolled student in Madrid, which he continued for 2 years. Having graduated, in San Sebastián he opened the law chancery and practiced as Inspector General in Cuerpo de Ingenieros de Canales y Puertos simultaneously. At unspecified date he obtained PhD in law in Madrid. In 1899 Pradera married a donostiarra, María Ortega, with whom he had 4 children, Javier to become a prominent Francoist politician. Víctor's grandson, Javier Pradera, made his name as a well-known anti-Francoist journalist and publisher, dubbed watchman of the Spanish transition to democracy.

== Young Carlist ==
During his academic years, Pradera was active in various Catholic organizations and developed interest in politics. Raised in a liberal ambience and – apart from his maternal grandfather – with no family antecedents, in the 1890s he neared Carlism as a result of his lectures; unlike most Traditionalists who inherited their outlook from forefathers, Pradera considered himself a “scientific Carlist”. Already recognized as an orator, in 1899 he was agreed to stand as an unofficial Carlist candidate in Tolosa. Benefitting from just commencing rapprochement between mainstream Carlists and the Integrists, he was elected defeating a governmental candidate; Matias Barrio appointed him speaker of the small Carlist minority.

In the aftermath of 1898 disaster Pradera formed the first wave of regeneracionistas, demanding profound if not revolutionary change. A young newcomer in the chamber, he regularly clashed with Silvela, demonstrating logic combined with oratory skills as well as hot temper. Re-elected in 1901, he went on confronting the old liberal enemies and took on the new ones, especially republican radicals and nationalists. He intended to run for re-election in the subsequent campaign of 1903, but eventually resigned due to financial issues. In 1904 Pradera was elected from Tolosa to Diputación Provincial. Together with Esteban de Bilbao Eguía and Julio Urquijo he formed a new generation of activists, promoted by the claimant Carlos VII and the party leader marqués de Cerralbo in their bid to build a modern Carlist network.

== Dissident ==
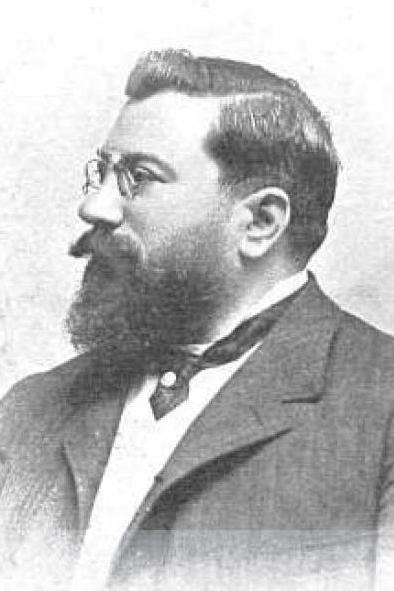
Vázquez de Mella

His deputy duties terminated, Pradera dedicated himself to family life, business and intellectual work. He remained engaged in party life, though his relations with local leadership deteriorated. In course of the 1910 electoral campaign he sought rapprochement with the mauristas and supported a stand-alone candidate; both were expelled from the party by its Gipuzkoan jefe, Tirso de Olazábal. Re-admitted in 1912, Pradera continued his career as an orator on public meetings. Addressing a wide range of issues, he was increasingly focused on confronting the emerging Basque national aspirations. As he gained a nationwide expert recognition, in 1917 de Romanones called him into extra-parliamentarian committee to discuss Catalan autonomy. Elected to the Cortes in 1918, he became the key Carlist speaker. Forging friendship with Antonio Maura, he nevertheless opposed grand but hazy coalitions aimed at preserving shaky stability of the late Restoration. Aware of the forthcoming revolutionary tide, he advocated a radical Traditionalist change.

At that time Jaimismo was increasingly paralysed by a multidimensional conflict between its key ideologue, Juan Vázquez de Mella, and the claimant himself. Pradera, who befriended de Mella and remained heavily influenced by his vision, sided with the rebels, in 1919 joining their Partido Católico Tradicionalista. Animating the Mellist Diario de Navarra, he unsuccessfully ran for the Cortes in 1919, failing also in his 1920 bid for the Senate. During final years of Restauración he was in vain lured by both partidos turnistas, offering him safe place on electoral lists and ministerial jobs; Pradera remained the PCT party jefe in Gipzukoa.

In the early 1920s Pradera's relations with de Mella deteriorated. According to one theory, Mella favored a loose federation of extreme Right parties, while Pradera opted for a new party of the Right. According to another, Mella perceived Pradera's vision as minimalist, suspecting him of hidden secularism and embracing parliamentarianism. Most detailed study available pursues the theory of orthodox de Mella disdainful to "possibilist" and "minimalist" Pradera. One more theory claims that the two clashed later and the point of contention was policy towards the Primo de Rivera dictatorship. Pradera decided to go his own way, taking a number of mellistas with him; de Mella himself, plagued by health problems and with both his legs amputated, gradually retired into private and intellectual life.

== Social-Catholic ==
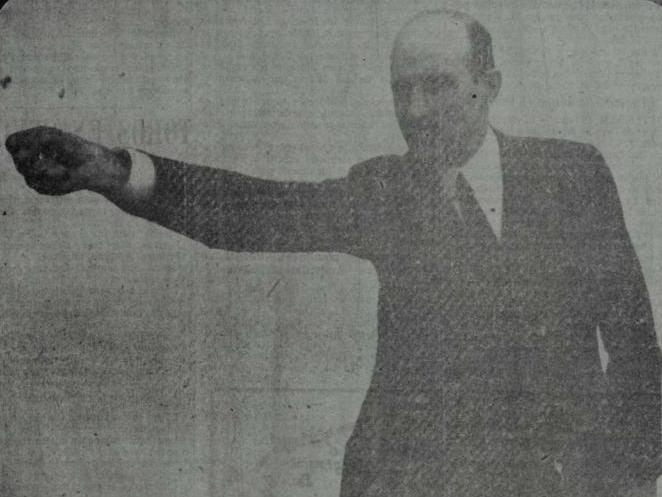
Pradera speaking

In 1922 Pradera set up Partido Social Popular, intended to be a vehicle of a new, possibilist policy making. Incompatible with the Carlist intransigence, it was envisioned as a broad alliance rather than a party. Most scholars suggest it was principally inspired by social theories of Leo XIII, at that time advanced in Spain mostly by the Zaragoza school of Salvador Minguijon; it was supposed to confront the rising socialist tide. Though the party is occasionally described as a distant preconfiguration of Christian Democracy, proto-Fascism or renewed Traditionalism, most summarise its program as social-Catholicism, modeled on the German Catholic Centre Party. The party slogan was: Religión, Patria, Estado, Propiedad y Familia. PSP opposed representation based on popular election system and advocated a corporative representation instead; Pradera appreciated good will of Christian-democrats like Herrera Oria, but claimed that their malmenorismo opens the door to revolution, he also preferred monarchism to Christian-democratic accidentalism. The PSP social program included progressive taxation and social legislation. Though some of its leaders clearly excluded ruling by force, Pradera remained rather ambiguous on this issue.

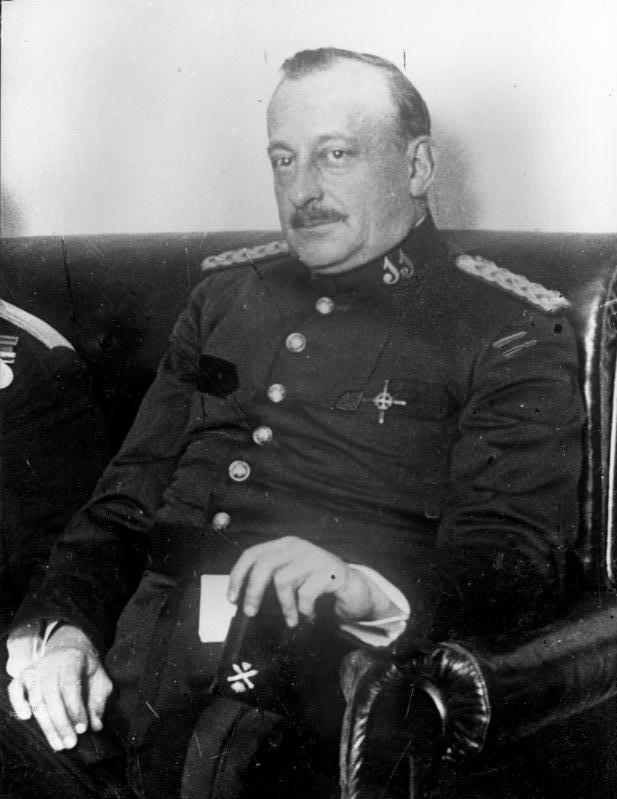
Primo de Rivera

Most “pesepistas” welcomed Primo de Rivera dictatorship; Pradera greeted him enthusiastically as a long overdue regeneracionismo. Asked by Primo for an interview, Pradera suggested that the new regime should ban all parties, introduce corporative representation, build a presidentialist government and construct a regionalist state, a vision developed further on in 4 memoranda, supplied to the dictator. Pradera engaged in advocating dictatorship in the press and remained officially Primo's assessor until 1927, when he entered Asamblea Nacional. Member of the Proyectos de Leyes Constitucionales section, he strived to institutionalize the system by working on a new constitution, conceived in line with his corporativist vision.

Pradera's intellectual contribution to Primo's rule was so eminent that he is sometimes considered a point of reference for primoderiverismo. However, his relations with the dictator deteriorated, the first controversies surfacing in 1924. Pradera was disturbed by the perceived self-adulation of Primo, preserving liberal features of the ancient regime, and generally inertia prevailing over a decisive change. He considered Union Patriotica a mistake, opposed centralization and did not agree with Calvo Sotelo on financial policy, the fiscal system in particular. Though in the late 1920s Primo was increasingly irritated by Pradera's criticism, the latter remained supportive until the very end. It was only long after the regime's fall that Pradera started to view it as a delusive spell of stability between bewilderment of the late Restauración and chaos of the Republic.

== Reconciled Carlist ==
Carlist standard

During the first republican electoral campaign of 1931 Pradera was supposed to join lista católico-fuerista, but eventually he refused to form ranks with the despised Basque nationalists and withdrew. He drew close to the Jaimistas, but remained hesitant about returning to their party. It was only after the death of Don Jaime that in 1932 Pradera decided to lead his followers and the orphaned mellistas to the united Carlist organization, Comunión Tradicionalista, entering its executive. He also became head of the newly established Council of Culture, rising into a formally acknowledged movement's intellectual leader. His career of a public servant was crowned in 1933, when he was elected to Tribunal de Garantías Constitucionales de España. In 1934 he unsuccessfully run for its presidency. In 1936 Pradera was admitted to Academia de Jurisprudencia y Legislación.

Pradera did not display a dynastical zeal; as the new claimant was an octogenarian with no issue, he considered recognising Don Juan as Carlist king. Within Comunión Pradera formed an influential minority endorsing a broad monarchical alliance with the Alfonsists. He wholeheartedly engaged in Acción Española and became vice-president of Sociedad Cultural Española, the official owner of Acción Española periodical. He then proved one of key Carlists joining Bloque Nacional, entering its executive committee and working out its manifesto, most likely a compromise between himself and Calvo Sotelo. Pradera continued confronting accidentalist Christian-democracy; his campaign against CEDA was so virulent that Carlist leaders felt pressed to call for moderation.

Initially, Pradera's drive towards a monarchist alliance was shared by the party leaders; it was rather the rank-and-file who saw no purpose mixing with debris of the hated liberal dynasty. When Alfonso Carlos replaced Tomás Domínguez Arévalo with the intransigent Manuel Fal, Pradera and the entire Junta resigned. Though Fal permitted Rodezno and Pradera to pursue their tactics on a private business basis, none of them was a match for the personality of Calvo Sotelo. As the growing feeling was that Alfonsinos were gaining the upper hand in Bloque Nacional, Fal decided to withdraw and Pradera hesitantly complied; he focused on fighting secularization, democracy, socialism, nationalism and all perceived evils of the republic as an author, publishing press articles and books.

== Theorist ==
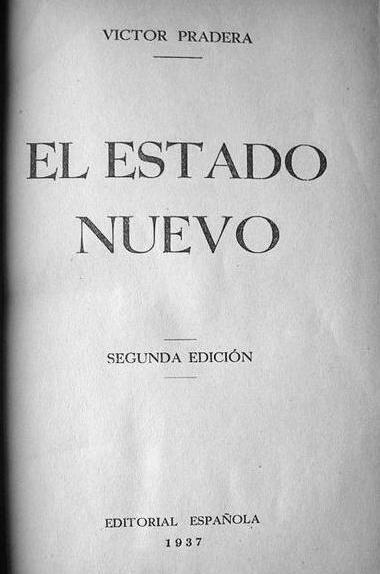
El Estado Nuevo

Pradera's political vision was taking shape in course of some 40 years, to be finally integrated in El Estado Nuevo, the book published in 1935. His theory is usually viewed as anchored in works of Vázquez de Mella, considered by Pradera the intellectual master. Other sources of inspiration listed are papal encyclicals, Maurras, Donoso Cortes and, last but not least, Thomas Aquinas.

According to Pradera, rights of a man exist only when combined with his duties towards God and are unacceptable as deified Rousseau's “human rights”. It is natural that men form different entities (e.g. families, guilds, regions etc.), which interact with one another. They are topped by a nation, which is an organically constituted society of societies. A nation is best expressed as a monarchy, its unity ensured by King and Church. Royal powers are limited by principles of divine order and by sovereignty of the nation's components. A democratic individualist representation can not express this sovereignty, which is to be voiced by an organic representation. Since parties tear every society apart, the Cortes should be composed of representatives of 6 main classes, plus delegates of various state bodies. The law is defined by the king, with auxiliary role of the Cortes and the council. The state is a fairly withdrawn structure; its principal responsibilities defined as safeguarding the country, ensuring internal order and executing justice. Catholic principles provide the logic, and the corporativist state provides the machinery to solve social problems and implement mechanisms regulating distribution of wealth. How this vision was to be achieved remained unclear.

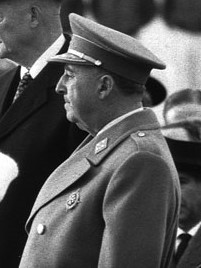
Francisco Franco

El Estado Nuevo was enthusiastically accepted among Carlists, Pradera replacing de Mella as their top theorist. Also other sections of the Spanish Right, deprived of a comparable credo, viewed the work with respect if not envy. Pradera's impact on Franco remains disputed. In the newspaper version he appears as "one of the icons and pilars of Francoism". Indeed, many scholars consider Pradera one of caudillo's masters, pointing to his prologue to the 1945 re-edition and later references; to them, Estado Nuevo is a forerunner of Francoist state and its clear theoretical lecture. Though some in-depth studies on Francoism even claim that the regime was related to Traditionalism rather than to fascism,

Contemporary scholars do not agree how Pradera's theory should be classified. Most extensive studies suggest that his vision falls somewhere between social-Catholicism and corporativism, the closest European incarnations having been Dolfuss’ Austria and Salazar's Portugal. Other options offered are traditionalism, national traditionalism, corporative neotraditionalist monarchism, organicism, reactionary authoritarianism, proto-fascism (prefascism), traditionalist fascism or simply an intellectual magma.

== Regionalist ==
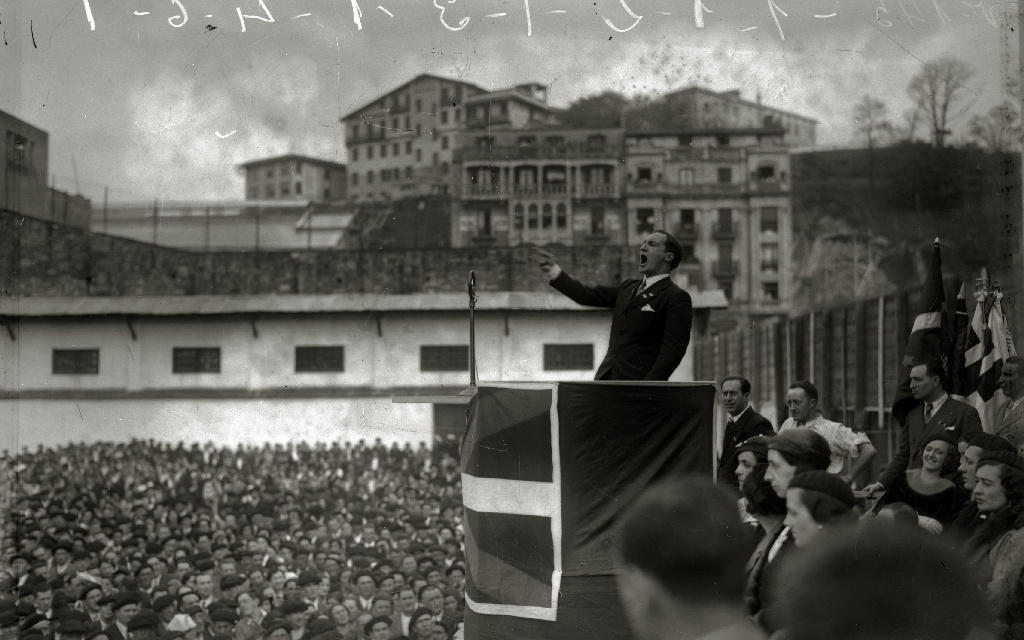
Basque nationalism: Euzkadi

The regionalist question posed an indispensable component of Pradera's theory; it also kept coming back as a major thread of his political activities. Today among many Spanish citizens – especially the Basques – Pradera is principally recognized only for his stance on this very topic, usually as a sworn enemy of national minorities.

From the onset of his career Pradera declared himself a supporter of traditional regionalism fueros, and identified himself as unswervingly regionalist. In his political vision the regions, with their specific legal, economic and social establishments, were among key entities forming a nation, and his recommendations to Primo endorsed a strongly regionalist state. The fueros, however, did not provide an autonomous legal framework, but to the contrary, they were viewed as a pact between a region and the Spanish state. Hence, he consistently fought all designs perceived as fostering separatism and embracing autonomy, confronting Liga Autonomista, lambasting Wilsonian arguments on self-determination, fighting theories advanced by Sabino Arana and Arturo Campión, thwarting autonomy projects of late Restauración, publicly admonishing Primo de Rivera for fostering separatism, fighting Vasco-Navarrese autonomy drafts during the Republic - with particular hostility to incorporating Navarre into the autonomous project - and voting against the Catalan Leases Act in Tribunal de Garantias.

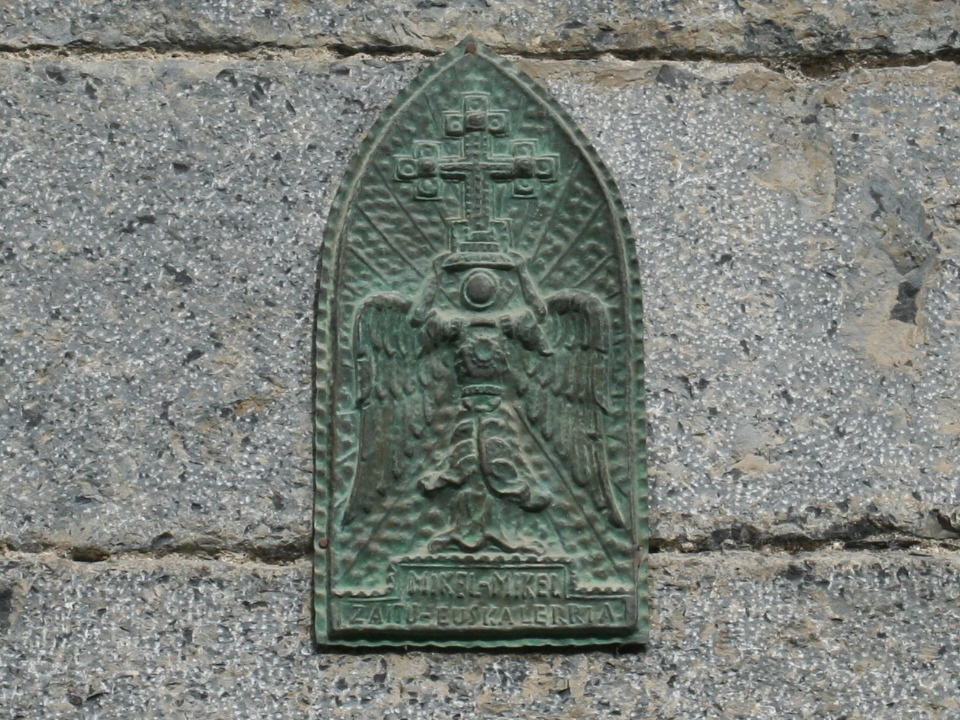
Traditionalism: Euskalerria

Pradera denied the Basques and the Catalans a separate political identity, be it historical or contemporary, and was particularly infuriated by racist thread of the Basque national discourse. Recognising their separate ethnic status, he considered the minorities "pueblos", forming part of the Spanish political nation. He remained restless denouncing what he considered invented nationalist myths and proving that the Basques had neither formed a unitarian cultural entity nor had ever possessed a common political self. As confronting Basque and Catalan political aspirations became a major thread of Pradera's activity, driven by concern for unity of Spain, he soon grew into the nationalist Basques' primary foe, accused of españolismo, hyperpatriotism and jingoism.

== Prisoner ==
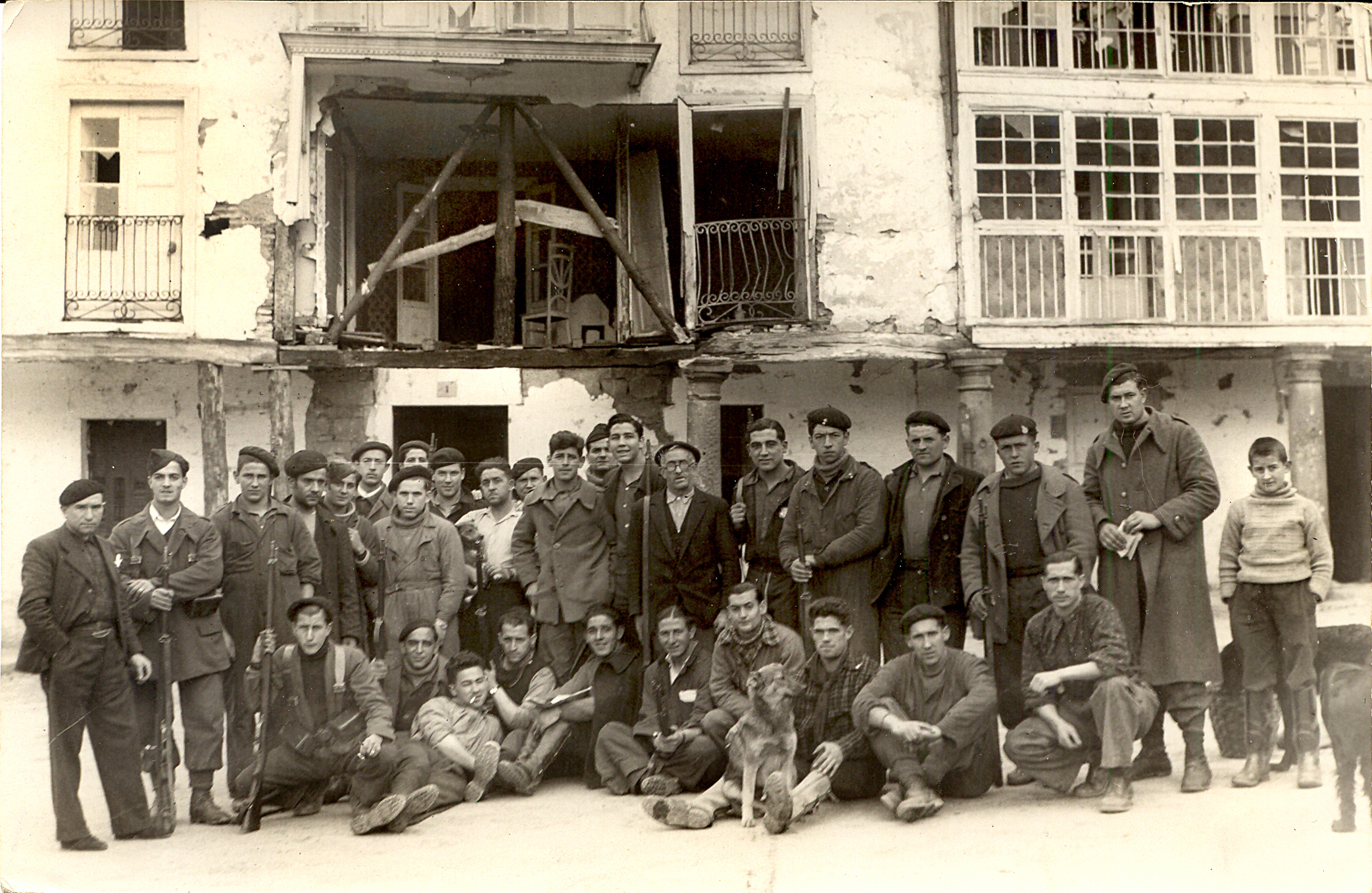
Basque republican militia, Gipuzkoa

Pradera's contribution to anti-Republican coup consisted chiefly of conducting talks with the would-be Alfonsist allies in Navarre and in the Basque provinces, though exact scale of his engagement remains unknown. In February 1936 he declined Franco's proposal to join him on Canary Islands; fully aware of the forthcoming coup and anxious not to be called a coward, he cancelled a formal visit to France, scheduled on July 13 as part of Tribunal de Garantias duties, and remained in San Sebastián. He was also anxious not to leave his daughter, who at the time was pregnant and due in short time. He is quoted as declaring to Rodezno on July 16, 1936: "Thomas, let God help us. If we fail, we will have our throats cut".

During the initial days of the insurgency, Pradera remained in San Sebastián, where the coup indeed failed; he soon found himself cut off from the nationalist zone. Early August he was arrested by the Basque militia and detained in the Ondarreta prison; his son Javier joined him soon afterwards. Accounts of his last days differ. Most studies claim he was trialed by a makeshift Tribunal Popular and was sentenced to death; other works suggest that as the city was already under the nationalist siege, the Republican militia units stormed the prison fearing the detainees might be soon set free. On September 6, within a group of other prisoners, Pradera was driven to the nearby Polloe cemetery and executed, his son meeting the same fate shortly afterwards. In 1949 Franco posthumously conferred upon Pradera the title of conde de Pradera, which is functional until today.
