= José Castillo (police officer) =

Policeman during the Second Spanish Republic (1901–1936)

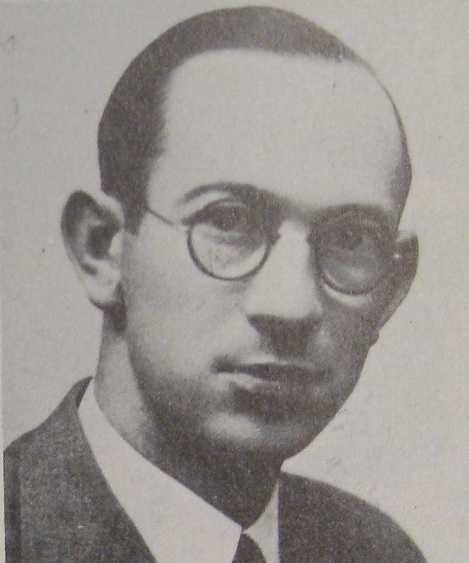
- Castillo c. 1930.
- Born: José del Castillo Sáenz de Tejada; 29 June 1901; Alcalá la Real, Spain
- Died: 12 July 1936 (aged 35); Madrid, Spain
- Known for: Being murdered by Falangists
- Police career
- Allegiance: Spain
- Department: Regulares; Guardia de Asalto
- Service years: 1919–1936
- Rank: Lieutenant

José del Castillo Sáenz de Tejada (29 June 1901 – 12 July 1936) was a Spanish Police Guardia de Asalto (Assault Guard) lieutenant during the Second Spanish Republic. His murder by four Falangist gunmen on 12 July 1936 led to a sequence of events that helped precipitate the Spanish Civil War.

== Early life and military career ==
José Castillo was the son of a lawyer of liberal political views. His mother came from an aristocratic family and was distantly related to General Miguel Primo de Rivera (Spanish dictator 1923–30). After attending school in Granada, Castillo entered the Infantry Officers' Academy in Toledo, in 1919. After graduation he became a junior officer in the 1st Regulares (Moroccan colonial troops). He saw active service in the Rif War, rising to the rank of Lieutenant. In 1925 he transferred to a Peninsular regiment of regular infantry,

== Under the Republic ==
Following the overthrow of the Monarchy in 1931, José Castillo was appointed to the newly raised Assault Guards, a para-military force intended to maintain security in urban areas and provide a counterweight to the long established and conservative Guardia Civil. Officers of the Asaltos were selected for their perceived loyalty to the new Republic. Castillo had partaken in the failed rebellion of October 1934.

Castillo was a member of the Union Militar Republicana Antifascista (UMRA), an anti-fascist organization for military members, and also worked in training the militia of the socialist youth. In April 1936, he commanded the Assault Guard unit which forcibly put down the riots that broke out at the funeral of Guardia Civil lieutenant Anastasio de los Reyes; for this, he was marked for death by the Falange. (The Guardia de Asalto were generally in favor of the Republic, the Guardia Civil more connected to what was to become the insurrectionary right-wing opposition.)

== Assassination ==
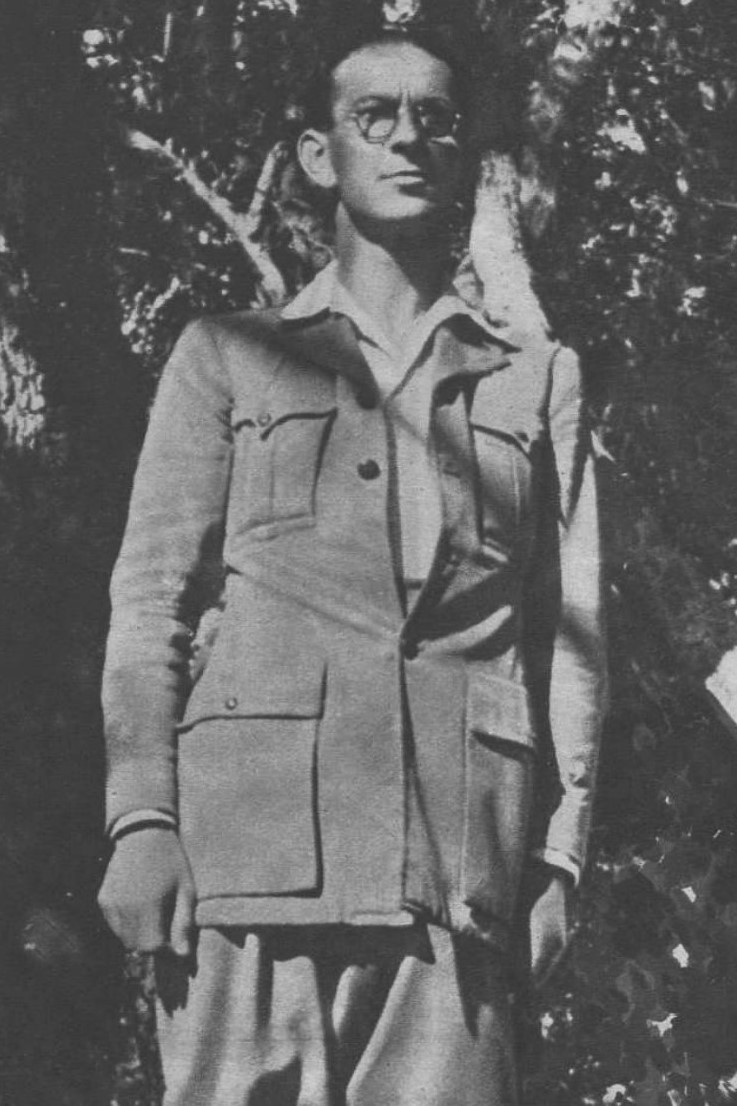
in mid-1930s

Castillo had been placed on a Falangist blacklist after he was blamed for the death of José Antonio Primo de Rivera's cousin, Andrés Sáez de Heredia. Heredia had been killed during shootouts during the funeral procession of the Civil Guard officer Anastasio de los Reyes, who had been killed in unclear circumstances during a military parade on April 14. While Reyes had no known political views, the Spanish left-wing blamed his killing on fascists, while the Spanish right-wing claimed him as one of their own and held a large funeral for him as a political demonstration against the government. Shots were fired on the funeral procession (it had been prohibited from marching through the city but had insisted on doing so anyway) and three people, including Heredia, were killed, while many more were injured, before Reyes was finally buried.

In June 1936, Castillo had married and his wife had received an anonymous letter threatening that he would soon be a corpse. He had begun training a socialist militia in the aftermath of the Reyes funeral riots. On the evening of 12 July, Castillo left his home in central Madrid to take up night duty. On the pavement outside he was killed by four men with revolvers who had waited for him through the late afternoon; the bullet holes on the surrounding wall are still visible today. The gun men escaped in the confusion amongst the late Sunday crowds and were never identified. Castillo was the second military officer with known socialist sympathies to have been murdered within five weeks (Captain Carlos Faraudo, an engineer who had been helping to train socialist militia, was killed in May). Nine Falangists were arrested in the aftermath.

== Aftermath ==
In retaliation, that night at around 03:00, Castillo's close friend Police Captain Fernando Condés and other police officers and leftist gunmen, drove to the home of José Calvo Sotelo — leader of the monarchist party and a rival of José Antonio Primo de Rivera for leadership of the Spanish far-right — and asked him to come down to the station for interrogation. Driving with Calvo Sotelo in a police van of the Assault Guard, police officer and socialist gunman Luis Cuenca shot him in the back of the neck. (According to Hugh Thomas, although Cuenca was an "intimate friend" of Condés', Condés mostly likely had no idea that Cuenca intended to kill Calvo Sotelo; as the officer with his name on the paperwork for Calvo Sotelo's arrest, Condés considered killing himself; both Condés and Cuenca were soon arrested without incident). Calvo Sotelo's dead body was given to a municipal undertaker, without informing the undertaker of who it was. Cuenca then drove to the offices of newspaper El Socialista and told them what had occurred.

As a deputy in the Cortes Sotelo had constitutional immunity from arrest and it is difficult to understand what other purpose than murder his kidnapping could have served.

Both Castillo and Calvo Sotelo were buried 14 July; fighting between Assault Guard and fascist militias broke out in the streets surrounding the cemetery of Madrid, resulting in four deaths. Three days later on 17 July, the army uprising began in Morocco.

== Widow ==
The widow, Consuelo Morales Castillo del Castillo (1913–1994), was pregnant. With her family she moved to Valencia, where in January 1937 she gave birth to a daughter. With the war approaching the end she considered moving to France, but eventually the widow remained in Valencia. In 1939 she and her parents were arrested, unclear on what charges; the child remained with Castillo's mother, then in her 90s. Having spent 9 months in the Ventas prison, Morales was set free in 1940, just in time to see her daughter – who from birth suffered heart problems – pass away. She settled in Madrid and worked in a stationery store; she has not remarried. In 1966 she applied for the widowhood pension, granted shortly afterwards by Consejo Superior de Justicia Militar. In line with standard regulations, it was equivalent to 25% of the salary. The widow appealed claiming that Castillo died when in service, which would have made her eligible for an extraordinary pension, equal to 100% of the salary. CSJM rejected her claim on basis that Castillo has been shot not in relation to his service, but in relation to his political activity. Until then living in obscurity, in 1977 she gave a large interview to El País and in 1978 she again applied for full pension, again to no avail. In 1983 the decision was subject to revision and she was granted full pension, on basis that Castillo fell victim to “atentado terrorista”. In advanced age, she was treated in military branch of the health service and died in a military hospital.

== See also ==
- Carlos Faraudo
