= Eugenio Vegas Latapié =

Spanish monarchist writer, activist and conspirator

Eugenio Vegas Latapie
- Born: Eugenio Vegas Latapie; 1907
- Died: 1985 (aged 77–78)
- Known for: Monarchist activist
- Notable work: Memorias politicas.El suicidio de la monarquia y la Segunda Republica (1983)
- Political party: Acción Española, FET y de la JONS

Eugenio Vegas Latapie (1907–1985) was a Spanish monarchist writer, activist and conspirator who was noted for the extremism of his monarchism. A native of Irun, he was a leading member of the Acción Española.

In his later years, Vegas Latapié served as Secretary and principal advisor to Don Juan de Borbón, the father of the future king Juan Carlos, whose early education he oversaw as well.

== Monarchism ==
A founder member of Acción Española, Vegas Latapié was noted for his extreme monarchism to the point that he lost faith variously in Alfonso XIII, his son Juan and grandson Juan Carlos, to whom he was a tutor, as he felt that they were not monarchist enough. A hard-line supporter of the Roman Catholic Church, he nonetheless was prepared to criticise the Papacy for not reaching his own standards, notably in a series of articles published in the Acción Española journal in 1931 and 1932 in which he attacked the supposedly conciliatory attitude towards the republicans in France.

== Conspiracies ==
After the 1936 assassination of José Calvo Sotelo, Vegas Latapié and his brother Pepe instigated a plot to murder Manuel Azaña in a revenge attack, but the plan was scuppered when they took it to their allies in the army, as it was already in an advanced stage of planning the uprising that precipitated the Spanish Civil War. His idea rejected, Vegas Latapié then decided to launch a suicide attack on the Congress of Deputies by entering the building while he was carrying a supply of mustard gas, but this plan was abandoned as well since he feared incriminating his brother Florentino, who worked for the only producer of the gas in Spain.

== Under Franco ==
Vegas Latapié had been close to the Falange and had exhorted it to greater violence in the early days of the Spanish Civil War. Alongside this, however, he had a fraught relationship with José Antonio Primo de Rivera, as he did not approve of the Falangist leader's high-living private life. They were estranged not long before Primo de Rivera's death, when Vegas Latapie attacked his "social frivolity" while Falangists were being killed.

He sat on the National Council of the Falange Española Tradicionalista y de las Juntas de Ofensiva Nacional-Sindicalista until 4 March 1938, when Francisco Franco, seeking to remove potential troublemakers, removed the abrasive and uncompromising Vegas Latapie from his position. The action led to a freezing of relations between Franco and Acción Española, as many activists saw that as a slight on their leader and so ended co-operation. Deprived of his office, he entered into a series of conspiracies against Franco with Juan Antonio Ansaldo, but since neither man was particularly popular or had good contacts, they came to nothing. He became a public critic of the Franco regime to such an extent that he was forced into exile in Switzerland for a time in June 1942.

== Later life ==
In 1946 he formed part of a coterie of advisors around Don Juan, which included the likes of Pedro Sainz Rodríguez, José María Gil-Robles y Quiñones, Julio López-Oliván and General Antonio Aranda, all of whom were involved in trying to secure restoration for the prospective king. Within the group, Vegas Latapie and Sainz Rodríguez were noted to be the most extreme and anti-democratic members.

His autobiography Memorias politicas. El suicidio de la monarquia y la Segunda Republica appeared in 1983 and revealed his disillusionment with his political career.
