= Ramiro de Maeztu =

Spanish essayist, journalist and publicist

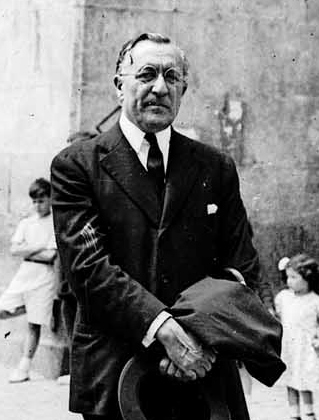
- Maeztu in 1934

Ambassador of Spain to Argentina
- In office February 1928 – February 1930

Member of the Cortes
- In office 1933–1936

Seat L of the Real Academia Española
- In office 30 June 1935 – 29 October 1936
- Preceded by: Cipriano Muñoz
- Succeeded by: Eugenio Montes

Personal details
- Born: Ramiro de Maeztu y Whitney; 4 May 1875 Vitoria, Kingdom of Spain
- Died: 29 October 1936 (aged 61) Madrid, Second Spanish Republic
- Party: Patriotic Union; National Monarchist Union; Spanish Renovation

Ramiro de Maeztu y Whitney, 1st Count of Maeztu (4 May 1875 – 29 October 1936) was a Spanish essayist, journalist and publicist.

Maeztu's early literary work ascribes him to the Generation of '98. Adept of Nietzschean and Social Darwinist ideas in his youth, he became close to Fabian socialism and later to distributism and social corporatism during his spell as correspondent in London from where he chronicled the Great War. During the years of the Primo de Rivera dictatorship he served as Ambassador to Argentina. A staunch militarist, he became at the end of his ideological path one of the most prominent far-right theorists against the Spanish Republic, leading the reactionary voices calling for a military coup. A member of the cultural group Acción Española, he spread the concept of "Hispanidad" (Spanishness). Imprisoned by Republican authorities after the outbreak of the Spanish Civil War, he was killed by leftist militiamen during a saca in the midst of the conflict.

== Early life and career ==
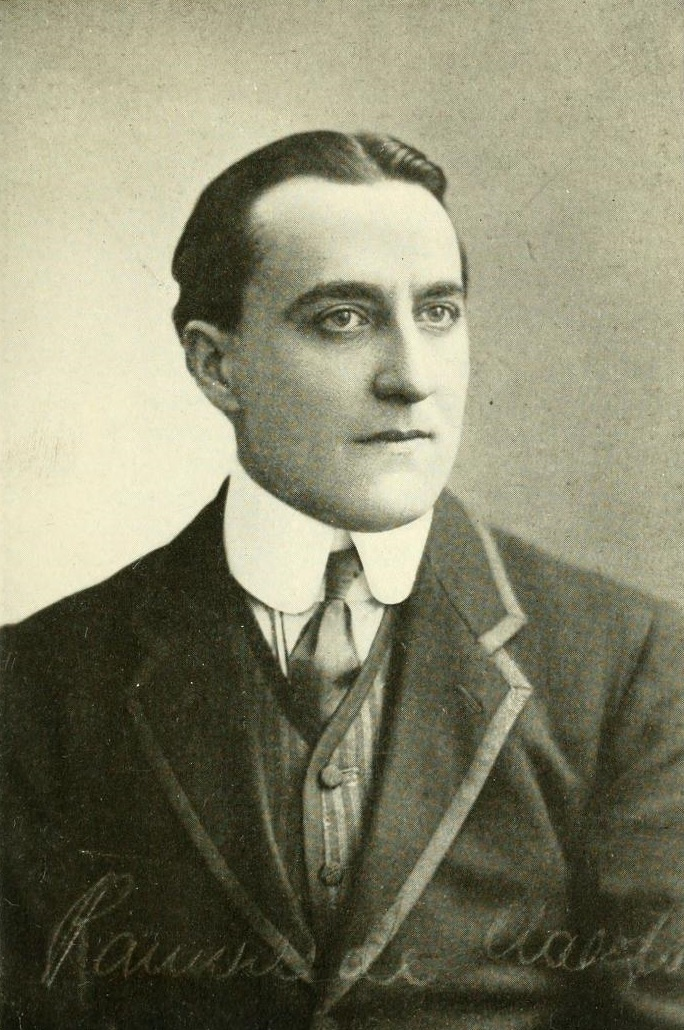
A young Maeztu

Ramiro de Maeztu y Whitney was born on 4 May 1875 in Vitoria, the capital of Álava province. He was the son of Manuel de Maeztu Rodriguez, a Cuban engineer and landowner born in Cienfuegos with ancestry from Navarre. While in Paris, he had met Ramiro's mother, Juana Whitney, born in Nice and daughter of a British diplomat, when she was 16 years old.

He was among the young Spanish intellectuals deeply affected by their country's humiliating defeat in the Spanish–American War of 1898, along with José Martínez Ruiz ("Azorín"), Pío Baroja and others forming the literary Generation of '98. His first collection of essays was published in 1898 under the name Hacia otra España ("Towards a Different Spain").

An early advocate of socialism, he became disillusioned by the Great War while he was serving as the London correspondent for several Spanish newspapers and travelled in France and Germany.

== Move to right ==
After returning to Spain, Maeztu rejected many of his friends and argued that human reason alone was not enough to solve social problems, and he argued for the importance of strong authority and tradition rooted in the Roman Catholic Church. Those ideas were embodied in his 1916 book, Authority, Liberty, and Function in the Light of the War, first published in English and later in Spanish as La Crisis del Humanismo (1919).

Maeztu became one of the most prominent defenders of the regime of Miguel Primo de Rivera and called for Spain to "recover its 16th-century sense of Roman Catholic mission". In 1926, his literary essays were published in Don Quijote, Don Juan y La Celestina, and in 1928, he served as Spanish ambassador to Argentina.

In 1930, he joined the National Monarchist Union, the successor party to Primo de Rivera's Patriotic Union, along other defenders of the dictatorship such as the son of the dictator, José Antonio, and the former ministers José Calvo Sotelo and Eduardo Callejo de la Cuesta.

Along with Pedro Sainz Rodríguez and others, Maeztu founded the monarchist political movement Acción Española in 1931. In 1934, his final published book was written, Defensa de la hispanidad ("In Defense of Spanishness"), which advocated "a return to pure Spanishness" and strongly condemned liberalism and the French Revolution's slogan "liberty, equality, fraternity", which he countered by his own motto, duty, hierarchy, and humanity. He thought of Spanishness as a spiritual world that united Spain and its former colonies by the Spanish language and Catholicism, with rationalism and democracy being supposedly alien to the Hispanic ethos.

Since 1932, in articles for Acción Española, La Nación and the ABC newspaper, he expressed admiration for Adolf Hitler, also showing himself to be a supporter of the anti-Semitism of the Nazi Party. Also from the pages of ABC, he came to express his desire that a nationalist movement similar to Hitler's would triumph in Spain to confront democracy and Marxism, asking the extremist José María Albiñana to lead the project. Nonetheless, Maeztu believed that race was "made up of speech and faith" and did not see racial admixture as a problem.

== Death and legacy ==
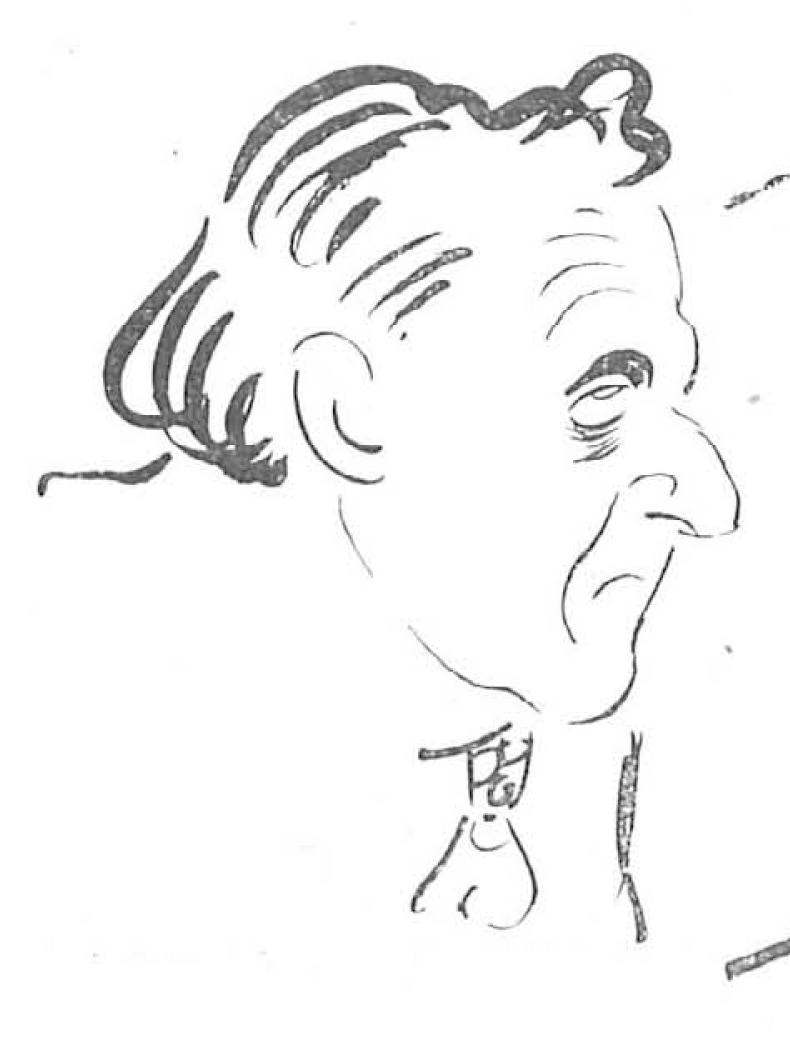
1920 caricature of Maeztu

On 29 October 1936, Maeztu was executed by Republican soldiers in the early days of the Spanish Civil War near Madrid. These last words are attributed to him: "You do not know why you kill me, but I know why I'm dying: for your children to be better than you!" His political thoughts had a profound influence on the Chilean historian Jaime Eyzaguirre.

His younger sister was the Spanish educator and feminist, María de Maeztu, who founded the Residencia de Señoritas and the Lyceum Club in Madrid, and his younger brother was the painter Gustavo de Maeztu, who has a museum named after him in the Palace of the Kings of Navarre in Estella, Spain.

The Spanish philosopher José Ortega y Gasset dedicated his book Meditations on Quixote (1914) to Maeztu — "A Ramiro de Maeztu, con un gesto fraternal."

== Works ==
- (1899). Hacia otra España
- (1911). La Revolución y los Intelectuales
- (1916). Inglaterra en Armas
- (1919). La Crisis del Humanismo
- (1920). Del Espíritu de los Vascos
- (1926). Don Quijote, Don Juan y La Celestina
- (1934). Defensa de la Hispanidad
- (1935). La Brevedad de la Vida en la Poesía Lírica Española
- Álvarez Chillida, Gonzalo (2002). El Antisemitismo en España. La imagen del judío (1812-2002). Madrid: Marcial Pons. ISBN 978-84-95379-49-8.

Works in English translation

- "Expressionism," The New Age, Vol. XIV, No. 4, 1913, pp. 122–123.
- "England and Germany: Two Types of Culture," The New Age, Vol. XVI, No. 12, 1915, pp. 303–304.
- "On Belgian Nationality," The New Age, Vol. XVI, No. 14, 1915, pp. 372–374.
- "On Marx and Wealth and Power," The New Age, Vol. XVI, No. 16, 1915, pp. 423–424.
- "What is a Nation?," The New Age, Vol. XVI, No. 16, 1915, p. 436.
- "The Bellicose Pacifists," The New Age, Vol. XVI, No. 18, 1915, pp. 481–482.
- "Bureaucracy and War," The New Age, Vol. XVI, No. 20, 1915, pp. 530–532.
- "Death and Resurrection," The New Age, Vol. XVI, No. 22, 1915, pp. 583–584.
- "On Art and Luxury," The New Age, Vol. XVI, No. 24, 1915, pp. 640–642.
- "The Jealousy of the Guilds," The New Age, Vol. XVI, No. 26, 1915, pp. 687–688.
- "On Luxury and Waste," The New Age, Vol. XVII, No. 2, 1915, pp. 34–35.
- "War and Solidarity," The New Age, Vol. XVII, No. 4, 1915, pp. 81–83.
- "On Novels and Happiness," The New Age, Vol. XVII, No. 6, 1915, pp. 129–131.
- "The Natural Defence of Luxury," The New Age, Vol. XVII, No. 6, 1915, pp. 141–142.
- "On Compulsion," The New Age, Vol. XVII, No. 8, 1915, pp. 179–181.
- "Art and Utility," The New Age, Vol. XVII, No. 9, 1915, p. 215.
- "Not Happiness, But...," The New Age, Vol. XVII, No. 10, 1915, pp. 224–226.
- "On Liberty of Thought," The New Age, Vol. XVII, No. 12, 1915, pp. 273–274.
- "Happiness and Beauty," The New Age, Vol. XVII, No. 12, 1915, pp. 294–295.
- "On Love and Veracity," The New Age, Vol. XVII, No. 14, 1915, pp. 330–332.
- "On Liberty and Organization," The New Age, Vol. XVII, No. 16, 1915, pp. 377–378.
- "The Historical Function of England," The New Age, Vol. XVII, No. 17, 1915, p. 411.
- "Beyond the Barriers of Liberty and Authority," The New Age, Vol. XVII, No. 17, 1915, pp. 424–425.
- "The Historical Function of England," The New Age, Vol. XVII, No. 19, 1915, p. 460.
- "On Law and the Guilds," The New Age, Vol. XVII, No. 20, 1915, pp. 472–473.
- "The End of Romanticism," The New Age, Vol. XVII, No. 22, 1915, pp. 521–522.
- "The Historical Function of England," The New Age, Vol. XVII, No. 23, 1915, p. 558.
- "On a Doctrine of Power," The New Age, Vol. XVII, No. 24, 1915, pp. 565–567.
- "On the Primacy of Things," The New Age, Vol. XVII, No. 26, 1915, pp. 617–619.
- "On the Balance of Power," The New Age, Vol. XVIII, No. 2, 1915, pp. 31–32.
- "On the Legal Principles of the Human Commonwealth," The New Age, Vol. XVIII, No. 4, 1915, pp. 78–80.
- "On the Economic Interpretation of History," The New Age, Vol. XVIII, No. 6, 1915, pp. 128–130.
- "On Right and Might," The New Age, Vol. XVIII, No. 8, 1915, pp. 178–180.
- "On Right and Might II," The New Age, Vol. XVIII, No. 10, 1916, pp. 224–226.
- "The German Heresy: The Man of the Renaissance," The New Age, Vol. XVIII, No. 12, 1916, pp. 273–275.
- "The German Heresy: The State as Necessity," The New Age, Vol. XVIII, No. 14, 1916, pp. 320–322.
- "The German Heresy: The State as the Good," The New Age, Vol. XVIII, No. 16, 1916, pp. 368–369.
- "The German Heresy: Hegel and the State," The New Age, Vol. XVIII, No. 18, 1916, pp. 417–418.
- "Disconnected Connections," The New Age, Vol. XVIII, No. 20, 1916, pp. 466–468.
- "On the Primacy of Things," The New Age, Vol. XVIII, No. 22, 1916, pp. 514–516.
- "More Disconnected Connections," The New Age, Vol. XVIII, No. 24, 1916, pp. 561–562.
- "The Primacy of Things," The New Age, Vol. XVIII, No. 24, 1916, p. 574.
- "A Reflection upon Sin," The New Age, Vol. XIX, No. 1, 1916, pp. 9–10.
- "The Primacy of Things," The New Age, Vol. XIX, No. 1, 1916, p. 22.
- "The Object of the War," The New Age, Vol. XIX, No. 2, 1916, p. 46.
- "On Functions and Values," The New Age, Vol. XIX, No. 3, 1916, pp. 57–58.
- "Authority, Liberty and Function," The New Age, Vol. XIX, No. 5, 1916, pp. 104–105.
- "The Confusions of Mr. Bernard Shaw," The New Age, Vol. XIX, No. 7, 1916, pp. 152–154.
- "The So-Called Law of Rent," The New Age, Vol. XIX, No. 7, 1916, pp. 198–199.
- "Mr. Shaw and the German Republic," The New Age, Vol. XIX, No. 13, 1916, pp. 294–297.
- "Independence & Interdependence," The New Age, Vol. XIX, No. 15, 1916, p. 344.
- "A Visit to the Front: Train and Steamer," The New Age, Vol. XIX, No. 21, 1916, pp. 486–487.
- "A Visit to the Front: The Sanitary Service," The New Age, Vol. XIX, No. 22, 1916, pp. 510–511.
- "A Visit to the Front: The Joy of War," The New Age, Vol. XIX, No. 23, 1916, pp. 533–534.
- "A Visit to the Front: The New British Tactics," The New Age, Vol. XIX, No. 24, 1916, pp. 557–559.
- "A Visit to the Front: A Military Base," The New Age, Vol. XIX, No. 25, 1916, pp. 580–581.
- "A Visit to the Front: On the North of the Somme," The New Age, Vol. XIX, No. 26, 1916, pp. 604–605.
- "A Visit to the Front: The English in France," The New Age, Vol. XX, No. 1, 1916, pp. 5–7.
- "A Visit to the Front: Salisbury Camp," The New Age, Vol. XX, No. 2, 1916, p. 29.
- "A Visit to the Front: The Production of Munitions," The New Age, Vol. XX, No. 3, 1916, pp. 53–54.
- "A Visit to the Front: Final Impression," The New Age, Vol. XX, No. 4, 1916, pp. 77–78.
- "On Power and Things," The New Age, Vol. XX, No. 7, 1916, pp. 158–159.
- Authority, Liberty, and Function in the Light of the War, London: George Allen & Unwin, 1916.
- "Partnership and Fellowship," The New Age, Vol. XX, No. 12, 1916, pp. 272–274.
- "On Love and Things," The New Age, Vol. XX, No. 15, 1917, p. 358.
- "The Principle of Nationality," The New Age, Vol. XX, No. 16, 1917, p. 366-367.
- "The Value of Nationality," The New Age, Vol. XX, No. 17, 1917, pp. 395–396.
- "The Wonders of Desolation," The New Age, Vol. XXI, No. 6, 1917, pp. 128–130.
- "The Value of 'Function'," The New Age, Vol. XXI, No. 6, 1917, p. 143.
- "Liberty and Pleasure," The New Age, Vol. XXI, No. 10, 1917, pp. 223–225.
- "Liberty and Morality," The New Age, Vol. XXI, No. 12, 1917, pp. 262–264.
- "The Fetish of Personality," The New Age, Vol. XXI, No. 14, 1917, pp. 301–303.
- "Personal v. Political Liberty," The New Age, Vol. XXI, No. 16, 1917, p. 344.
- "Personal v. Political Liberty II," The New Age, Vol. XXI, No. 17, 1917, pp. 363–364.
- "The Principle of Growth," The New Age, Vol. XXI, No. 19, 1917, pp. 402–404.
- "To Begin With," The New Age, Vol. XXI, No. 23, 1917, pp. 483–484.
- "The Functional Principle," The New Age, Vol. XXI, No. 25, 1917, pp. 526–527.
- "The Nature of Societies," The New Age, Vol. XXI, No. 26, 1917, pp. 542–543.
- "Function in Land," The New Age, Vol. XXII, No. 2, 1917, pp. 26–28.
- "Liberty and Democracy," The New Age, Vol. XXII, No. 6, 1917, pp. 107–109.
- "Old Worlds for New," The New Age, Vol. XXII, No. 6, 1917, pp. 132–133.
- "Tolstoy's Revolution," The New Age, Vol. XXII, No. 10, 1917, pp. 186–187.
- "The Formula of the War," The New Age, Vol. XXII, No. 14, 1917, pp. 266–267.
- "'Necessity' in Law," Inter-America, Vol. I, No. 1, 1917, pp. 31–34.
- "The Best of Both Worlds," The New Age, Vol. XXII, No. 16, 1918, pp. 306–307.
- "Land Power or Sea Power?," The New Age, Vol. XXII, No. 17, 1918, pp. 323–324.
- "Fate and Resignation," The New Age, Vol. XXII, No. 19, 1918, pp. 371–372.
- "The Russian Lesson for Industrial Democracy," The New Age, Vol. XXII, No. 22, 1918, p. 431.
- "Dostoyevsky the Manichean," The New Age, Vol. XXII, No. 23, 1918, pp. 449–451.
- "Let Us Be Whole!," The New Age, Vol. XXII, No. 26, 1918, p. 497.
- "Function and Rights," The New Age, Vol. XXIII, No. 22, pp. 347–348.
- "Germany Now," The New Age, Vol. XXIV, No. 10, 1919, pp. 155–157.
- "East and West," The New Age, Vol. XXVII, No. 14, 1920, p. 212.
- "On Earth as in Heaven," The New Age, Vol. XXVII, No. 21, 1920, pp. 308–309.
- "The War Diary of a Square Peg," The New Age, Vol. XXVII, No. 26, 1920, pp. 369–370.
- "The International Policy of Spain," Foreign Affairs, Vol. I, No. 2, 1922, pp. 136–143.
- "Automobiles and National Character," The Living Age, Vol. CCCXXII, No. 4185, 1924.
- "A Spaniard's Exposition of Spengler," The Living Age, Vol. CCCXXVII, No. 4241, 1925.
- "How to Make the Yankee Harmless," The Living Age, Vol. CCCXXVIII, No. 4264, 1926.
