= Carlos Faraudo =

Spanish Army officer (1901–1936)

- Born: Carlos Faraudo y de Micheo; 19 April 1901; Madrid, Spain
- Died: May 9, 1936 (aged 35); Madrid
- Military career
- Allegiance: Spanish Republic
- Branch: Military Engineering Corps, Spanish Republican Army
- Service years: 13
- Rank: Captain

Carlos Faraudo, full name Carlos Faraudo y de Micheo —sometimes wrongly spelled as "de Miches", (19 April 1901 in Madrid – 9 May 1936 in Madrid), was a Spanish Army officer.

His assassination was one of the high-profile murders that brought about the reprisal killing of firebrand rightist politician José Calvo Sotelo as part of the orchestrated destabilization of the Spanish Republic right before the Spanish Civil War.

== Biography ==
Carlos Faraudo was born in an affluent family of the Spanish capital. In August 1923, after successfully finishing his studies at the Academy of Military Engineering of Guadalajara, he became a lieutenant and was sent to Melilla. In November 1925 he was posted in Madrid. By October 1929 he was promoted to the rank of captain. In 1931 Faraudo became a member of the Spanish Socialist Workers' Party (PSOE).

Between 1932 and 1933 Faraudo was sent to Bolivia as an instructor for the Bolivian Army, returning to Spain following the outbreak of the Chaco War. At Dehesa de la Villa he became close to socialist leader Francisco Largo Caballero. Faraudo then was involved in training the militias of the Socialist Youth of Spain (Juventudes Socialistas). Later he became a member of the leftist Unión Militar Republicana Antifascista (UMRA) clandestine military organization.

Faraudo was severely wounded on 8 May 1936 in the evening after being attacked in the street by Falangists while he was strolling with his wife. His name had appeared at the top of a list allegedly prepared by the pro-fascist-leaning Unión Militar Española (UME), another secret military organization opposed to UMRA. Although he was immediately brought to a clinic, he died of his wounds the following morning. His burial was attended by numerous mourners and made the headlines of the press in the troubled Spanish Republic.

== See also ==
- José Castillo (police officer)
