= Palace of Antonio de Mendoza =

- Palacio de Antonio de Mendoza (Spanish)
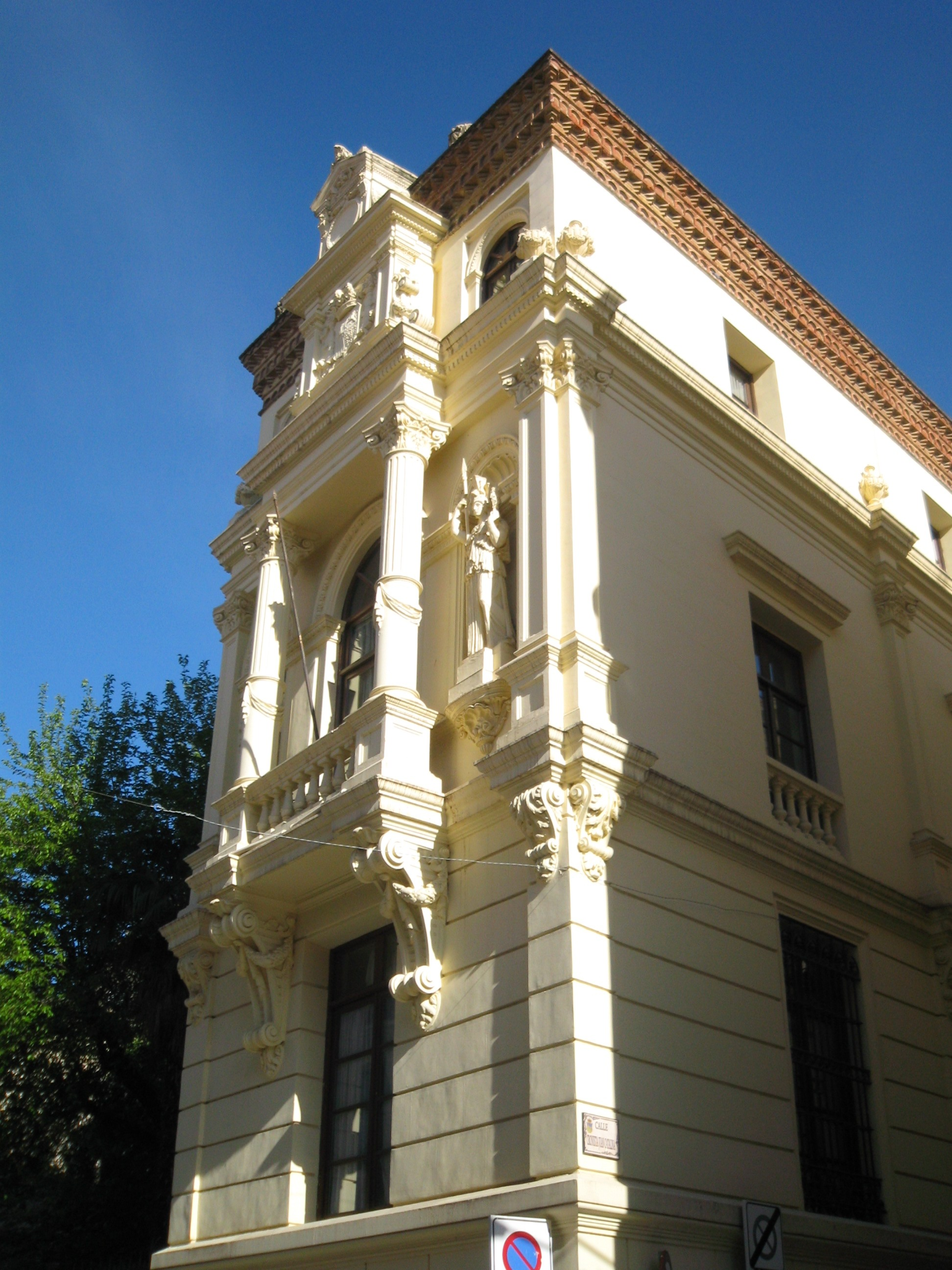

- Location within Spain
- 40.634822°N 3.166734°W
- Location: Guadalajara, Spain

Spanish Cultural Heritage
- Official name: Palacio de Antonio de Mendoza
- Type: Non-movable
- Criteria: Monument
- Designated: 1931
- Reference no.: RI-51-0000607

The Palace of Antonio de Mendoza (Spanish: Palacio de Antonio de Mendoza) is a palace located in Guadalajara, Spain. It was declared Bien de Interés Cultural in 1931.
