= Foundation of San Diego de Alcalá-Fundación de la Vega del Pozo =

- Fundación de San Diego de Alcalá-Fundación de la Vega del Pozo (Spanish)
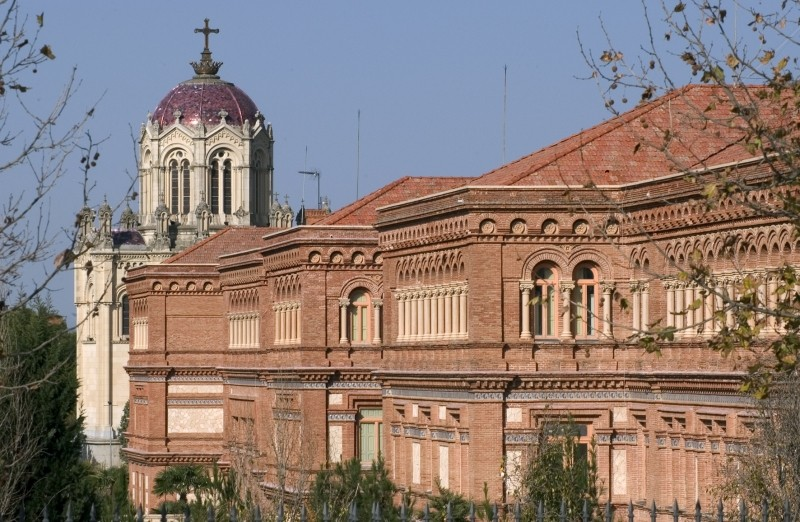

- Location within Spain
- 40.627778°N 3.154167°W
- Location: Guadalajara, Spain

Spanish Cultural Heritage
- Official name: Fundación de San Diego de Alcalá-Fundación de la Vega del Pozo
- Type: Non-movable
- Criteria: Monument
- Designated: 1993
- Reference no.: RI-51-0008278

The Foundation of San Diego de Alcalá-Fundación de la Vega del Pozo (Spanish: Fundación de San Diego de Alcalá-Fundación de la Vega del Pozo) is a foundation located in Guadalajara, Spain. It was declared Bien de Interés Cultural in 1993.
