= Spanish Renovation =

Political party

Spanish Renovation Renovación Española
- Leader: Antonio Goicoechea; José Calvo Sotelo
- Founded: De facto: 16 January 1933; De jure: February 1933
- Dissolved: 8 March 1937
- Split from: Popular Action
- Merged into: FET y de las JONS
- Headquarters: Madrid, Spain
- Ideology: Alfonsism; Authoritarian conservatism Traditionalism; Integrism
- Political position: Far-right

Party flag

Spanish Renovation (Spanish: Renovación Española, RE) was a Spanish monarchist political party active during the Second Spanish Republic that advocated the restoration of Alfonso XIII of Spain, as opposed to Carlism. Associated with the Acción Española think-tank, the party was led by Antonio Goicoechea and José Calvo Sotelo. In 1937, during the course of the Spanish Civil War, it formally disappeared after Francisco Franco's merger of the variety of right-winged organizations in the nationalist zone into a single party (FET-De las JONS).

== History ==
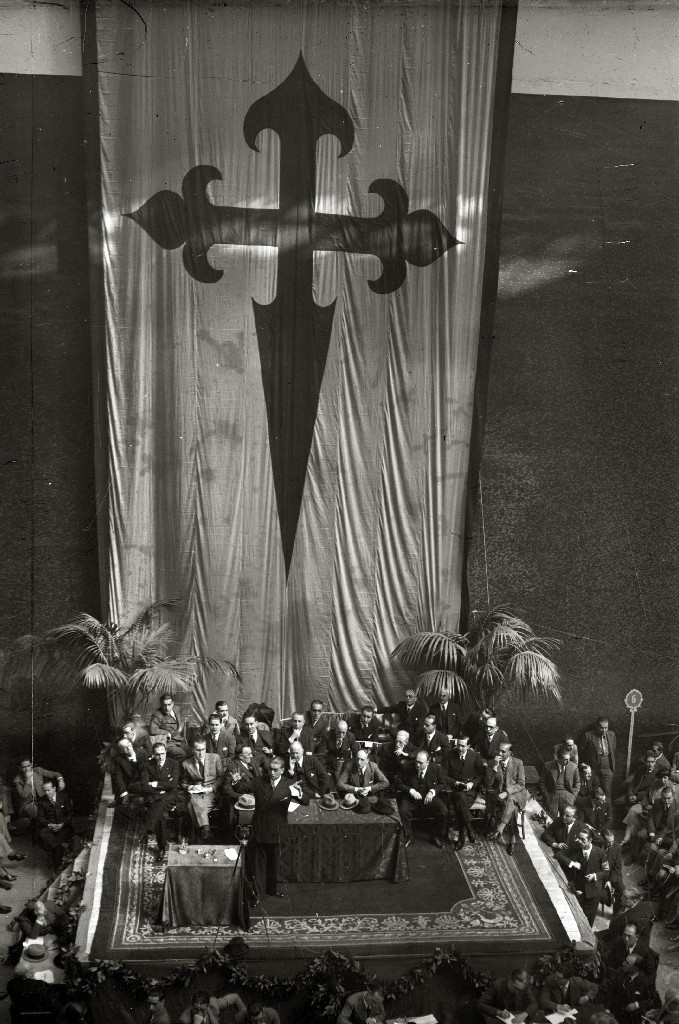
Calvo Sotelo delivering a speech in 1935

The group was formed in January 1933 after Goicoechea and some followers split from Acción Popular and were given Alfonso's approval to form a new party, although from the outset RE maintained good relations with the Carlists and sought to bring them into various anti-Republican conspiracies. Even before the Civil War RE was linked to the Falange, paying it a 10,000 peseta monthly subsidy. RE espoused a kind of authoritarian statist corporatism, particularly marked after Calvo Sotelo took control of the party.

The group was one of the first amongst those involved in conspiracy against the Popular Front government to endorse Franco as overall leader. RE was also closely linked to the military group Unión Militar Española which played an important role in bringing about civil war. During the opening stages of the civil war RE was close to General Emilio Mola, who consulted regularly with the group's leadership.

The assassination of Calvo Sotelo, who was much more personally popular and a better orator than the generally ineffectual Goicoechea, in July 1936 had weakened RE somewhat and before long they became wholly subservient to Franco in an attempt to retain influence for a group that had little popular support. Along with a variety of other far right groups RE disappeared in April 1937 with the formation of the Falange Española Tradicionalista y de las Juntas de Ofensiva Nacional-Sindicalista. Recognising that his power base was flimsy at best Goicoechea immediately accepted the decree and dissolved RE.

Political parties and organizations in the Spanish Civil War
The Popular Front (Republican)	Supporters of the Popular Front (Republican)	Nationalists (Francoist)
The Popular Front was an electoral alliance formed between various left-wing and centrist parties for elections to the Cortes in 1936, in which the alliance won a majority of seats.: UR (Unión Republicana - Republican Union): Led by Diego Martínez Barrio, formed in 1934 by members of the PRR, who had resigned in objection to Alejandro Lerroux's coalition with the CEDA. It drew its main support from skilled workers and progressive businessmen.; IR (Izquierda Republicana - Republican Left): Led by former Prime Minister Manuel Azaña after his Republican Action party merged with Santiago Casares Quiroga's Galician independence party and the Radical Socialist Republican Party (PRRS). It drew its support from skilled workers, small businessmen, and civil servants. Azaña led the Popular Front and became president of Spain. The IR formed the bulk of the first government after the Popular Front victory with members of the UR and the ERC.; ERC (Esquerra Republicana de Catalunya - Republican Left of Catalonia): Created from the merging of the separatist Estat Català (Catalan State) and the Catalan Republican Party in 1931. It controlled the autonomous government of Catalonia during the republican period. Throughout the war it was led by Lluís Companys, also president of the Generalitat of Catalonia.; PSOE (Partido Socialista Obrero Español - Spanish Socialist Workers' Party): Formed in 1879, its alliance with Acción Republicana in municipal elections in 1931 saw a landslide victory that led to the King's abdication and the creation of the Second Republic. The two parties won the subsequent general election, but the PSOE left the coalition in 1933. At the time of the Civil War, the PSOE was split between a right wing under Indalecio Prieto and Juan Negrín, and a left wing under Largo Caballero. Following the Popular Front victory, it was the second largest party in the Cortes, after the CEDA. It supported the ministries of Azaña and Quiroga, but did not actively participate until the Civil War began. It had majority support amongst urban manual workers.; UGT (Unión General de Trabajadores - General Union of Workers): The socialist trade union. The UGT was formally linked to the PSOE, and the bulk of the union followed Caballero.; Federacion de Juventudes Socialistas (Federation of Socialist Youth); PSUC (Partit Socialista Unificat de Catalunya - Unified Socialist Party of Catalonia): An alliance of various socialist parties in Catalonia, formed in the summer of 1936, controlled by the PCE.; JSU (Juventudes Socialistas Unificadas - Unified Socialist Youth): Militant youth group formed by the merger of the Socialist and the Communist youth groups. Its leader, Santiago Carrillo, came from the Socialist Youth, but had secretly joined the Communist Youth prior to merger, and the group was soon dominated by the PCE.; PCE (Partido Comunista de España - Communist Party of Spain): Led by José Díaz in the Civil War, it had been a minor party during the early years of the Republic, but grew in importance during the war.; POUM (Partido Obrero de Unificación Marxista - Worker's Party of Marxist Unification): An anti-Stalinist revolutionary communist party of former Trotskyists formed in 1935 by Andreu Nin.; JCI (Juventud Comunista Ibérica - Iberian Communist Youth): the POUM's youth movement.; PS (Partido Sindicalista - Syndicalist Party): a moderate splinter group of CNT.	Unión Militar Republicana Antifascista (Republican Anti-fascist Military Union): Formed by military officers in opposition to the Unión Militar Española.; Anarchist groups. The anarchists boycotted the 1936 Cortes election and initially opposed the Popular Front government, but joined during the Civil War when Largo Caballero became Prime Minister.; CNT (Confederación Nacional del Trabajo - National Confederation of Labour): The confederation of anarcho-syndicalist trade unions.; Milicias confederales (Confederal militias) - The militia movement of the CNT, composed of a number of columns.; FAI (Federación Anarquista Ibérica - Iberian Anarchist Federation): The federation of anarchist groups, very active in the Republican militias.; Mujeres Libres (Free Women): The anarchist feminist organisation.; FIJL (Federación Ibérica de Juventudes Libertarias - Iberian Federation of Libertarian Youth); Catalan nationalists.; Estat Català (Catalan State): Catalan separatist party created back in 1922. Founding part of ERC in 1931, it sided with the Republican faction during the war.; Basque nationalists.; PNV (Partido Nacionalista Vasco - Basque Nationalist Party): A Catholic Christian Democrat party under José Antonio Aguirre, which campaigned for greater autonomy or independence for the Basque region. Held seats in the Cortes and supported the Popular Front government before and during the Civil War. Put its religious disagreement with the Popular Front aside for a promised Basque autonomy.; ANV (Acción Nacionalista Vasca - Basque Nationalist Action): A leftist Socialist party, which at the same time campaigned for independence of the Basque region.; STV (Solidaridad de Trabajadores Vascos - Basque Workers' Solidarity): A trade union in the Basque region, with a Catholic clerical tradition combined with moderate socialist tendencies.; SRI (Socorro Rojo Internacional - International Red Aid): Communist organization allied with the Comintern that provided considerable aid to Republican civilians and soldiers.; International Brigades: pro-Republican military units made up of anti-fascist Socialist, Communist and anarchist volunteers from different countries.	Virtually all Nationalist groups had very strong Roman Catholic convictions and supported the native Spanish clergy.: Unión Militar Española (Spanish Military Union) - a conservative political organisation of officers in the armed forces, including outspoken critics of the Republic like Francisco Franco. Formed in 1934, the UME secretly courted fascist Italy from its inception. Already conspiring against the Republic in January 1936, after the electoral victory of the Popular Front in February it plotted a coup with monarchist and fascist groups in Spain. In the run-up to the Civil War, it was led by Emilio Mola and José Sanjurjo, and latterly Franco.; Alfonsist Monarchist - supported the restoration of Alfonso XIII. Many army officers, aristocrats, and landowners were Alfonsine, but there was little popular support.; Renovación Española (Spanish Restoration) - the main Alfonsine political party.; Acción Española (Spanish Action) - an integral nationalist party led by José Calvo Sotelo, formed in 1933 around a journal of the same name edited by political theorist and journalist Ramiro de Maeztu.; Bloque Nacional (National Block) - the militia movement founded by Calvo Sotelo.; Carlist Monarchist - supported Prince Alfonso Carlos, Duke of Anjou and San Jaime's claim to the Spanish throne and saw the Alfonsine line as having been weakened by Liberalism. After Alfonso Carlos died without issue, the Carlists split - some supporting Carlos' appointed regent, Francisco-Xavier de Borbón-Parma, others supporting Alfonso XIII or the Falange. The Carlists were clerical hard-liners led by the aristocracy, with a populist base amongst the farmers and rural workers of Navarre providing the militia.; Comunión Tradicionalista (Traditionalist Communion) - the Carlist political party; Requetés (Volunteers) - militia movement.; Pelayos - militant youth movement, named after Pelayo of Asturias.; Margaritas - women's movement, named after Margarita de Borbón-Parma, wife of Carlist pretender Charles VII (1868-1909).; Falange (Phalanx): FE (Falange Española de las JONS) - created by a merger in 1934 of two fascist organisations, Primo de Rivera's Falange (Phalanx), founded in 1933, and Ramiro Ledesma's Juntas de Ofensiva Nacional-Sindicalista (Assemblies of National-Syndicalist Offensive), founded in 1931. It became a mass movement when it was joined by members of Acción Popular and by Acción Católica, led by Ramón Serrano Súñer.; OJE (Organización Juvenil Española) - militant youth movement.; Sección Femenina (Feminine Section) - women's movement in labour of Social Aid.; Falange Española Tradicionalista y de las JONS - created by a merger in 1937 of the FE and the Carlist party, bringing the remaining political and militia components of the Nationalist side under Franco's ultimate authority.; CEDA - coalition party founded by José María Gil-Robles y Quiñones whose ideology ranged from Christian democracy to conservative. Although they supported Franco's rebellion, the party was dissolved in 1937, after most members and militants joined FE and Gil-Robles went to exile.; Juventudes de Acción Popular, also known as the JAP. The fascistised youth wing of the CEDA. In 1936 they suffered a drain of militants, who joined the Falange.
