= Pedro Sainz Rodríguez =

Spanish politician

The Most Excellent Pedro Sainz Rodríguez
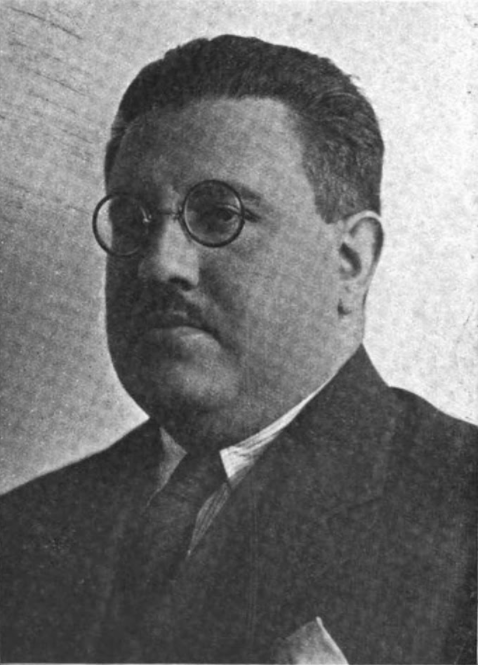
- Born: 14 January 1897; Madrid, Spain
- Died: 14 December 1986 (aged 89); Madrid, Spain

Seat c of the Real Academia Española
- In office 10 June 1979 – 14 December 1986
- Preceded by: Amalio Gimeno
- Succeeded by: Manuel Fernández-Galiano (Note: Fernández-Galiano was elected for the position in 1987 but never took the seat)

Pedro Sainz Rodríguez (14 January 1897 in Madrid – 14 December 1986) was a Spanish writer, philologist, publisher and politician, an adviser to Infante Juan, Count of Barcelona and one of the main architects of the reign of Juan Carlos I of Spain and the Spanish transition to democracy. Within the wide coalition of right-wing opinion that was the early movement behind Francisco Franco he was the leading figure of the monarchist wing. In terms of character Sainz Rodríguez was noted for his quick wit, whilst physically he was known for his obesity.

== Academic career ==
Sainz Rodríguez first came to prominence as a philology academic and a disciple of Marcelino Menéndez y Pelayo. He became noted as an expert in 'Golden Age' mysticism and a defender of traditional Catholicism. He argued that Spain had become decadent because of an invasion of liberalism into the ruling classes from the 18th Century onwards and called for a return to the ideals of Catholicism and the heroic spirit of Don Quixote. His 1925 work, La evolución de las ideas sobre la decadencia española y otros estudios de crítica literaria, became one of the most widely read books on the theme of the decline of Spain, a popular theme for rightist authors at the time.

== Alliance with Franco ==
As a friend of Franco he was instrumental in convincing him to join in the coup attempt of José Sanjurjo, Emilio Mola and other right-wing generals that led to the Spanish Civil War. A close associate of Mola, he shared his ally's belief that Franco's tenure at the head of the nationalists would be a short one designed only to take advantage of Franco's personal popularity.

Despite his personal reservations about his leadership, Sainz Rodríguez was appointed Minister of Education in 1938 as part of Franco's first cabinet. During his time in office Sainz Rodríguez ensured that Spanish education would once again be dominated by the Church. As a cabinet Minister he took the lead in attacking the Constitutional proposals put forward by the Falangist hard-line of Manuel Hedilla, Dionisio Ridruejo, Agustín Aznar and Fernando González Vélez which sought to build Spain into a party state along the lines of Fascist Italy and Nazi Germany. Sainz Rodríguez was supported in his opposition by Franco and both Aznar and González Vélez were imprisoned for their part in the proposal. Unsurprisingly Sainz Rodríguez became a target of abuse from the Falangists and, damaged by the criticism, he requested his own removal from office in April 1939. Despite this he did not last long in his position, being replaced in 1939 by José Ibáñez Martín.

== Monarchism ==
Sainz Rodríguez drifted from the government and in 1943 was involved in a plot with Generals Antonio Aranda and Luis Orgaz Yoldi, who intended to restore the monarchy with a coup. Ultimately, however, nothing came of that initiative. However, he remained committed to monarchism and, along with Spanish Confederation of the Autonomous Right leader José María Gil-Robles y Quiñones and the author Eugenio Vegas Latapié, he was one of the three main consellors of Juan. During the Second World War, he was also a regular contact of Samuel Hoare, whose role was to keep Spain from joining the Axis powers.

Increasingly distant from Franco, he was even accused by el caudillo of organising international criticism of Spain in a Masonic plot with Santiago Montero Díaz, a dissident from the Falange wing although Sainz Rodríguez had no link. Despite the lack of evidence, Franco would keep repeating his allegations of Freemasonry against Sainz Rodríguez. Indeed, when the staunch Falangist Mauricio Carlavilla produced the book Anti-España 1959, which criticised the monarchist cause as a tool of Freemasonry, Franco indicated to Juan that he shared many of its views because of the prominence of Sainz Rodríguez in monarchism. Juan, however, rejected Franco's opinions and retained Sainz Rodríguez as a close advisor.

== Later years ==
Sainz Rodríguez became noted as a prolific writer on the history of spirituality in Spain, producing such works as Historica de la literatura mística en España (1984) and the four volume Antología de la literatura espiritual español (1980–1985). His autobiography came out after Franco's death and reflected the deterioration between Franco and himself. Indeed, in keeping with the memoirs of many of his contemporaries, it largely dismissed El Caudillo as a bland and mediocre individual.

== Bibliography ==
- Preston, Paul (1995). Franco: a biography. London: Fontana. ISBN 9780006862109. OCLC 33101891.
