= Republican Antifascist Military Union =

Anti-fascist organization during the Second Spanish Republic

The Republican Antifascist Military Union (Spanish: Unión Militar Republicana Antifascista; UMRA) was a self-described anti-fascist organization for members of the Spanish Republican Armed Forces in Spain during the period of the Second Spanish Republic.

By 1935, the Spanish Military Union, a secret military organization of pro-fascist officers of the Spanish Republican Armed Forces had extended its influence among Spanish officers and began displaying open hostility towards the Spanish Republic. In order to oppose and neutralize this movement, Eugenio Rodríguez Sierra, an officer of the Spanish Republican Navy was instrumental in the foundation of the Antifascist Military Union. The Unión Militar Antifascista was later merged with the Republican Military Union, another group of similar goals that had been founded in 1929 within the Army, in order to create the Republican Antifascist Military Union.

One of the members of UMRA, Captain Carlos Faraudo, would be blacklisted by Spanish Military Union. He had allegedly been placed at the top of the list before being murdered. Membership of this secret society was especially high among the Assault Guard. One of its leading members, Captain Díaz Tendero, was later to perish at the Mauthausen–Gusen concentration camp.

== Bibliography ==
- Beevor, A. (2006). The Battle for Spain. London: Penguin. ISBN 9780143037651.
- Busquets, J. (2003). Ruido de sables (in Spanish). Barcelona: Crítica. ISBN 9788484324249.
- Franco Castañón, H. (2004). Por el camino de la revolución (in Spanish). Valladolid: Neptuno. ISBN 9788496016309.
- Suero Roco, T. (1981). Militares republicanos de la Guerra de España (in Spanish). Barcelona: Península Ibérica. ISBN 9788429717068.
