= 20th International Battalion =

20th International Battalion 20.º Batallón Internacional
- Active: March 1937 – January 1938
- Country: Various (see text)
- Allegiance: Spain
- Branch: International Brigades
- Type: Battalion – Infantry
- Role: Home Defence
- Part of: XV International Brigade; 86th Mixed Brigade
- Garrison/HQ: Albacete
- Engagements: Spanish Civil War

Commanders
- Notable commanders: Aldo Morandi

The 20th International Battalion (Spanish: 20.º Batallón Internacional —Vigésimo Batallón Internacional or "Batallón 20" — Batallón Veinte) was a battalion of the International Brigades during the Spanish Civil War.

== History ==
The high number of casualties suffered by the XV International Brigade during the month of February 1937 prompted the General Staff of the Spanish Republican Army to create the 20th Battalion at the time of the Fascist Italian attack in Guadalajara in March.

The 20th Battalion was formed by remnants of the 21st Battalion garrisoned at Pozo Rubio, Albacete, new volunteers, as well as some soldiers and officers who had recovered from their wounds. It was made up of three companies of fusiliers, a Polish/Czechoslovak Company, a French Company, an Anglo-American Company—which had an American, a Latin-American, and an Irish and British section, as well as a mixed machine-gun company of Germans and Austrians. It was moved to Puertollano—at the edge of the Sierra Morena—and put under the orders of the Chief of the Army of Andalusia on 20 March. Later the 20th Battalion would be joined by two battalions, one of militias and a Carabineros battalion.

Eventually the 20th Battalion became the nucleus around which the 86th Mixed Brigade would be established around the first half of April 1937. In January 1938, as a result of heavy restructuring, the 20th International Battalion was split into three battalions, the 20th, 21st and 22nd.
