= 222nd Regiment =

222nd Regiment may refer to:

- 222nd Aviation Regiment, United States
- 222nd Infantry Regiment, United States

== See also ==
- 222nd Brigade (disambiguation)
