= 222nd Division =

222nd Division may refer to:

- 222nd Coastal Division, Italy
- 222nd Division (Imperial Japanese Army)
- 222nd Rifle Division, Soviet Union

== See also ==
- List of military divisions by number
- 222nd Brigade (disambiguation)
- 222nd Regiment (disambiguation)
