= Breakup of Spanish armed forces (1936) =

Fractionalization of Spanish military

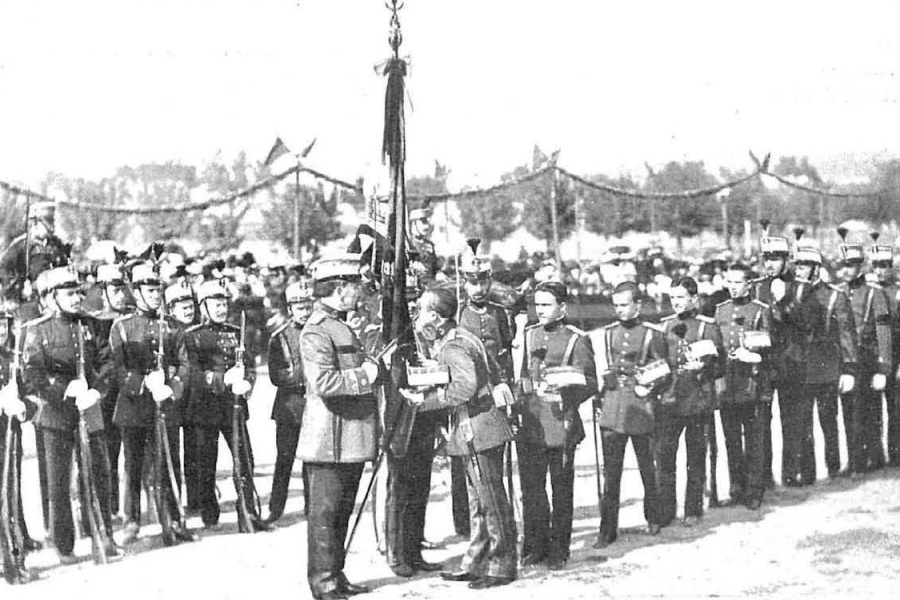
Cadets take the oath to serve Spain, 1915. 20 years later most of them, usually in senior officer ranks, will have to decide what this means

The breakup of Spanish armed forces of July 1936 was the process of decomposition of the Second Spanish Republic's military and public order formations into two factions: the one which supported the government (loyalists, later called Republicans) and the one which joined the coup (rebels, later called Nationalists). Theoretically there were some 250,000 men serving in various armed branches. However, in fact this figure was probably much closer to 170,000, of which 90,000 served in the military and 80,000 in public order formations; detailed figures advanced by historians differ.

In historiography the prevailing opinion is that more armed servicemen joined the rebels than the loyalists; the ratio advanced differs from 62:38 to 52:48, yet there are also scholars who claim that only the minority joined the insurgency. It is usually accepted that slightly more peninsular troops and slightly more public order men remained loyal rather than rebelled, but that the so-called Army of Africa, which in its entirety joined the coup, tilted the balance in favor of the Nationalists.

Numerical split of manpower between the two warring sides of the Spanish Civil War is by no means indicative as to division of military and combat potential. This is mostly because in the Republican zone the effectives theoretically available were not taken advantage of; many military units were dissolved as potentially rebellious, many officers were detained, many units with few officers and NCOs left turned into loose undisciplined groupings, many rank-and-file servicemen opted for a wait-and-see stance and many later crossed to the Nationalist zone. Also, in early days following the failed coup the military potential of both sides was to a significant extent defined by civilian volunteers.

== Military ==
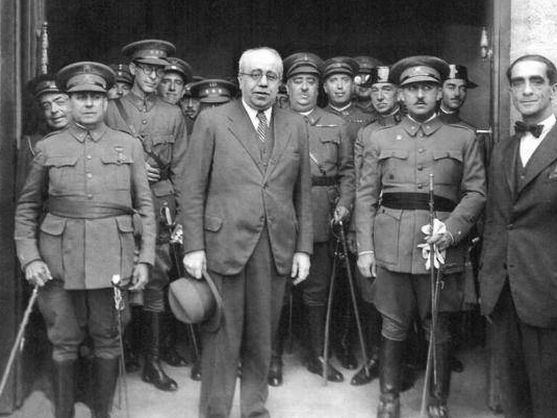
Azaña and military commanders

The Spanish military forces were falling into 3 major groups: 1) mainland army, stationed in garrisons in peninsular Spain and on the islands; in numerical terms it was composed mostly of conscripts. Most scholars do not hold these troops in high regard, suggesting poor quality of training, low morale, outdated equipment and officers who often have never seen combat, resembling bureaucrats in uniforms rather than military commanders. These troops were organised into 8 so-called organic divisions, each corresponding to one military region; their theoretical strength is usually quoted as 110,000-120,000, but in July 1936 there were no more than 70,000 actually in the barracks; 2) army stationed in Africa. It consisted of heterogeneous formations, but mostly of indigenous Moroccan troops and the Foreign Legion, both composed of volunteers. Most of its officers and NCOs saw combat during Rif Wars. African troops were widely considered the best part of the Spanish army; they numbered some 24,500 men in actual service; 3) the navy. In terms of manpower there were some 12,000 people serving in its ranks; the fleet was composed of rather obsolete larger warships and numerous newer destroyers, with some modern cruisers near completion in shipyards. Peninsular and African troops were governed by the Ministry of War; the fleet was governed by the Ministry of Marine. Air force, which technically formed a separate branch, in terms of manpower grouped no more than few thousand men.

=== Peninsular army ===
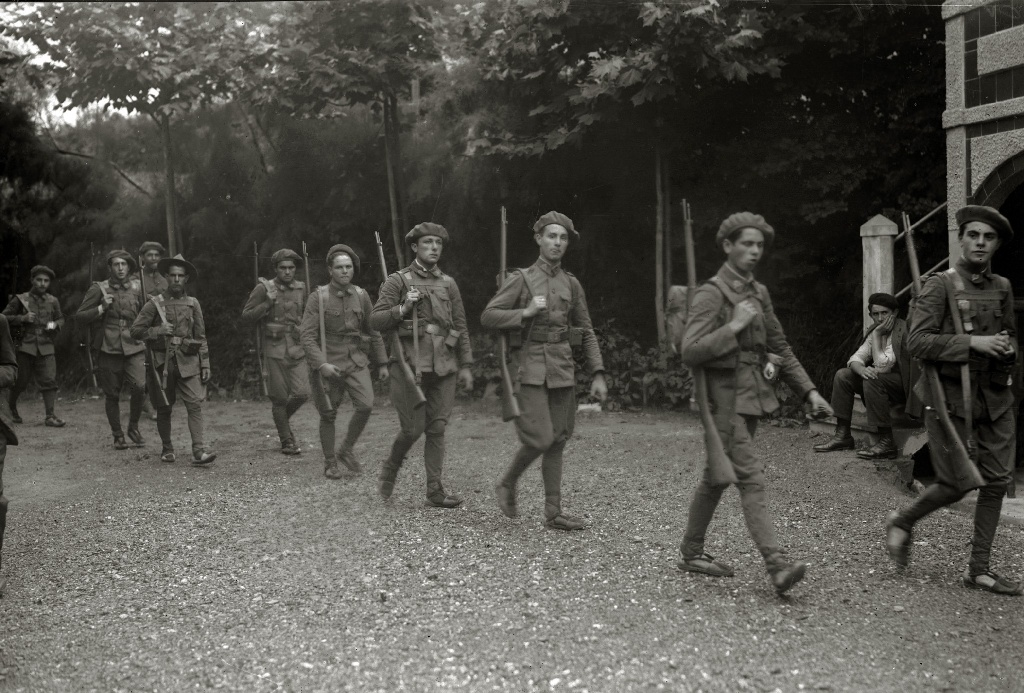
Conscripts, Gipuzkoa

Beevor claims that there were some 110,000 military on the continent and islands in total; Alía Miranda opts for 115,000, while Quesada and Clifford give the theoretical figure of 120,000. These figures stand no comparison to calculations of military historians, who claim that de facto there were some 65,000 troops in all peninsular garrisons; retrospective analysis of the Francoist staff claimed 60,000. Fairly recent analysis of the Republican army during the civil war, written by Alpert, claims that the total number of troops actually in the barracks in July 1936 was some 65,000. The record high figure of some 80,000 is suggested by Hooton and Clifford, while the record low figure is advanced by Puell de la Villa, who gives the total of 45,000. How this mass was split between the Republicans and the Nationalists is unclear, e.g. at times totals advanced by various authors do not match their own sub-totals. Cierva claimed 32,000 Republicans and 19,000 Nationalists (63:37), Nationalist staff had 36,500 Republicans and 23,500 Nationalists (61:39), Quesada claims 33,000 Republicans and 24,000 Nationalists (58:42) and exactly the same figures are given by Turnbull, Beevor settles for 57,000 Republicans and 50,000 Nationalists (53:47), Romero Salvado opts for 35,000 Republicans and 32,000 Nationalists (52:48) and almost exactly the same figures are advanced by Alpert, 34,000 Republicans and 32,000 Nationalists (52:48), repeated also by Thomas and Platón. The same proportion of 52:48, but much lower totals are advanced (with detailed figures broken down into divisions and branches) by Arzanegui: 27,000 Republicans vs. 25,000 Nationalists. Hooton comes out with 40,000 Republicans and 38,000 Nationalists (51:49) and same ratio, though different totals (46,000 Republicans, 44,000 Nationalists) are recommended by Ranzato, while Payne maintains that “less than half” of “fewer than 90,000” rebelled (47,000 Republicans, 38,000 Nationalists?). Some scholars, who accept the figure of 66,000 troops actually in the barracks on the peninsula, settle for general remark that they were “spread roughly equally”. Puell is the only scholar who claims that most peninsular troops joined the rebels: 21,600 Republicans vs. 23,600 Nationalists (48:52). In structural terms, out of 8 divisional commands 3 were controlled by the Republicans (I: Madrid, III: Valencia, IV: Barcelona) and 5 by the Nationalists (II: Sevilla, V: Zaragoza, VI: Burgos, VII: Valladolid, VIII: La Coruña). Out of 71 peninsular garrisons which hosted at least a battalion, the coup triumphed in 37 locations; 34 remained loyal.

=== African army ===
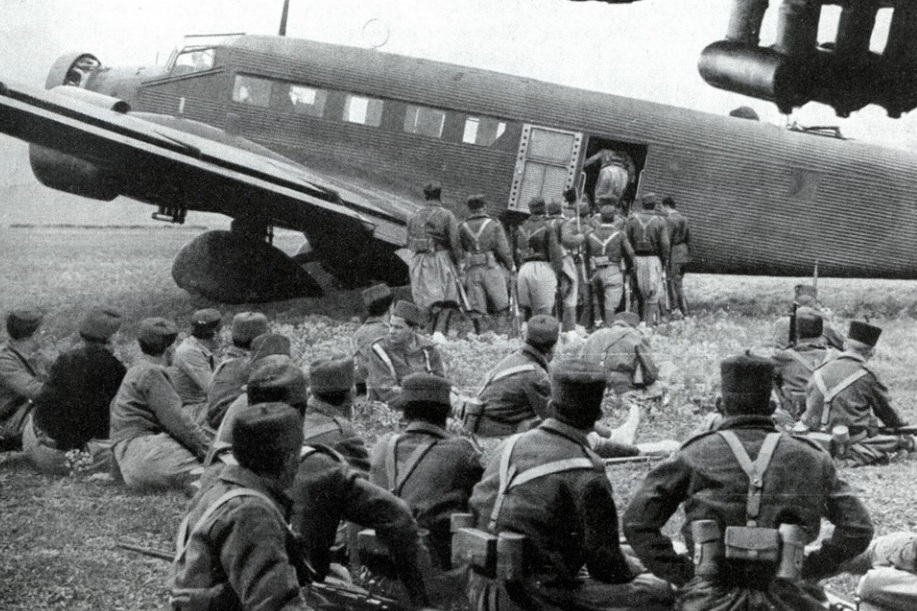
Regulares during the July Coup

Some earlier works, e.g. Salas, claimed that the Army of Africa consisted of some 47,000 troops; also some recent books advance similar figures, e.g. Beevor and Casanova refer to 40,000; Hooton claims 36,000 while Puell and Thomas give the number as 30,000. However, there was no homogeneous formation known as “Army of Africa” and Spanish Morocco was garrisoned by at least 4 different formations: 1) Foreign Legion, 2) indigenous troops in Spanish service, so-called Regulares, both infantry and cavalry, 3) indigenous troops in service of the sultan and 4) Carabineros, plus 5) minor figures related to navy, air force and policing formations. Already some older studies claimed that there were merely 24.5 thousand troops available to the Nationalists in Morocco, and the figure of 24,741 is advanced also by the recent military analysis. The difference, apart from usual issues related to leaves and outdated documentation, is due to some categories, especially troops in sultan's service, formally not having been under Spanish command and not having been available for shift towards the peninsula. All sources agree, however, that troops brought to Spain from Morocco were the best units in the army, battle-hardened during the Rif Wars, well-equipped and with high combative spirit. Almost all of these 25 thousand men joined the Nationalists, with the exception of some 300 men on leave on the peninsula.

=== Navy ===
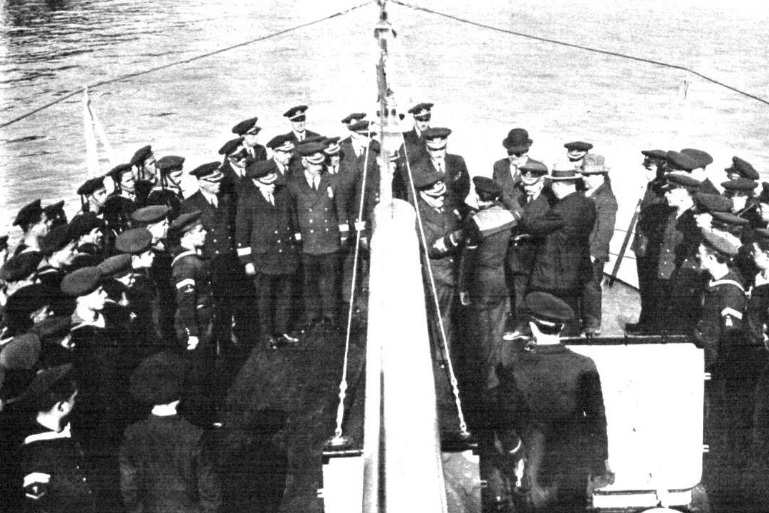
Spanish navy crew (1931)

Though in terms of land forces the potential of Spanish army was rather limited and in numerical terms it was smaller e.g. than the armies of Poland, Romania or Czechoslovakia, its navy still ranked as a powerful force to be reckoned with. In Europe it ranked far behind the British and French fleets, but until the early 1930s it was still comparable to the Soviet navy (Europe), German Reichsmarine/Kriegsmarine and the Italian Regia Marina, outclassed only when the latter three embarked on massive investment program. Salas estimated total naval personnel at 20,000, yet contemporary military historians reduce this figure to some 12,000 men. Quesada claims that 7,000 joined the rebels (with no info either on total or how many remained loyal), and Thomas gives the explicit split of 7,000 rebels vs. 13,000 loyalists. This, however, is of limited importance; what mattered was the split of warships available. In terms of tonnage, the Republican fleet was double the size of the Nationalist one (some 60,000 tons vs. some 30,000 tons), which was mostly thanks to Nationalist control over 1 battleship (16,000 tons). In terms of the number of warships the Republican advantage was massive: they operated 1 battleship, 3 light cruisers, 14 destroyers and 12 submarines, while the Nationalists operated 1 battleship, 1 light cruiser, 1 destroyer and no submarine. The Republicans controlled all ports along the Bay of Biscay and on the Mediterranean (some 80% of all coastline), while the Nationalists controlled ports in Galicia and on the Atlantic coast of Andalusia.

=== Total military ===
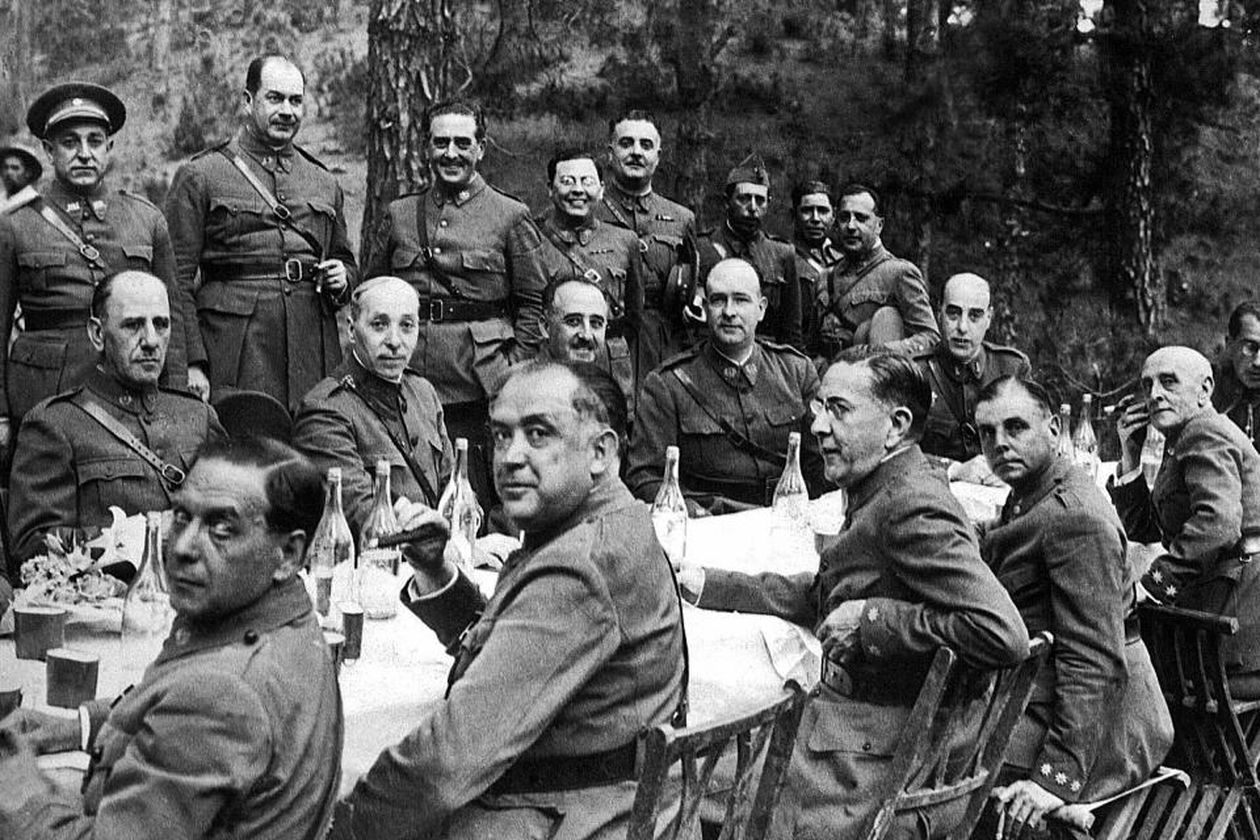
Officers on manoeuvres (1936)

Almost no author provides overall military figures (peninsula + Africa + navy) and in most cases, their suggestions must be ascertained by means of adding sub-totals or applying partial ratio calculations. For Puell it is 21,600 Republicans vs. 53,600 Nationalists (29:71), for Ranzato it is 46,000 Republicans vs. 89,000 Nationalists (34:66), for Romero Salvado it is 35,000 Republicans vs. 66,000 Nationalists (35:65), for Beevor it is 57,000 Republicans vs. 100,000 Nationalists (36:64), for Hooton it is 39,800 Republicans vs. 74,000 Nationalists (36:64), for Quesada it is 33,000 Republicans vs. 53,000 Nationalists (38:62), for Turnbull it is 33,000 Republicans vs. 48,000 Nationalists (41:59) and for Thomas 50,000 Republicans vs. 71,000 Nationalists (also 41:59). The narrative by Payne implicitly suggests the same ratio: 47,000 Republicans vs. 68,000 Nationalists (41:59).

The officer corps got split fairly evenly; recent military estimates suggest that out of 17,000 officers in total (inc. retired etc.), 8,000 found themselves in the Republican zone and 9,000 in the Nationalist one (47:53). However, in fact only 4,000 supported the loyalists and 13,000 opted for the rebels. Another author claims that out of officers active and in service, 2,000 opted for the Republicans and more than 4,600 for the Nationalists. One more scholar claims that for all officers in active command, 3,000 supported the Republicans and 5,900 sided with the Nationalists. For NCOs the numbers were 7,500 in the Republican zone and 8,000 in the Nationalist one.

== Public order forces ==
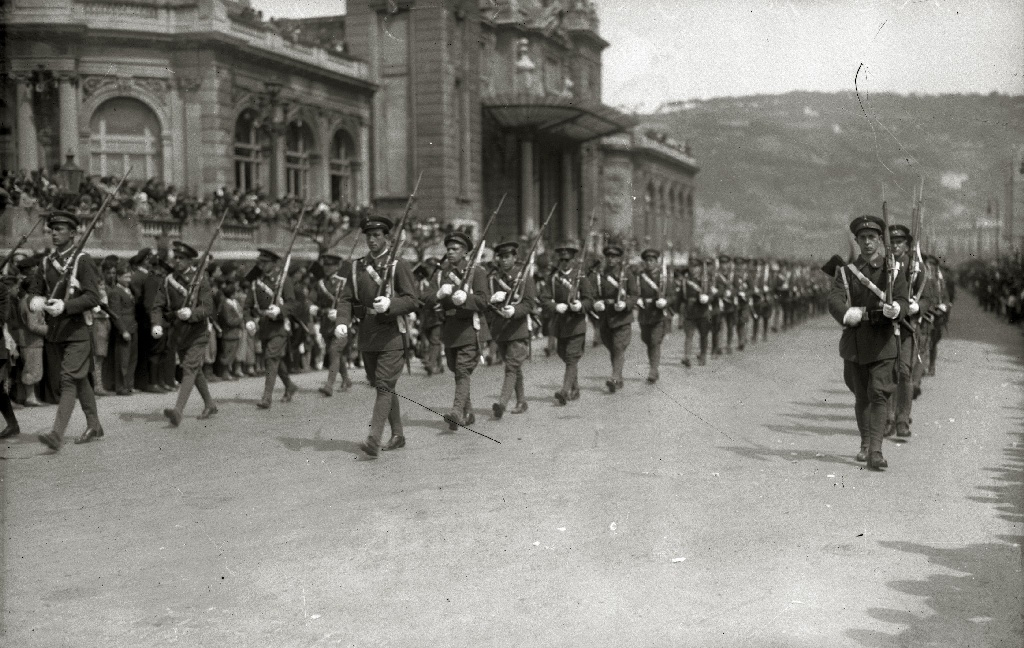
Miqueletes on parade, 1934

Apart from regular military, there were 3 other major uniformed and armed formations. None of them was formatted as combat troops, intended to take part in tactical warfare operations. However, they consisted of disciplined men in structured, barracks-based units, trained to perform policing role and to use firearms. The traditional constabulary, operational mostly in rural areas, was Guardia Civil (some 34,000 men). Another traditional service was Carabineros (formally Instituto de Carabineros), operating mostly along the frontiers to prevent smuggling (sources provide figures ranging from 14,000 to 16,000). Relatively new service was Guardia de Asalto (formally Cuerpo de Seguridad y Asalto), set up by the Republic (some 18,000). The Civiles and the Asaltos were subordinated to the Ministry of Interior; the Carabineros formed part of the Ministry of Finance structures. There was no service named “police”. However, there were some specialized armed services, e.g. traffic rules were enforced by Cuerpo de Vigilantes de Caminos. There were also various armed policing services subordinated to local authorities, be it regional or province-specific. Strength of these other units is highly unclear, though they might have amounted to 14,000. Total number of servicemen in all security formations was about 80,000.

=== Guardia Civil ===
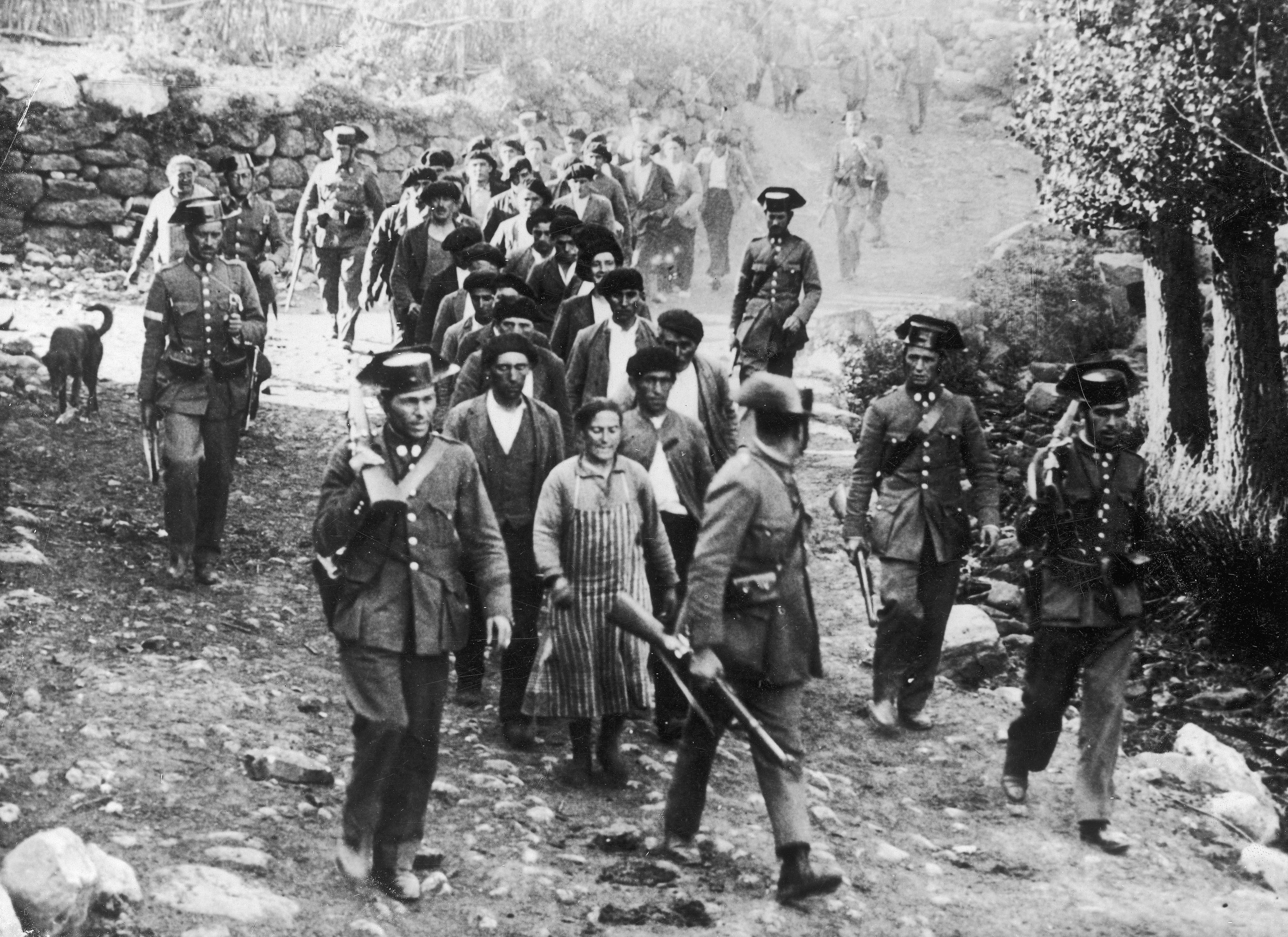
Civiles in action (1934)

By far the largest security formation in Spain was Guardia Civil; in sources its strength is quoted as 32,458, 32,477, 32,860, or 34,320. Its units were scattered evenly across all of the country, though with higher saturation in rural areas and small towns rather than in large urban centres. Its commander, general Sebastián Pozas Perea, was a loyal though not particularly vocal republican. The Civiles had a long-standing reputation of heavy-handed service, and were despised by left-wing supporters as an instrument of reactionary politics. Some sources claim that most of the servicemen joined the rebels; Beevor maintains that merely 40% (which would translate to 13,000-14,000 men) remained loyal. However, academic scholars tend to disagree; according to Tusell some 51% sided with the government, the popular Osprey series by Quesada suggested rather 53%, Thomas claims 56% while earlier Osprey work by Turnbull suggested 59%; this is the ratio advanced also by Osprey booklet by Lannon, by the Nationalist staff quoted by Payne (20,100) and by Platón (20,120). Depending upon the ratio estimated and overall strength assumed, in absolute terms these percentages would translate to some 16,000-20,000 Civiles in the Republican ranks and 13,000-16,000 in the Nationalist ones. There is abundant evidence of Guardia Civil taking part in combat during the July coup, either on the rebel or on the loyalist side. There seems to be no particular pattern emerging, and even in one area local garrisons might have adopted a different stand, e.g. in the Seville province some rebelled (in Ecija), some suppressed the rebellion (in Carmona) and some assumed a wait-and-see position (in Osuna). Out of 5 generals, who commanded 5 GC zones, only 1 rebelled.

=== Guardia de Asalto ===
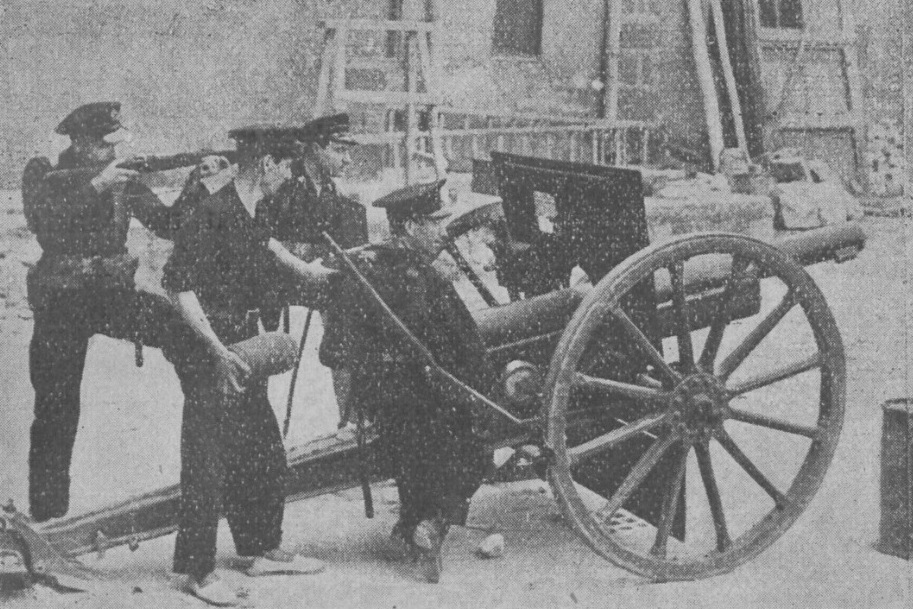
Asaltos during the July Coup

Sources tend to agree that the Asaltos numbered some 17.5 thousand servicemen (with detailed figure of 17,660 quoted). Since the formation was set up during the early Republic days – at the time it numbered some 4,000 men – it was intended not only as urban police, but also as sort of republican guard, which translated into specific recruitment and vetting procedures. It was partially formatted as riot police, supposed to deal also with urban unrest; the Asaltos were trained to operate artillery pieces and they were even equipped with armoured vehicles. They were deployed mostly in major urban centres; 6,000 (34% of the total) served in Madrid and Barcelona. The commander of the Asaltos was teniente coronel Pedro Sanchez Plaza, a zealous Republican. All authors agree that Guardia de Asalto remained mostly loyal to the government, either because of republican preferences of its servicemen, or because in large cities the rebels remained hesitant, which prompted these vacillating to side with the prevailing party. Tusell, Thomas, Lannon, Platón, Payne and other sources agree that some 70% of the Asaltos sided with the loyalists, which in absolute figures would translate to some 12,000 in Republican ranks and some 5,000 in the Nationalist ones. Also Quesada claims 12,000 for the Republicans. Beevor claims that as much as 40% sided with the rebels, which would rather suggest the figures of 11,000 for the Republicans and 7,000 for the Nationalists.

=== Carabineros ===
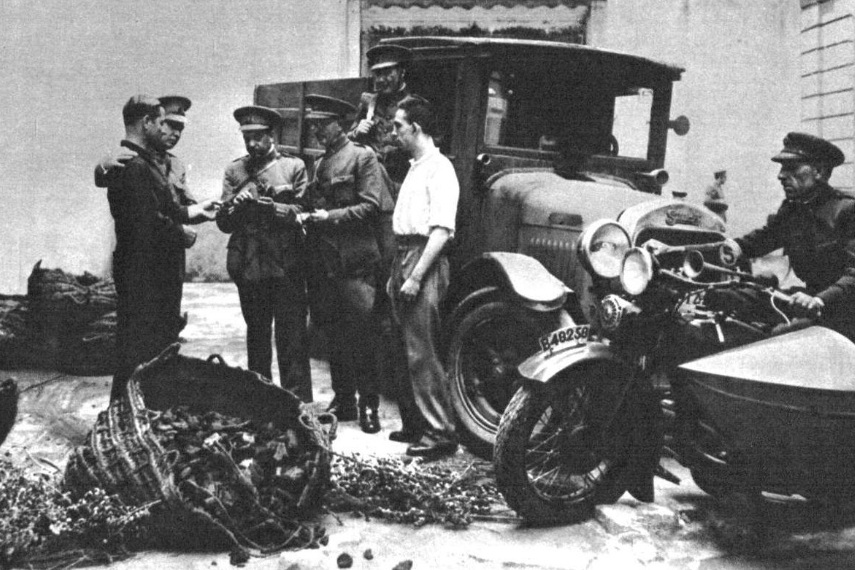
Carabineros in action (1935)

In literature there is some discrepancy as to the number of Carabineros: some authors claim 14,113 and others claim 16,096. Like in case of Guardia de Asalto, their geographical distribution was highly uneven, this time conditioned not by urbanisation, but by location of Spanish frontiers; they were deployed mostly along the coastline, in northern provinces along the Pyrenean border with France and in western provinces along the border with Portugal. The general inspector of the formation was Gonzalo Queipo de Llano, one of chief military conspirators and later rebel leaders, yet there is no evidence he developed a plot structured in ranks of the service. It rather seems that their choices were conditioned by circumstances; in regions where rebels prevailed (Navarre, Leon) they sided with the Nationalists, in regions with loyalist domination (Catalonia, Extremadura) they supported the government. Payne, Turnbull and Tusell agree that in overall terms most of the Carabineros remained in Republican ranks, though they give the percentage as 65% (some 10,000 men, the figure also explicitly advanced by Quesada), 60% (some 9,000 men) or 59% (also 9,000), which leaves some 4,000-5,000 for the Nationalists. Entirely different split is suggested by Beevor, who maintains that “about two-thirds” opted for rebellion (hence, some 5,000 for the Republicans and some 10,000 for the Nationalists). Even larger rebel advantage is assumed by Thomas: 4,000 Republicans and 10,000 Nationalists.

=== Other armed policing services ===
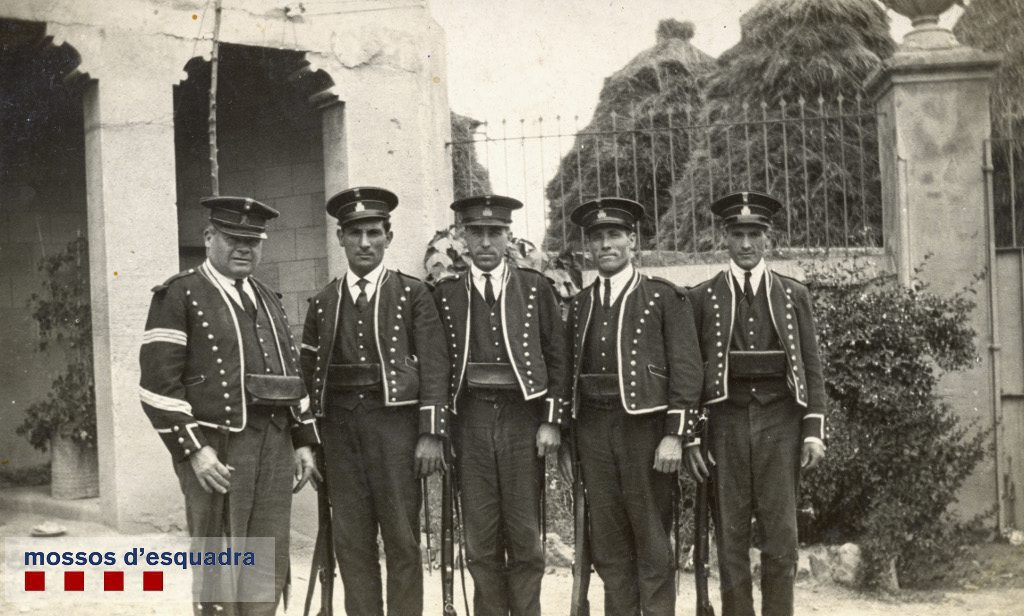
Mossos d'Esquadra (1930)

Almost all historiographic works ignore minor, local and specialized armed services, and almost none provides any approximation as to their numerical strength. However, when in 1937 the Nationalist general staff estimated composition of both sides back in July 1936, they included the position of “Guardia de Asalto y policía armada”, with the total of 31,200 men. As the number of the Asaltos was 17.6 thousand, this leaves some 13,600 to all other minor specialized formations, like Cuerpo de Vigilantes de Caminos, forest rangers, or prison guards; this figure covers also local policing services, be it regional (Mossos d’Esquadra in Catalonia), provincial (Miqueletes in Gipuzkoa or Miñones in Alava) or municipal (in many cities municipal guards carried firearms). It is not clear how many of them sided with the loyalists and how many joined the rebels. If the Nationalist estimates are considered as point of departure and if the number of Asaltos is accepted as discussed earlier, it seems that some 10,000 remained loyal and some 4,000 opted for insurgency. There is little anecdotic evidence available to provide some examples, yet it is known that some of these servicemen initially took part in combat; e.g. Mossos d'Esquadra protected governmental buildings in Barcelona and Miqueletes engaged against advancing Carlist requetés in defence of their control posts at the border between Gipuzkoa and Navarre.

=== Total security formations ===
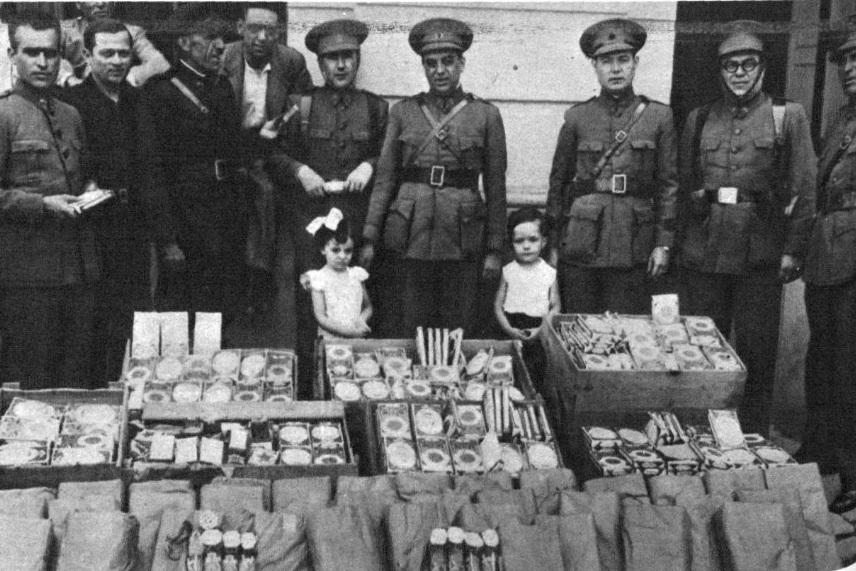
Carabineros with smuggled goods

All security formations in total are usually estimated to be between some 53,000 and 70,000 men, though these computations do not include local and specialized policing services; when included, the figure might be around 80,000. Totals for both warring factions, which emerge from aggregating specific estimates coming from various authors and related to particular services might differ widely, ranging between 29,000 and 52,000 for the Republicans and between 24,000 and 41,000 for the Nationalists. However, in few cases some authors provide their suggestions for all security services in total, not necessarily in line with their detailed estimates. Beevor claims there were 33,000 for the Republicans and 30,000 for the Nationalists; Payne suggests rather 37,000 vs. 30,000, Thomas points to 34,000 vs. 29,000, Hooton advances 37,000 vs. 23,000, Quesada maintains 40,000 vs. 30,000, García Rodríguez opts for 40,000 vs. 27,000, Turnbull 32,000 vs. 21,000, Ranzato 42,000 vs. 25,000, Lannon 51,000 vs. 29,000 and exactly the same figures were estimated by the Nationalist general staff in 1937. The overall percentage split of security forces which emerges from different sources is (Republicans vs. Nationalists): 64:36 (Lannon, also Nationalist staff 1937), 63:37 (Ranzato), 62:38 (Hooton), 61:39 (Turnbull), 60:40 (Tusell, García Rodríguez), 57:43 (Quesada), 55:45 (Payne), 54:46 (Puell, Thomas) and 52:48 (Beevor).

== Armed forces in total ==
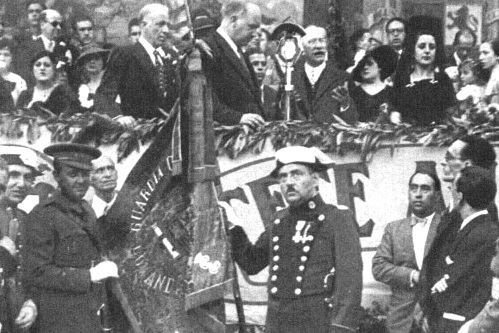
Army officer, Guardia Civil Commander and Prime minister during a local ceremony, 1935

In theory in July 1936 there were some 250,000 men in all Spanish armed forces, both the military and the security formations. On paper, i.e. counting theoretical staff figures related to specific garrisons, some 110,000 were in the Republican zone and 140,000 in the Nationalist one (44:56). Beevor maintains that proportionate advantage of the rebels was even larger and gives the totals of 90,000 in Republican zone and 130,000 in the Nationalist one (41:59). However, some synthetic works might claim the reverse proportion, e.g. according to Casanova out of 250,000 in total, 120,000 opted for the rebels (which implies that 130,000 remained loyal, 52:48). The discrepancy is of little importance, since 250,000 was a largely theoretical figure and the actual number of men under arms was much lower, mostly due to outdated staff documentation, recruitment in progress, and leaves in midst of the summer season.

Recent study of military historians claims that the figure of “los efectivos realmente operativos” was probably about 167,000, though earlier figures provided by some authors added up even to the record low total of 133,000. The Nationalist general staff estimated in 1937 that with the total of 165,000, the split was 88,000 for the loyalists and 77,000 for the rebels (53:47), which is the unique (along Casanova) statistics claiming the Republicans held numerical advantage. Most scholars, however, claim the Nationalist advantage. Puell (who calculated the total estimate for both sides of 140,000) comes with the largest one, namely 54,000 Republicans and 86,000 Nationalists (38:62). Esdaile (whose total is 159,000) is next with 68,000 Republicans and 91,000 Nationalists (43:57), Ranzato's take (44:56) is 202,000 in total, 88,000 Republicans and 114,000 Nationalists, Hooton claims that (out of 174,000) there were 77,000 Republicans and 97,000 Nationalists (44:56). Figures of Thomas (total 184,000) add up to 84,000 Republicans and 100,000 Nationalists (46:54). Various sub-totals calculated by Quesada point to the total of 158,000, and the split of 74,000 for the Republicans and 84,000 for the Nationalists (47:53). Payne also claims Nationalist numerical advantage; he opts for the total of 184,000 and for the split of 88,000 vs. 96,000 (48:52). In his later work he is somewhat more vague, but with the similar total of 182,000 and the similar – though implied, not explicitly stated – split of 84,000 Republicans and 98,000 Nationalists (46:54). The smallest overall difference in strength is suggested by Turnbull: 65,000 Republicans and 68,000 Nationalists (49:51).

In early months of the war the balance of forces was to a large extent defined also by civilian volunteers, usually coming from different militias. According to a recent work, until October 1936 there were 89,400 volunteers registered in Republican ranks, and until December 1936 there were 65,000 in Nationalist ones. These figures can not be put next to above estimates, which refer to mid-July 1936 and are largely theoretical, especially for the Republican zone, where many military units which did not rebel soon disintegrated. Also, since mid-July both sides launched their own conscription schemes.

== Tabular summary ==
The below table summarises all numerical estimates found in the sources consulted and discussed above. The numbers are in thousands. In most cases there are 2 figures in a cell; one is for the lowest figure identified, and one is for the highest figure identified. Given the discrepancies, it is hardly possible to suggest a "prevailing" figure for every category. Also, an attempt to produce an arithmetic "average" figure does not seem feasible, given one single extreme estimate might distort the calculation; e.g. five sources give the number of peninsular troops loyal to the government in the range of 32,000—36,000, but there is one which comes out with the figure of 57,000 and one which advances merely 21,600.

formation	total	Republicans	Nationalists
Peninsular army	45—105	22-57	19–50
African army	25—45	0	25–45
Navy	12-20	10—15	2–7
Guardia Civil	32—34	14—20	13–16
Guardia de Asalto	17-31	10—22	5–9
Carabineros	14-16	5—10	5–10
Other policing services	0—14	0—10	0–4
Total	133—250	54—110	68–140

== See also ==
- Army of Africa (Spain)
- Civil Guard (Spain)
- Security and Assault Corps
- Carabineros (Spain)
- Golpe de Estado de julio de 1936 en la Armada española
- Spanish coup of July 1936
