= 63rd Division (Spain) =

- 63.ª División
- Active: 1937–1939
- Country: Spain
- Allegiance: (Second Spanish Republic) Republican faction
- Branch: Spanish Republican Army
- Type: Infantry
- Size: Division
- Part of: VIII Army Corps
- Garrison/HQ: Villanueva de Córdoba
- Engagements: Spanish Civil War

The 63rd Division was one of the divisions of the People's Army of the Republic that were organized during the Spanish Civil War on the basis of the Mixed Brigades. Throughout the war it was deployed on the Cordoba front.

== History ==
The unit was created at the end of the summer of 1937. It was made up of the 25th, 86th, and 114th brigades, with their command post in Villanueva de Córdoba. Command of the division fell to Aldo Morandi, with Fritz Schiller as Chief of Staff. At the end of the year it was incorporated into the VIII Army Corps.

In February 1938, Morandi took command of the Extremadura Division, being replaced by José Frías González-Mouvelles. Except for a few sporadic actions, for most of the war the 63rd Division did not take part in significant military operations. In March 1939, after the Casado coup, Ildefonso Castro Ruiz assumed command of the unit. The unit was still on the Córdoba front when it found out about the end of the war.

== Command ==
Commanders

- Aldo Morandi;
- José Frías González-Mouvelles;
- Julián del Castillo;
- Ildefonso Castro Ruiz;

Commissars

- Kind Vera Jiménez, of the CNT;

Chiefs of Staff

- Fritz Schiller;
- Enrique Trigo Bru;

== Organization ==
Date	Attached Army Corps	Integrated Mixed Brigades	Battle front
December 1937	VIII Army Corps	25th, 86th, 114th	Córdoba
July 1938	VIII Army Corps	86th, 114th, 210th	Córdoba
August-Sept 1938	VIII Army Corps	61st, 86th, 114th	Córdoba

== Bibliography ==
- Álvarez, Santiago (1989). Los comisarios políticos en el Ejército Popular de la República (in Spanish). Ediciós do Castro.
- Engel, Carlos (1999). Historia de las Brigadas Mixtas del Ejército Popular de la República (in Spanish). Madrid, Almena. ISBN 84-922644-7-0.
- Martínez Bande, José Manuel (1975). La llegada al mar (in Spanish). Madrid: Editorial San Martín.
- Martínez Bande, José Manuel (1981). La batalla de Pozoblanco y el cierre de la bolsa de Mérida (in Spanish). Madrid: San Martín.
- Moreno Gómez, Francisco (1985). La Guerra civil en Córdoba (1936-1939) (in Spanish). Córdoba: Alpuerto.
