= 86th Mixed Brigade =

86th Mixed Brigade 86.ª Brigada Mixta
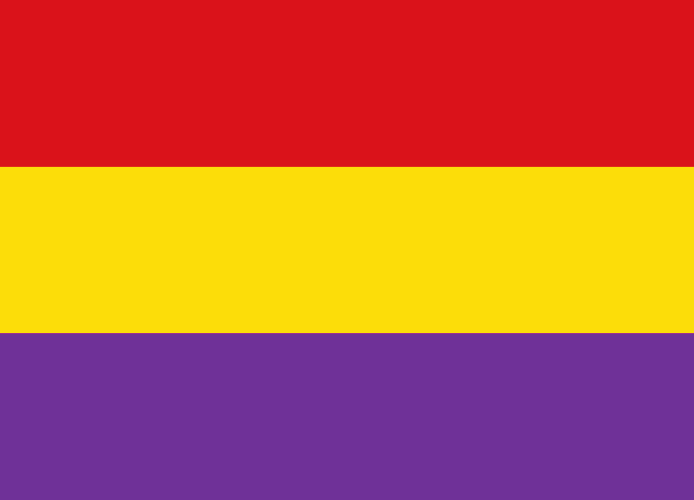
- Military flag of the Popular Army
- Active: 1937–1939
- Country: Spain
- Branch: Spanish Republican Army - Infantry; International Brigades (January - October 1938)
- Type: Mixed Brigade
- Role: Home Defence
- Size: Four battalions: The 341, 342, 343 and 344
- Part of: 24th Division (1937); 63rd Division (1937 - 1939)
- Garrison/HQ: Puertollano
- Engagements: Spanish Civil War

Commanders
- Notable commanders: Aldo Morandi

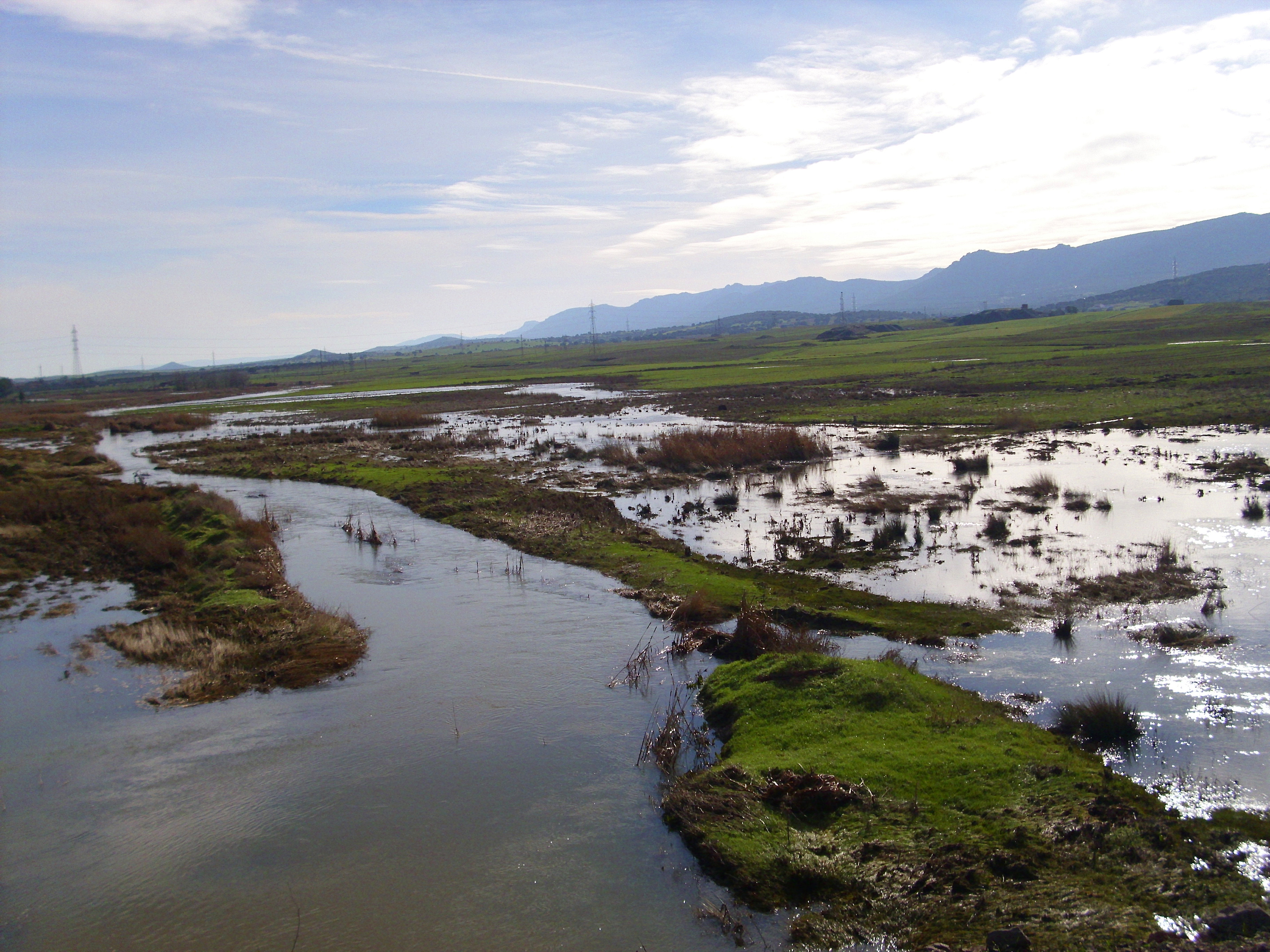
View of the Ojailén River and Sierra Madrona near Puertollano.

Flag of the International Brigades.

The 86th Mixed Brigade (Spanish: 86.ª Brigada Mixta), was a mixed brigade of the Spanish Republican Army in the Spanish Civil War. It was formed in March 1937 with battalions of the Carabineros corps. Until its demise it operated mostly in the Sierra Morena area, at the southern limits of the territory held by the Republic.

In January 1938 it was deeply restructured and transformed into an International Brigade having 2,338 international fighters which lasted until 1 October the same year.

== History ==
=== First phase ===
A unit known as Brigada Móvil de Puertollano was established towards the end of 1936 led by Infantry Lieutenant Colonel Ernesto Martín del Castillo. It was organized with two Carabineros battalions from Requena and Castellón, the 'Pablo Iglesias nr 2 Battalion' from Valencia and another Carabineros battalion that joined the unit in Linares.

In March 1937 this military unit became the 86th Mixed Brigade (86.ª Brigada Mixta) and one of its Carabineros battalions was replaced by the 20th International Battalion (20.º Batallón Internacional). The newly-formed battalion had four companies: the First (1ª compañía) was French; the Second (2ª compañía) or Anglo-American Company was English-speaking with a Latin-American, an American and a British and Irish section; the Third (3ª compañía) included Czechoslovak and Polish volunteers; and the Fourth (4ª compañía de ametralladoras) was made up of Germans and Austrians.

The leader of the new unit was Italian Militia Major Aldo Morandi, who was replaced as head of the 20th International Battalion by Mexican Colonel Juan Bautista Gómez, with German Major Fritz Schiller as Chief of Staff. The reorganized brigade became part of the 24th Division of the Spanish Republican Army.

On 10 March the brigade performed poorly in combats around Sierra Mulva. Between 27 March and 13 April it took part in military operations over Peñarroya-Pueblonuevo, attacking Pozoblanco in the left flank of the campaign. On 22 August the brigade was badly shattered at Puerto de San Vicente. Between 18 and 20 October it took part in the defense of the Sierra de la Noria. In December it was made part of the 63rd Division of the 8th Army Corps and again it suffered a lot of casualties during the attack against Granja de Torrehermosa, so that it was relieved of its duties and sent to Villanueva de Córdoba in order to be reorganized. At this time there were numerous desertions among the remaining members of the wrecked brigade.

=== International Brigade period ===
In January 1938, as a result of heavy restructuring, the 20th International Battalion was split into three battalions, the 20th, 21st and 22nd. At the same time three of the Carabineros battalions were transferred to the 222nd Mixed Brigade so that the only remaining Spanish battalion was the 'Pablo Iglesias nr 2 Battalion'. Thus the 86th Mixed Brigade became one more International Brigade, with 2,338 international fighters of which 57 were leaders and officers and 29 were sub-officers. The newly-formed battalions were led by Militia Majors Ernst Düdel, Paul Odpadlik, Cuni Bernhardt and Adolf Rach, while the machine gun company was led by Georg Prunzings.

The restructured brigade returned to the front line at the Sierra del Castaño and the Peña del Águila, replacing the 103rd Mixed Brigade. It saw action during the attack against the rebel positions at Villafranca de Córdoba covering the front in the Guadalmellato and Miradero positions. However, in order to satisfy the demands of the Non-Intervention Committee, the foreign members of the brigade were withdrawn on 1 October 1938 and were replaced by battalions of Spanish conscripts. Being composed of local soldiers, thenceforward the 86th Mixed Brigade was wrapped up as an International Brigade.

=== End of the unit ===
In its last phase the 86th Mixed Brigade was initially led by Militia Major Lino Carrasco Ortiz, who was replaced by Militia Major Ramón Lleida Gómez after only a month. The unit saw little action in the intervening months until the final defeat and surrender of the Spanish Republic in March 1939.

== See also ==
- Mixed Brigades
- Carabineros
