= Juliusz Hibner =

Polish brigader general and physicist

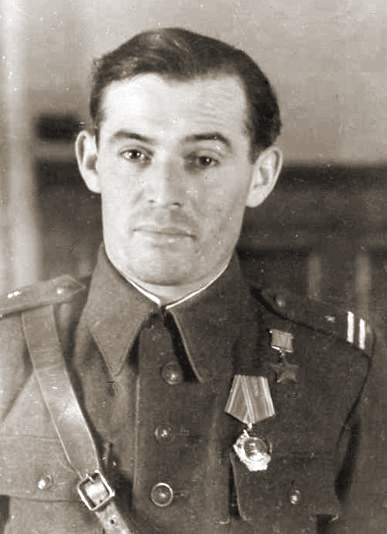
- Born: Dawid Szwarc; 11 October 1912; Grzymałów, Kingdom of Galicia and Lodomeria, Austria-Hungary (now Hrymailiv, Ternopil Oblast, Ukraine)
- Died: 13 November 1994 (aged 82); Warsaw, Poland
- Military career
- Allegiance: Poland
- Branch: International Brigades (1937–1939); Red Army (1941–1943); Polish People's Army (1943–1959)
- Service years: 1937–1959
- Rank: Brigadier General
- Units: 20th International Battalion; 1st Tadeusz Kościuszko Infantry Division; 8th Infantry Division
- Commands: 20th Battalion, International Brigades; 32nd Infantry Regiment, Second Army; Internal Security Corps
- Conflicts: Spanish Civil War; World War II; Anti-communist resistance in Poland
- Awards: Hero of the Soviet Union; Virtuti Militari (twice)

Juliusz Hibner (real name Dawid Szwarc; 11 October 1912 – 13 November 1994) was a brigadier general in the Polish People's Army and recipient of the title of Hero of Soviet Union. He also served as the commander of the Internal Security Corps and later became a nuclear physicist.

== Early life ==
Hibner was born in a poor Jewish family. His father joined the Zarudzia Region Council organized by the Bolsheviks during the Polish-Soviet War. In 1931, Hibner graduated from a gymnasium in Ternopil and in the summer of the same year, he joined the Young Communist League of Western Ukraine (KZMZU), an autonomous section of the Union of Polish Youth, where he was active in the propaganda division.

He also continued his activity with KZMZU during his studies at the Polytechnic University in Lwów, where he started studying in 1932, but he did not graduate. In 1933 he returned to Ternopil, where he continued his activity in KZMZU, acting for the benefit of Communist Party of Western Ukraine. In September 1934, he was arrested but soon released due to lack of evidence. He was arrested again in January 1935, but managed to escape. After a short stay on false documents in Lwów, he left for Warsaw in 1936. While working at a factory in Warsaw, he made contact with the Communist Party of Poland.

== Military career ==
In February 1937, he volunteered to go to Spain to fight in the ranks of the Spanish Republican Army, during the Spanish Civil War. Serving under the name Julek Hübner, he was assigned to the 20th International Battalion of the International Brigades, and in May 1937 he was admitted to the Communist Party of Spain. He was promoted quickly in his unit and in September 1937 he became the battalion's political commissar. In March 1938, it was transferred to line units, and he was soon promoted to the rank of captain, assuming the position of battalion commander.

In May 1938 he was wounded and was treated in hospital until July. In February 1939, along with the rest of the soldiers of the International Brigades, he was interned in France, where he became a member of the leadership of the 'Polish group part-organization' (Partorganizacji polskiej grupy). In March 1939, the group along with Hibner, took the initiative to return to Poland in the face of the threat of German aggression. Following the 1939 invasion of Poland, he moved to Soviet Union in 1940.

=== World War II ===
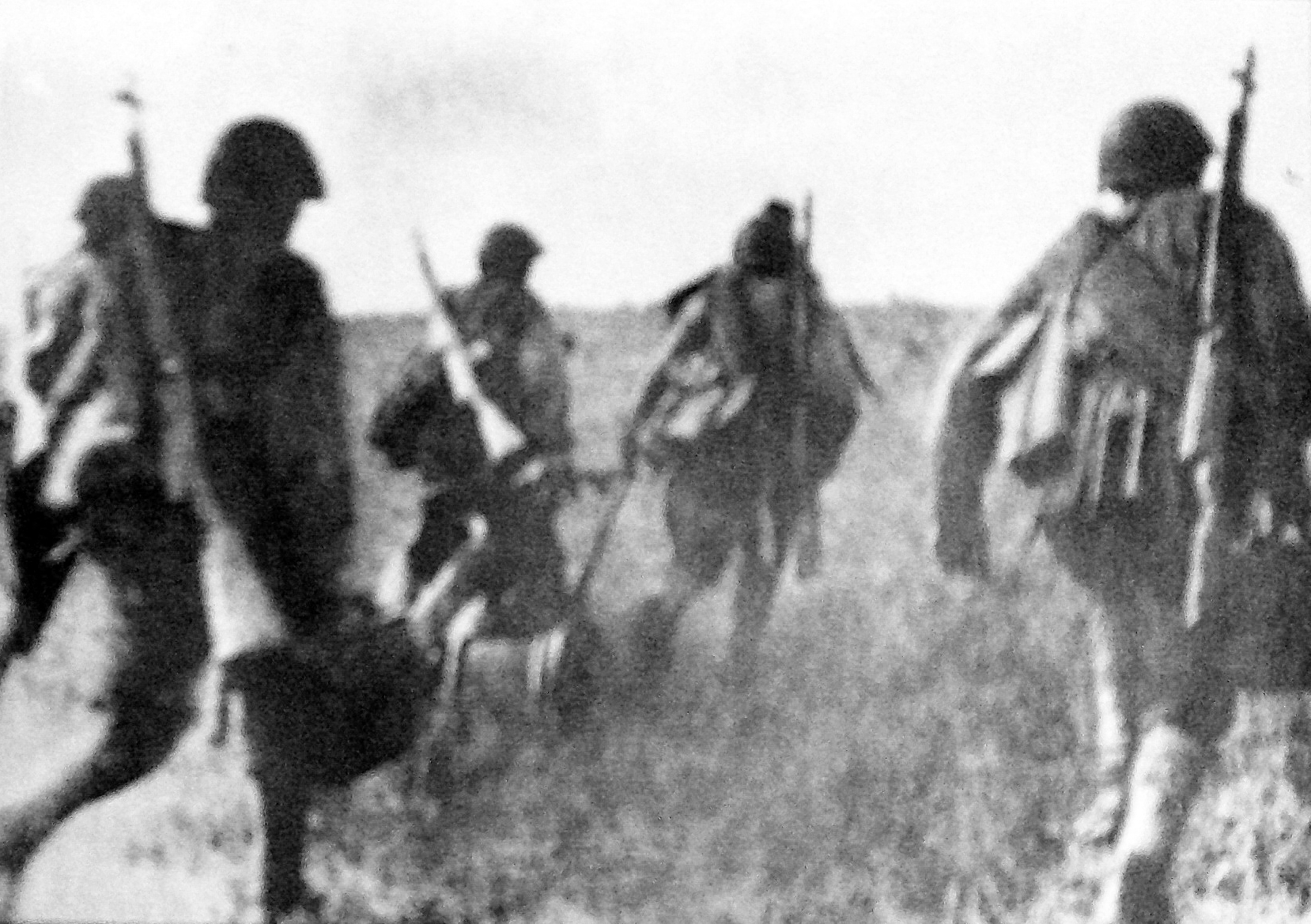
Troops of the Polish 1st Tadeusz Kościuszko Infantry Division at the Battle of Lenino

Following the outbreak of German invasion of Soviet Union in June 1941, Hibner joined the Red Army. On 29 August 1943, he was assigned to the 1st Tadeusz Kościuszko Infantry Division, where he was appointed as the deputy commander of the regiment's political affairs. He distinguished himself during the Battle of Lenino in 1943, when at the critical moment of the battle, he replaced the deceased battalion commander and despite receiving two severe wounds, he led the battalion. He was erroneously presumed dead and was posthumously nominated for the title of Hero of the Soviet Union, when in fact he was being treated at a military hospital. By the decree of the Presidium of the Supreme Soviet of the USSR of 11 November 1943, he was awarded the title of Hero of Soviet Union, along with an award of the Order of Lenin. After recovery, he was promoted to lieutenant colonel and appointed as regiment commander within the 2nd Polish Army.

On 11 March 1944, he was wounded again and sent to the hospital. After he recovered on 1 May 1944, he became a student at the Frunze Military Academy in Moscow. He was then appointed as the deputy commander of the 37th Infantry Regiment, and later as the commander of the 32nd Infantry Regiment of the 8th Infantry Division of 2nd Polish Army. During this time, he participated in the Battle of Bautzen. During the battle at the village of Malkowitz, he was wounded for the third and final time.

=== Post war ===
In 1946 he was the commander of the regiment stationed at Sanok. In September 1946, he was appointed deputy commander for the line affairs of the Internal Security Corps. In 1947, he took part in Operation Vistula as the deputy commander of the Operational Group of General Stefan Mossor.

On 27 April 1949, he appointed commander of the Internal Security Corps, after being promoted to brigadier general. On 29 April 1951, he became the commander of the Internal Forces of the Border Protection Troops and Internal Security Corps. On 23 August 1956, he became undersecretary of state in the Ministry of Internal Affairs and supervisor of the Internal Forces. The Internal Security Corps troops led by Hibner have been associated with numerous crimes and repressions against the Polish opposition activists and the civilian population. Hibner's rapid promotion in the Internal Security Corps and the Ministry of Public Security proves the trust in his command skills expressed by the leadership of the Polish Workers' Party and the Soviet authorities.

== Later life ==
Hibner retired from military service in 1959. Between 1960 and 1969, he obtained a PhD in physical sciences and worked at the Institute for Nuclear Research in Świerk. He defended his doctoral dissertation and taught physics at universities in Warsaw and Paris, after his retirement in 1969. In 1988, he left the Polish United Workers' Party.

Hibner died on 13 November 1994, at the age of 82. He is buried at the Powązki Military Cemetery in Warsaw. Hibner's wife Irena Bozena Puchalska-Hibner, who was a French and Polish physicist, wrote memoirs of her husband which was published in 2001. It was later translated and published in French, in 2004.

== Awards and decorations ==
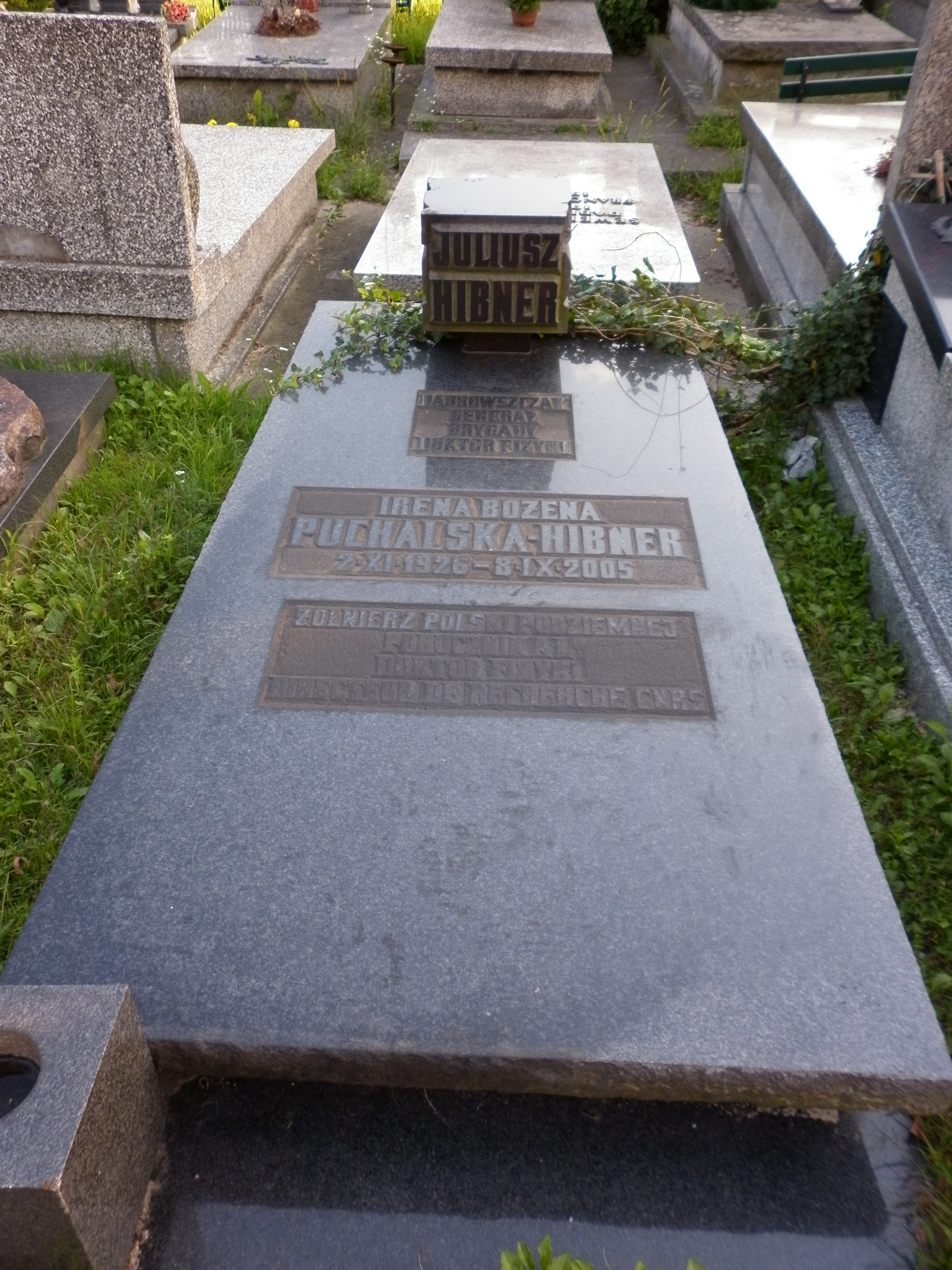
Hibner's tomb at the Powązki Military Cemetery

- Poland:
  - Gold Cross of the Virtuti Militari
  - Silver Cross of the Virtuti Militari
  - Order of the Cross of Grunwald, 3rd class
  - Medal for Merit in the Field of Glory, 2nd class
  - Medal of the Armed Forces in the Service of the Fatherland, Bronze
  - Partisan Cross
  - Medal "For Oder, Neisse and the Baltic"
  - Medal "For Warsaw 1939-1945"
- Soviet Union:
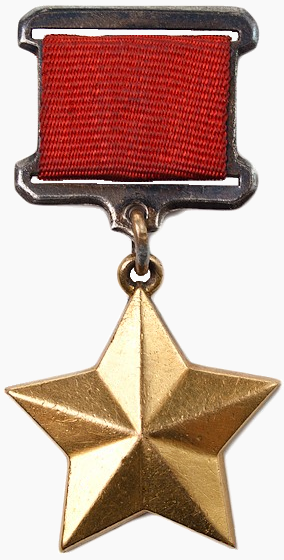
  - Hero of the Soviet Union (11 November 1943)
  - Order of Lenin (11 November 1943)
  - Medal "For the Liberation of Warsaw" (1945)
  - Medal "For the Victory over Germany in the Great Patriotic War 1941–1945" (1945)
