= 228th Mixed Brigade =

228th Mixed Brigade 228.ª Brigada Mixta
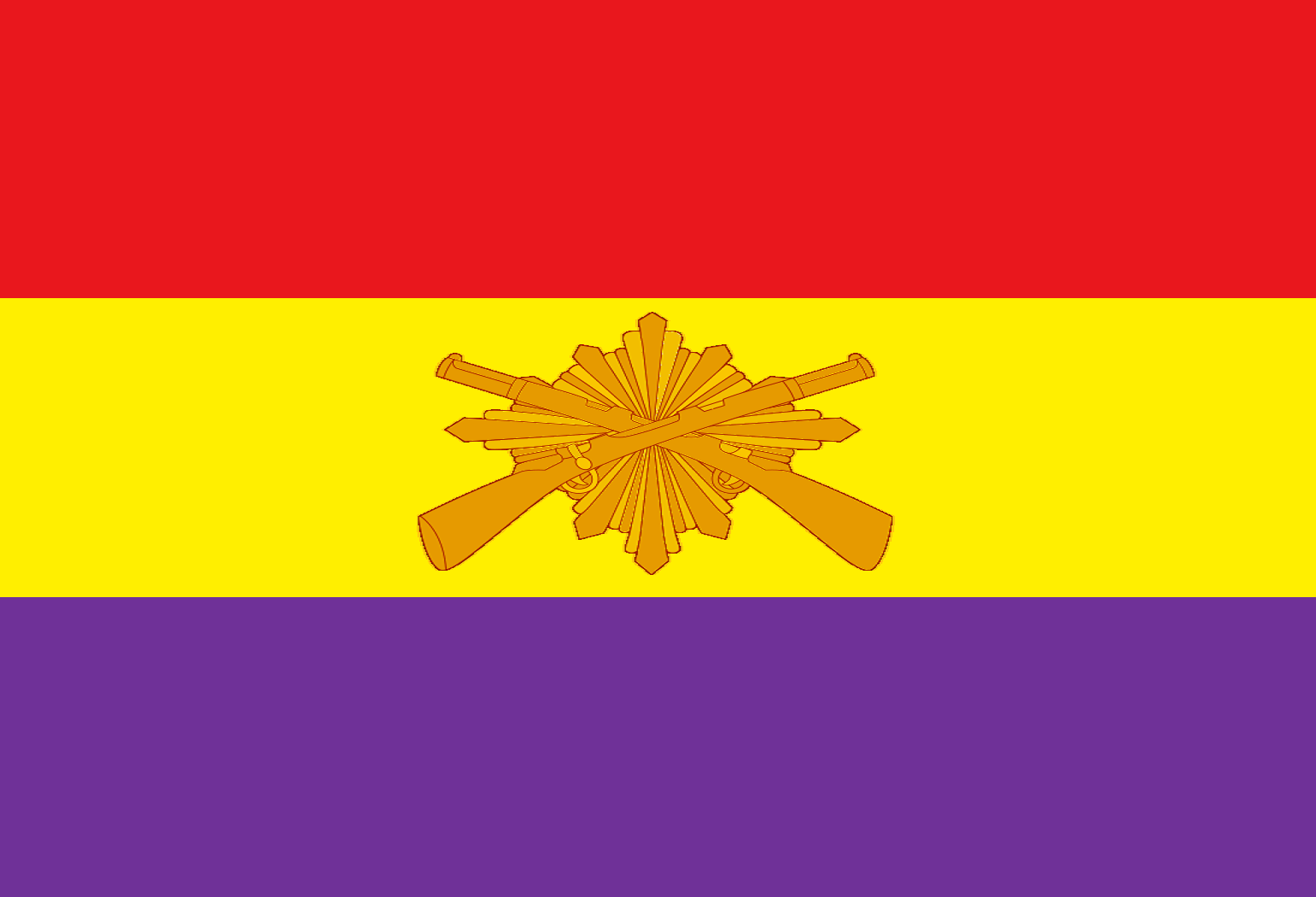
- Standard of the Carabineros Corps
- Active: 1937–1939
- Country: Spain
- Branch: Spanish Republican Army
- Type: Mixed Brigade
- Role: Home Defence
- Size: Four battalions: The 909, 910, 911 and 912
- Part of: 62nd Division (1938 - 1939)
- Garrison/HQ: La Seu d'Urgell
- Engagements: Spanish Civil War

Commanders
- Notable commanders: Miguel Bascuñana Sánchez

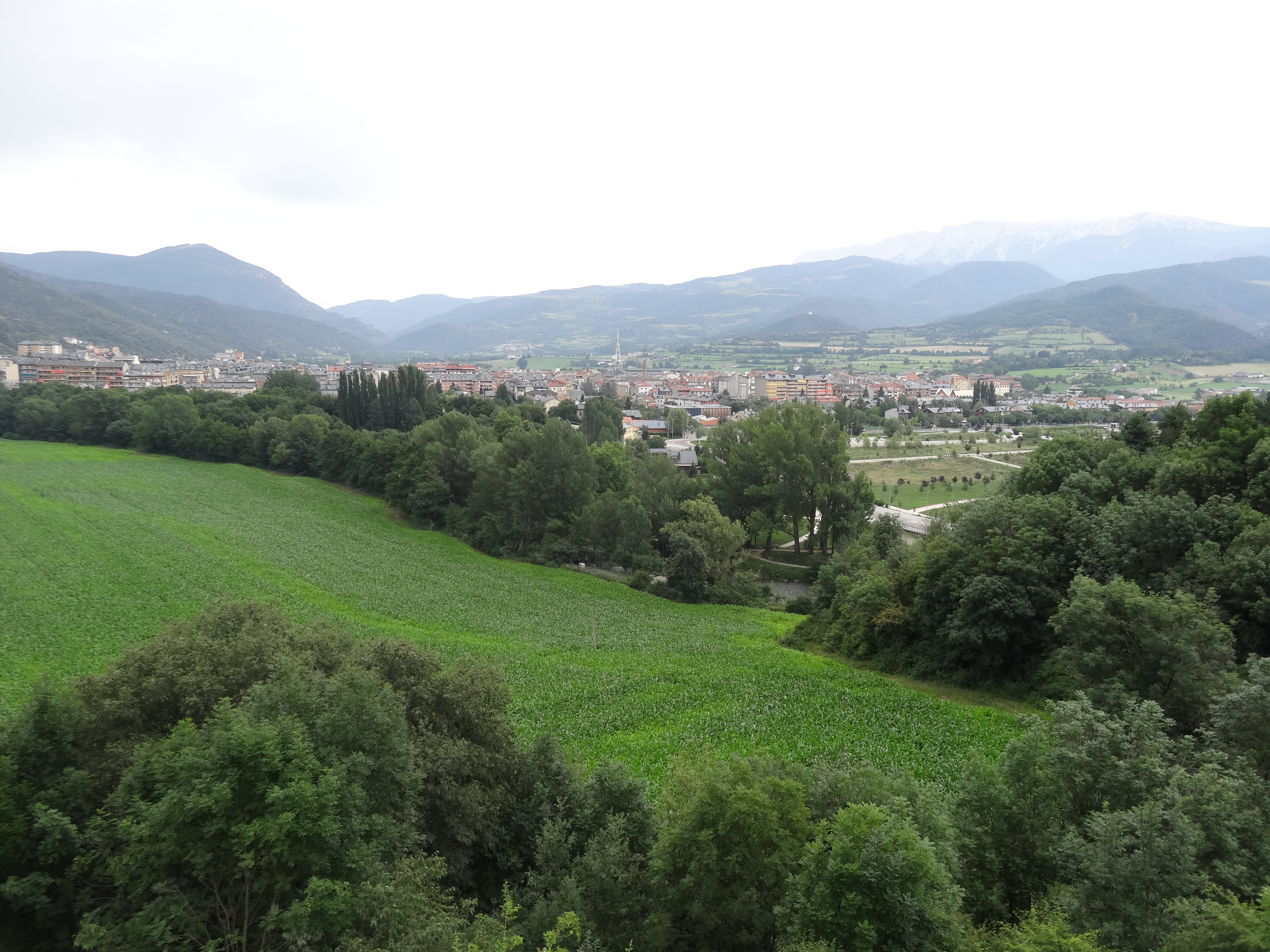
View of La Seu d'Urgell, where the 228th Mixed Brigade was formed in the winter of 1938.

The 228th Mixed Brigade (Spanish: 228.ª Brigada Mixta), was a short-lived mixed brigade of the Spanish Republican Army in the Spanish Civil War. It was formed in the last months of the Civil War with battalions belonging to the Carabineros corps. Its first and only leader was the Carabineros Commander Miguel Bascuñana Sánchez.

This unit disappeared in early 1939 during the crushing advance of the Francoist armies across Catalonia.

== History ==
The 228th Mixed Brigade was hastily established in December 1938 in La Seu d'Urgell (Seo de Urgel) in the Pyrenees border area. It was organized with the following Carabineros battalions:

- 21st, which became the 909 Battalion of the mixed brigade.
- 39th, which became the 910 Battalion
- 47th, which became the 911 Battalion
- 55th, which became the 912 Battalion

Remainders of Spanish troops from the International Brigades after these were disbanded, such as the 47th Battalion of the XII International Brigade, were also integrated in the 228th Mixed Brigade.

The brigade was theoretically included in the 62nd Division —a division which never became functional— under the XI Army Corps, but in practice it would never be part of the Republican Army division structure.

=== Unknown end of the brigade ===
The 228th Mixed Brigade was trusted with the mission of covering a sector of the Lower Ebro zone at the time of the Catalonia Offensive. However, the threat of becoming surrounded by rebel troops soon forced the whole unit to withdraw. After this there are no further news of the 228th Mixed Brigade.

== See also ==
- Carabineros
- Group of Eastern Region Armies
