= 87th Mixed Brigade =

87th Mixed Brigade 87.ª Brigada Mixta
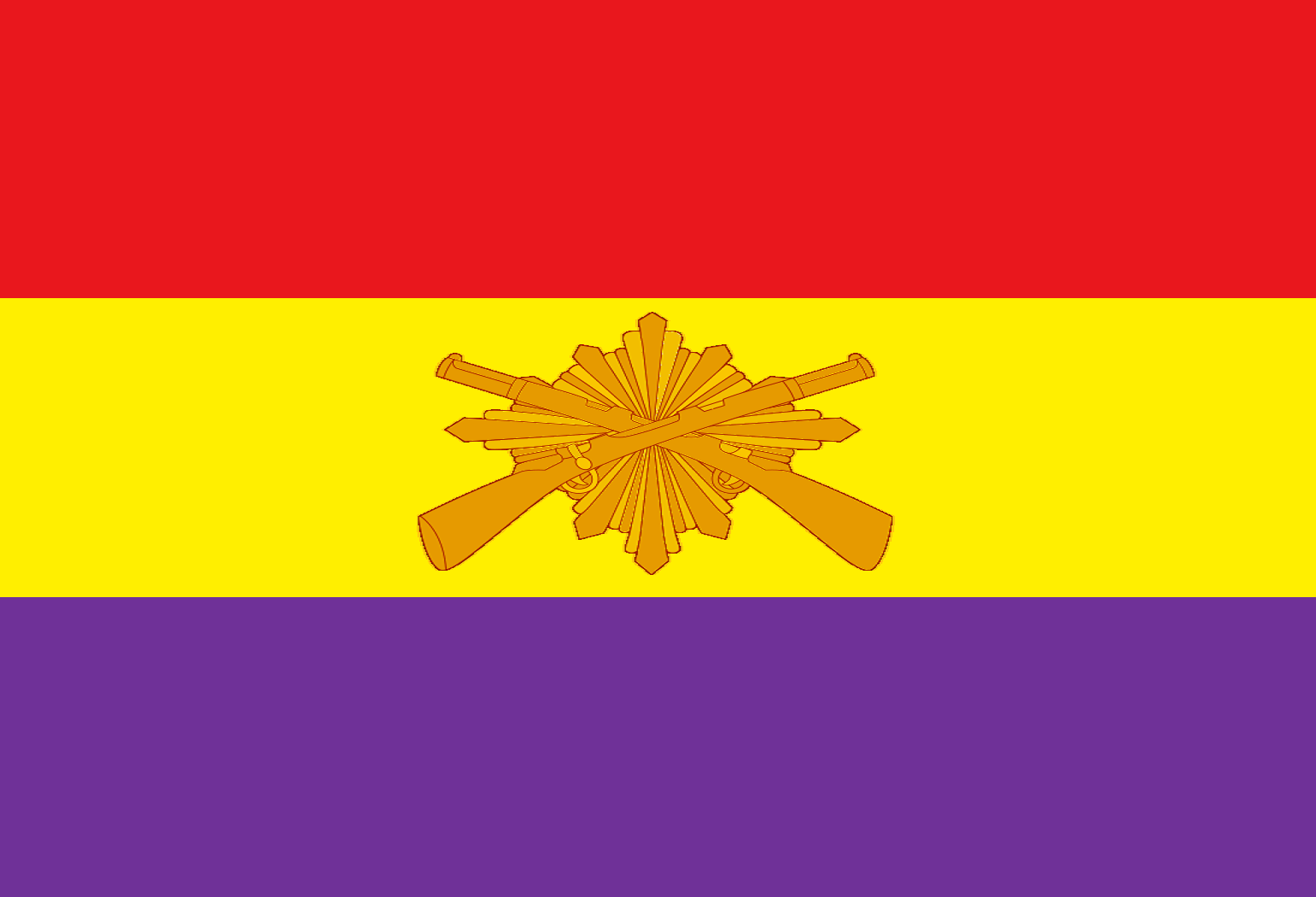
- Standard of the Carabineros Corps
- Active: March 1937– March 1939
- Country: Spain
- Branch: Spanish Republican Army
- Type: Mixed Brigade
- Role: Home Defence
- Size: Four battalions: The 345, 346, 347, and 348
- Part of: 40th Division (1937 - 1939)
- Garrison/HQ: Lorca
- Engagements: Spanish Civil War: Battle of Teruel; Levante Offensive
- Decorations: Medal of Bravery

Commanders
- Notable commanders: Carlos Amores Cantos; Andrés Nieto Carmona

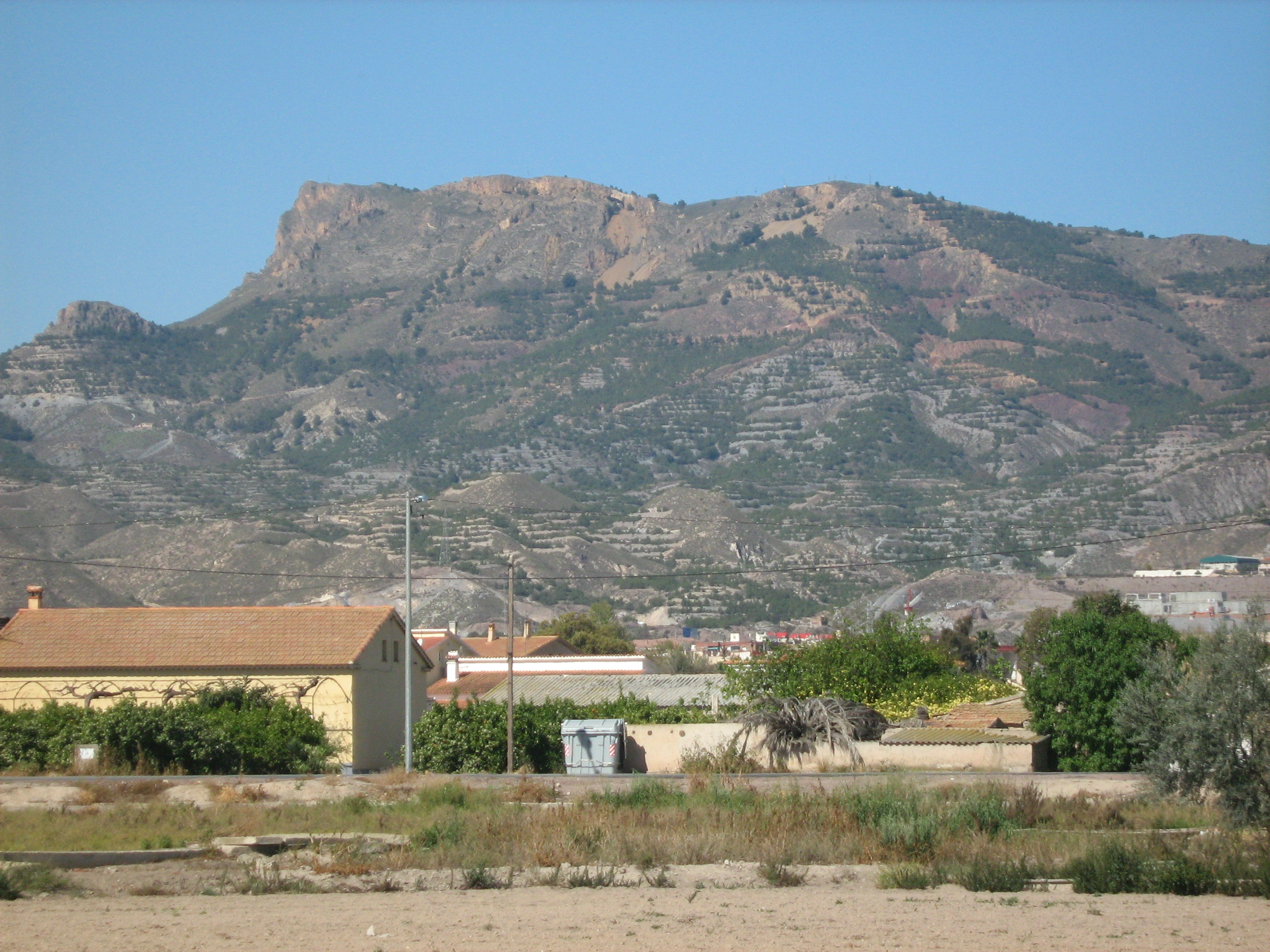
View of Peña Rubia mountain in Lorca, the town where the 87th Mixed Brigade was established in 1937.

The 87th Mixed Brigade (Spanish: 87.ª Brigada Mixta), was a mixed brigade of the Spanish Republican Army in the Spanish Civil War. It was formed in March 1937 with battalions of the Carabineros corps. Its first commander was Infantry Colonel Carlos Amores Cantos, who was succeeded by Militia Major Andrés Nieto Carmona.

The unit's first Battalion (the 345) published the "Combate" newspaper.

== History ==
The 87th Mixed Brigade was established in the spring 1937 in Lorca. During the instruction period the unit was under the command of Colonel Carlos Amores Cantos. At the onset of the Civil War Amores was Commander at the Nr 10 Mobilization and Reserve Center (Centro de Movilización y Reserva n° 10) at Calatayud and happened to be in Madrid. Later Colonel Amores handed over the command of the unit to Major Andrés Nieto Carmona. The Chief of Staff was Militia Captain Agustín Martínez.

=== Battle of Teruel ===
The 87th Mixed Brigade was soon sent to the Teruel Front and was put under the 40th Division. Before taking part in the Battle of Teruel Nieto was replaced by Militia Major Alfredo Ramos Gómez.

The unit had its baptism of fire at rebel-held Teruel, which it reached via the Escandón Pass along the Sagunto road, occupying the Vértice Castellar and Castralvo, arriving within 500 m of Teruel town. On 21 December the 87th Mixed Brigade attacked the city from the left sector of the right flank, arriving the next day to the Torico Square in the center and taking over the Guardia Civil headquarters and the Cathedral. Following this it laid siege to the Seminary building. It left the city on 31 December and on 17 January 1938 it was in the vanguard, trying to contain the enemy advance. On 25 January it tried to conquer the El Muletón —an emblematic hill that rises above the Alfambra River valley, but its effort ended in failure and the unit was relieved by the 222nd Mixed Brigade.

=== Later phase and end of the unit ===
The 87th Mixed Brigade later took part in the effort to contain the Levante Offensive where it was more successful that at Teruel. Together with its division it the unit was collectively awarded the Medal of Bravery. Even so, it could not contain the advance of the enemy, it only managed to delay it. Slowly, it withdrew together with other units until reaching the protection afforded by the XYZ Line. At the end of the war and the surrender of the Spanish Republic, the 87th Mixed Brigade was part of the reserve of the Levantine Army.

== See also ==
- Mixed Brigades
- Carabineros

== Bibliography ==
- Alpert, Michael. The Republican Army in the Spanish Civil War, 1936–1939, Cambridge University Press. 2013. ISBN 978-1107028739
- Engel, Carlos. Historia de las Brigadas Mixtas del E. P. de la República, Almena. Madrid. 1999. ISBN 84-922644-7-0
- Salas Larrazábal, Ramón. Historia del Ejército Popular de la República, La Esfera de los Libros, Madrid. 2006. ISBN 84-9734-465-0
