= 222nd Mixed Brigade =

222nd Mixed Brigade 222.ª Brigada Mixta
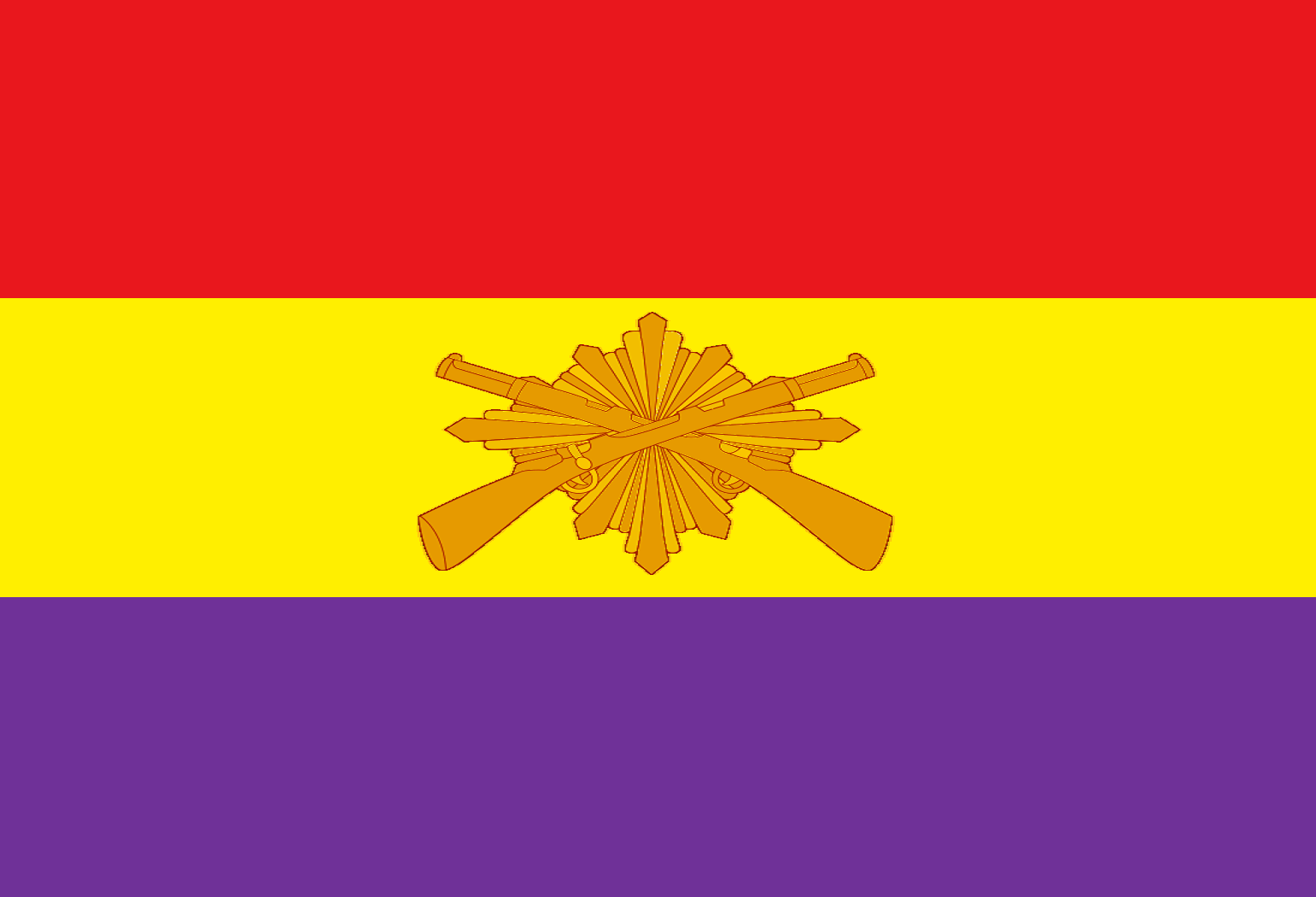
- Standard of the Carabineros Corps
- Active: 1937–1939
- Country: Spain
- Branch: Spanish Republican Army
- Type: Mixed Brigade
- Role: Home Defence
- Size: Four battalions: The 885, 886, 887 and 888
- Part of: Coastal Defence (1937); 40th Division (1937 - 1939)
- Garrison/HQ: Cartagena
- Engagements: Spanish Civil War
- Decorations: Medal of Bravery

Commanders
- Notable commanders: Tiburcio Díaz Carrasco

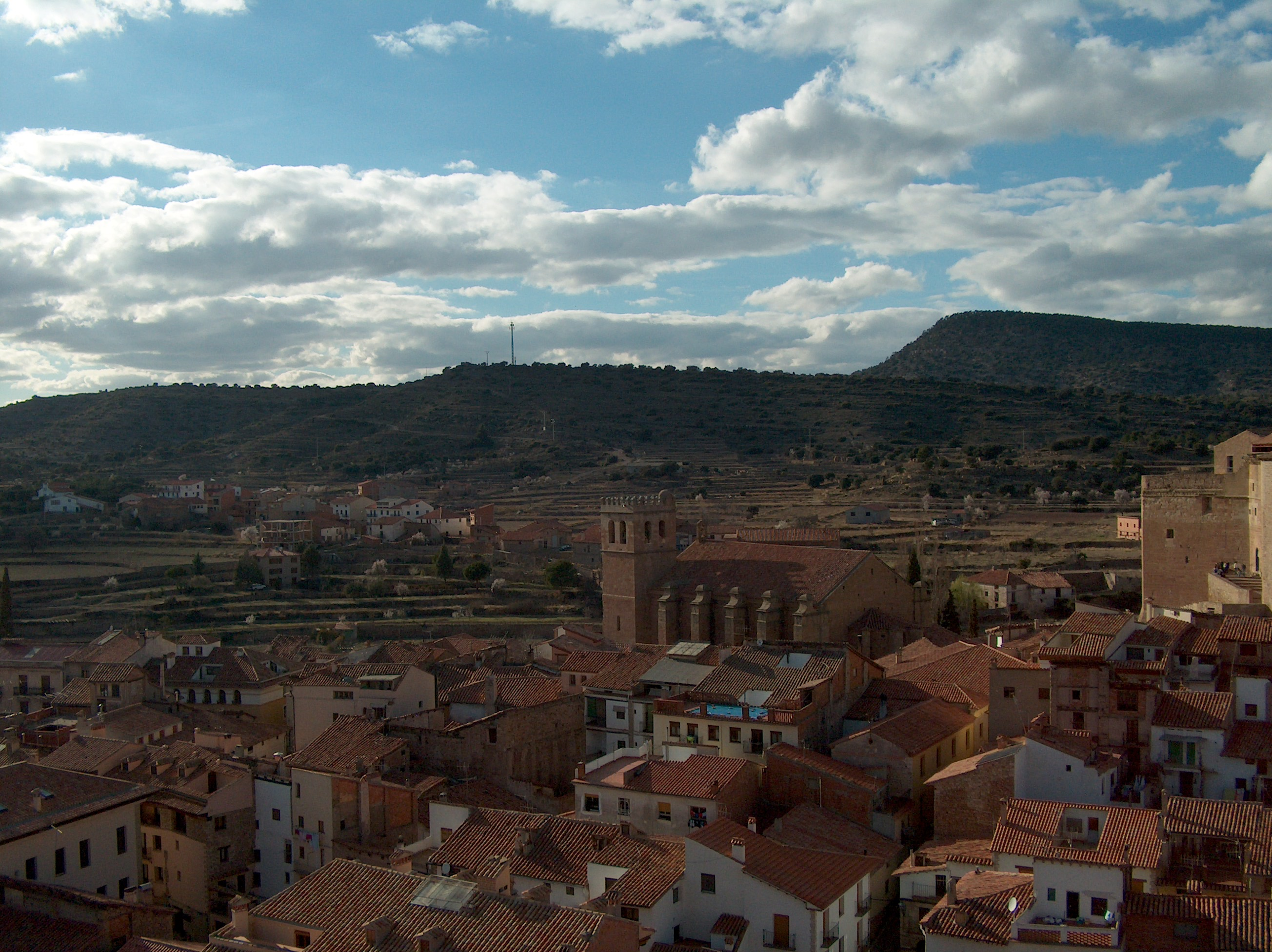
View of Mora de Rubielos and its surroundings, where the mixed brigades of the 40th division reconquered two important positions from the enemy.

The 222nd Mixed Brigade (Spanish: 222.ª Brigada Mixta), was a mixed brigade of the Spanish Republican Army in the Spanish Civil War. It was formed in the summer of 1937 with battalions of the Carabineros corps. Its only commander was the Carabineros Lieutenant Tiburcio Díaz Carrasco.

== History ==
The 222nd Mixed Brigade was established in the summer 1937 in Lorca, Vélez-Rubio, Alhama and Totana. It was organized with the following Carabineros battalions:

- 18th, which became the 885 Battalion of the mixed brigade.
- 19th, which became the 886 Battalion.
- 24th, which became the 887 Battalion.
- 38th, which became the 888 Battalion.

Two of these battalions were from the 86th Mixed Brigade.

=== First phase ===
The brigade was first engaged in Coastal Defence under the Group of Central Region Armies (GERC) and its members were garrisoned in Cartagena, guarding the town's military facilities.

In December 1937 the 222nd Mixed Brigade became part of the reserve of the Andalusian Army, relieving the 87th Mixed Brigade of its duties in the coast of Almería. In late February 1938 the unit was placed under the 40th Division of the XIX Army Corps of the Levantine Army (Ejército de Levante) and moved to the Teruel Front. However it arrived to the Teruel area when the combats were over.

=== Levante Offensive and end of the unit ===
The brigade took part in the effort to fight back the rebel Levante Offensive where it recaptured the Cota 1.196 and the Vértice Marrón positions from the enemy. For these actions the 40th Division, to which the brigade belonged, was awarded the Medal of Bravery.

In July 1938 the 40th Division was placed under the XVII Army Corps led by Lieutenant Colonel García Vallejo. When the Francoist offensive in the Levant ended, the brigade remained in the same sector as strategic reserve until the end of the Civil War. The final fate of some of the brigade's members is unknown.

== See also ==
- Mixed Brigades
- Carabineros
