= 222nd Brigade =

222nd Brigade may refer to:

- 222nd Mixed Brigade, Spain
- 222nd Infantry Brigade (United Kingdom)
- 222nd Brigade, Royal Field Artillery, United Kingdom

== See also ==
- 222nd Regiment (disambiguation)
