= Security and Assault Corps =

Spanish former police corps

Security and Assault Corps Cuerpo de Seguridad y Asalto
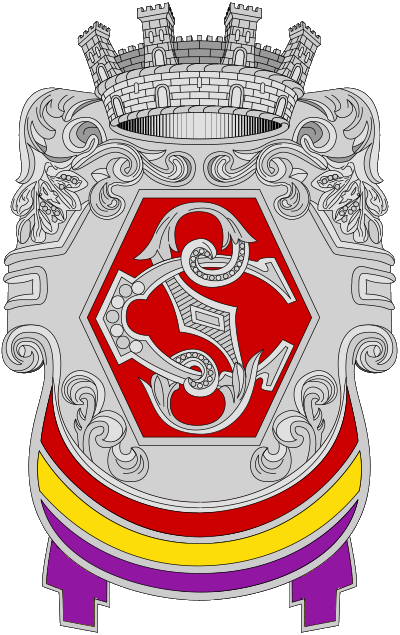
- Common name: Assault Guards

Agency overview
- Formed: 9 February 1932
- Preceding agency: Compañías de Vanguardia
- Dissolved: 27 of December 1936 (Republican Spain) 8 of March 1941 (Francoist Spain)
- Superseding agency: Cuerpo de Seguridad Interior (Republican Spain) Policía Armada (Francoist Spain)

Jurisdictional structure
- National agency: Spain
- Operations jurisdiction: Spain
- Governing body: Ministry of Governance
- General nature: Civilian police

Operational structure
- Overseen by: Directorate-General of Security
- Headquarters: Dirección General de Seguridad
- Parent agency: Cuerpo de Seguridad y Asalto

The Assault Guards, officially known as the Security and Assault Corps (Spanish; Cuerpo de Seguridad y Asalto), were the riot police units of the urban police force of Spain under the Second Spanish Republic. The Assault Guards were special paramilitary police units created by the Spanish Republic in 1931 to deal with urban and political violence. Most of the recruits in the Assault Guards were ex-military personnel, many of them veterans. It was dissolved in the loyalist zone on 27 December 1936 and its personnel and equipment transferred to the newly created Cuerpo de Seguridad Interior while the Francoist regime would go on to disband them in 1941 as part of a broader reorganization of the regime's internal security. The remaining personnel would be subjected to internal purges to ensure loyalty and transferred over to the newly created Policía Armada.

At the onset of the Spanish Civil War, there were 18,000 Assault Guards. About 12,600 stayed loyal to the Republican government, while the other 5,400 defected to the rebel faction. Many of its units took part in front line actions on both sides, often being used as shock troops due to their high degree of training, discipline and specialised equipment.

== Origins ==
Following the end of the Spanish monarchy in April 1931, the new Republican government took precautions to bolster the riot control capabilities of Spain's urban police force, the Cuerpo de Seguridad. Until then, no specialised riot control unit existed in Spain, which meant the regular members of the Cuerpo de seguridad had to respond to large riots and demonstrations as well as performing crowd control duties they weren't trained or equipped for. This meant that the Cuerpo de Seguridad was often overwhelmed which then resulted in the government having to resort to the rural Guardia Civil, which was better trained, more mobile and fielded more members but lacked proper equipment for crowd control which often resulted in unnecessary injuries and deaths while containing riots. For this, the minister of governance Miguel Maura created units called Secciones de Vanguardia (Vanguard Sections) from the Sección de Gimnasia (Gymnastics Section) which had previously been created in 1930 by general Mola. These units had encompassed the more physically active and able bodied members of the Cuerpo de Seguridad who were organized into 25 man squads armed with their standard issue pistols, rubber battons wrapped in leather and tear gas grenades. The Vanguard Sections first saw action in july 1931, breaking up a violent strike by workers of the Compañía Telefónica.

The performance of the new Vanguard Sections was deemed satisfactory which in turn resulted in the signing of decree on the 5th of February which saw the expansion of the Vanguard Sections. This expansion saw the recruitment of 2500 new guards and 100 drivers alongside the acquisition of 60 trucks and 40 phaeton type cars to transport troops and high pressure water tanks as well as the acquisition of the uniforms and armaments to dress and arm the guards along with facilities to house and maintain the newly acquired vehicles. A second decree from the 9th of February saw the formal transformation of the Vanguard Sections into the Cuerpo de Seguridad y Asalto, their organizations, entrance tests as well as the creation of a cavalry section within the corps.

== The Spanish Civil War ==
During the Spanish Civil War, Assault Guards stayed largely loyal to the Republican government. Of all the reserve forces that had remained in the government zone, the Assault Guard was the most highly regarded by most of the population. This made a large number of serving soldiers decide to join this body; to avoid the misgivings and suspicions that military affiliation had created among the workers' militias. This fact reached the point that the President of the Ministry of War, Largo Caballero, had to prohibit Army officers from joining the Assault Guard without authorization from the Ministry of War. The Assault Guards distinguished themselves as a reliable and shock infantry to which the Republic always entrusted its most delicate operations, such as the battles of Madrid and Guadalajara, the securing of Belchite, and the suppression of the events in Barcelona during May. Later in the war, the Assault Corps became the elite of the Spanish Republican Army. The writer George Orwell reflected it in one of his most outstanding works:

"They were splendid troops, much the best I had seen in Spain, and, though I suppose they were in a sense 'the enemy', I could not help liking the look of them [...]. I was used to the ragged, scarcely-armed militia on the Aragón front, and I had not known that the Republic possessed troops like these. It was not only that they were picked men physically, it was their weapons that most astonished me..."

The Carabineros (frontier guards) and the Assault Guards were the Spanish police and paramilitary corps where the 1936 coup found the least support. When the Civil War began, over 70% of the Assault Guards stayed loyal to the Spanish Republic. On the other hand, in the Civil Guard the breakup of loyalists and rebels was distributed evenly at around 50%, although the highest authority of the corps, Inspector General Sebastián Pozas, remained loyal to the republican government.

== Ranks ==
Before the Civil War, eight-pointed and six-pointed silver stars were part of the officers' uniforms of the Assault Guards. Following the breakout of the Civil War, and the ensuing reorganization of the Spanish Republican Armed Forces some changes were introduced and ranks were simplified.

The silver 8-pointed and six-pointed stars that had been worn between 1931 and 1936 were replaced by the five pointed red star.

=== Officers ===
Rank group	General / flag officers	Senior officers			Junior officers
Cuerpo de Seguridad y Asalto (1931–1936)
Cuerpo de Seguridad y Asalto (1931–1936)		Coronel	Teniente coronel	Comandante	Capitán	Teniente	Alférez
Cuerpo de Seguridad y Asalto (1936–1939)
Cuerpo de Seguridad y Asalto (1936–1939)		Coronel	Teniente coronel	Comandante	Capitán	Teniente	Alférez

=== Non-commissioned ranks ===
Rank group	Senior NCOs					Junior NCOs	Enlisted
Cuerpo de Seguridad y Asalto (1931–1936)
Cuerpo de Seguridad y Asalto (1931–1936)	Subteniente	Subayudante	Brigada	Sargento primero	Sargento	Cabo	Guardia primero	Guardia
Cuerpo de Seguridad y Asalto (1936–1939)
Cuerpo de Seguridad y Asalto (1936–1939)		Brigada		Sargento		Cabo		Guardia

== See also ==
- Carabineros
- Spanish Civil Guard
- Spanish Republican Army
