= Carabineros =

Defunct Spanish paramilitary force

Carabineros Corps Cuerpo de Carabineros
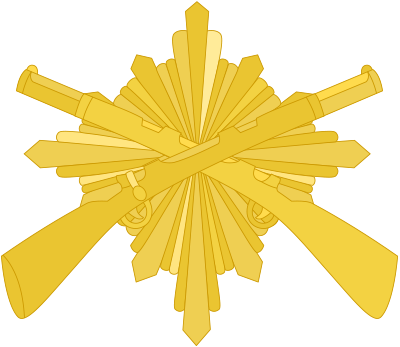
- Common name: Carabineros
- Motto: Moralidad, lealtad, valor y disciplina Morality, loyalty, courage and discipline

Agency overview
- Formed: 1829
- Dissolved: 1940
- Superseding agency: Guardia Civil

Jurisdictional structure
- National agency: Spain
- Operations jurisdiction: Spain
- Governing body: Ministry of Finance
- Constituting instrument: Real decreto organizando el Cuerpo de Carabineros de Costas y Fronteras para impedir el contrabando, 31 de marzo de 1829
- General nature: Gendarmerie; Civilian police
- Specialist jurisdictions: National border patrol, security, integrity; Customs, excise, gambling

Operational structure
- Overseen by: Directorate-General of Security

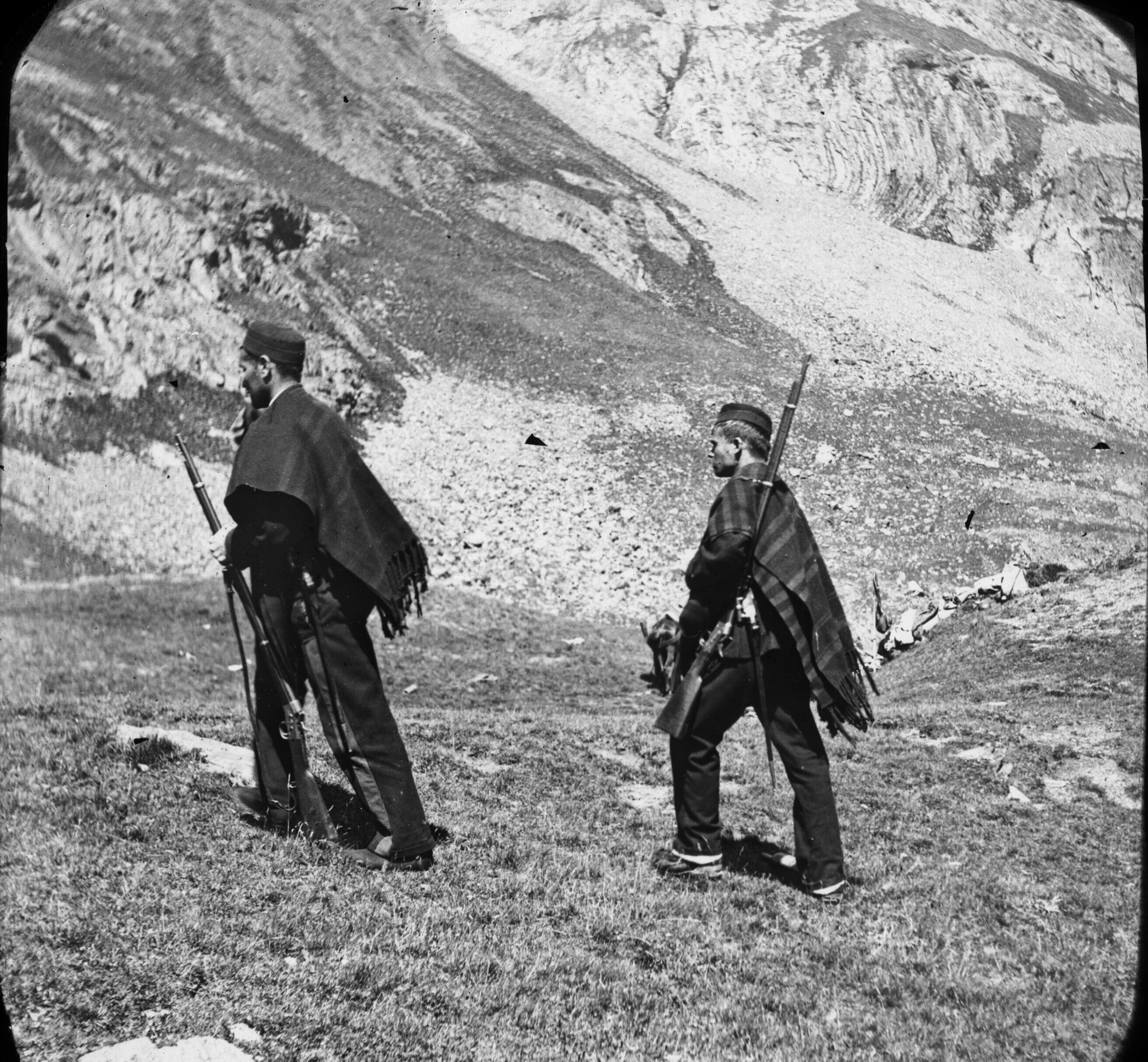
Two Carabineros near Benasque in the Pyrenees, 1892.

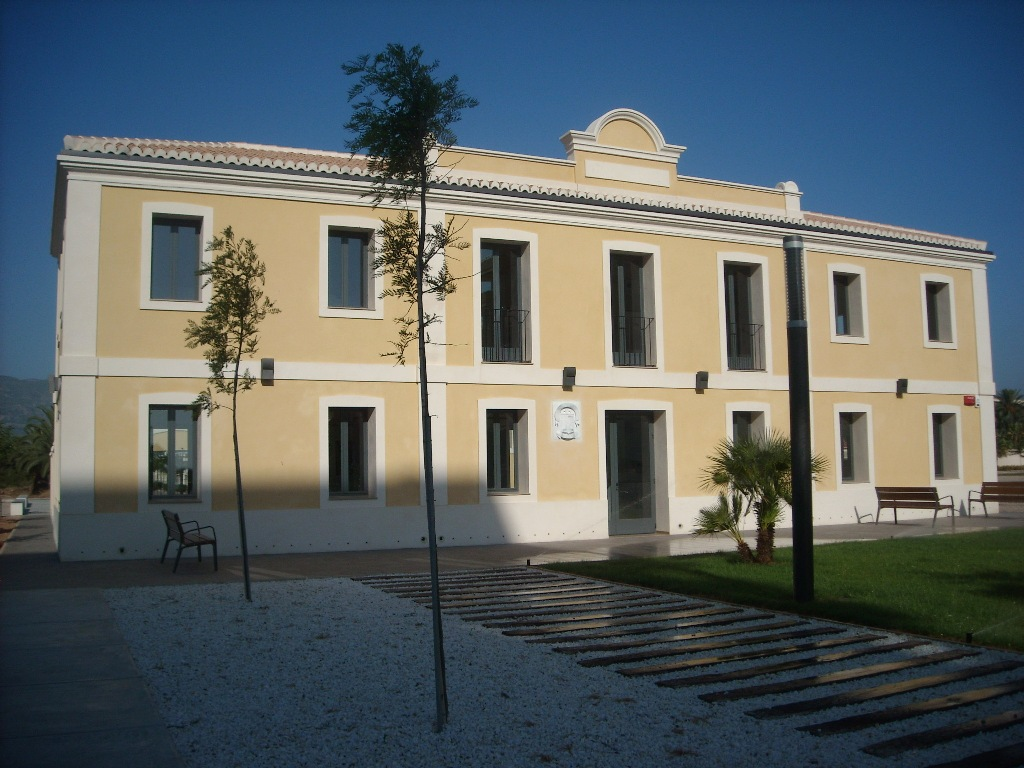
Former Carabineros headquarters at Xeraco, Valencia restored in 2011

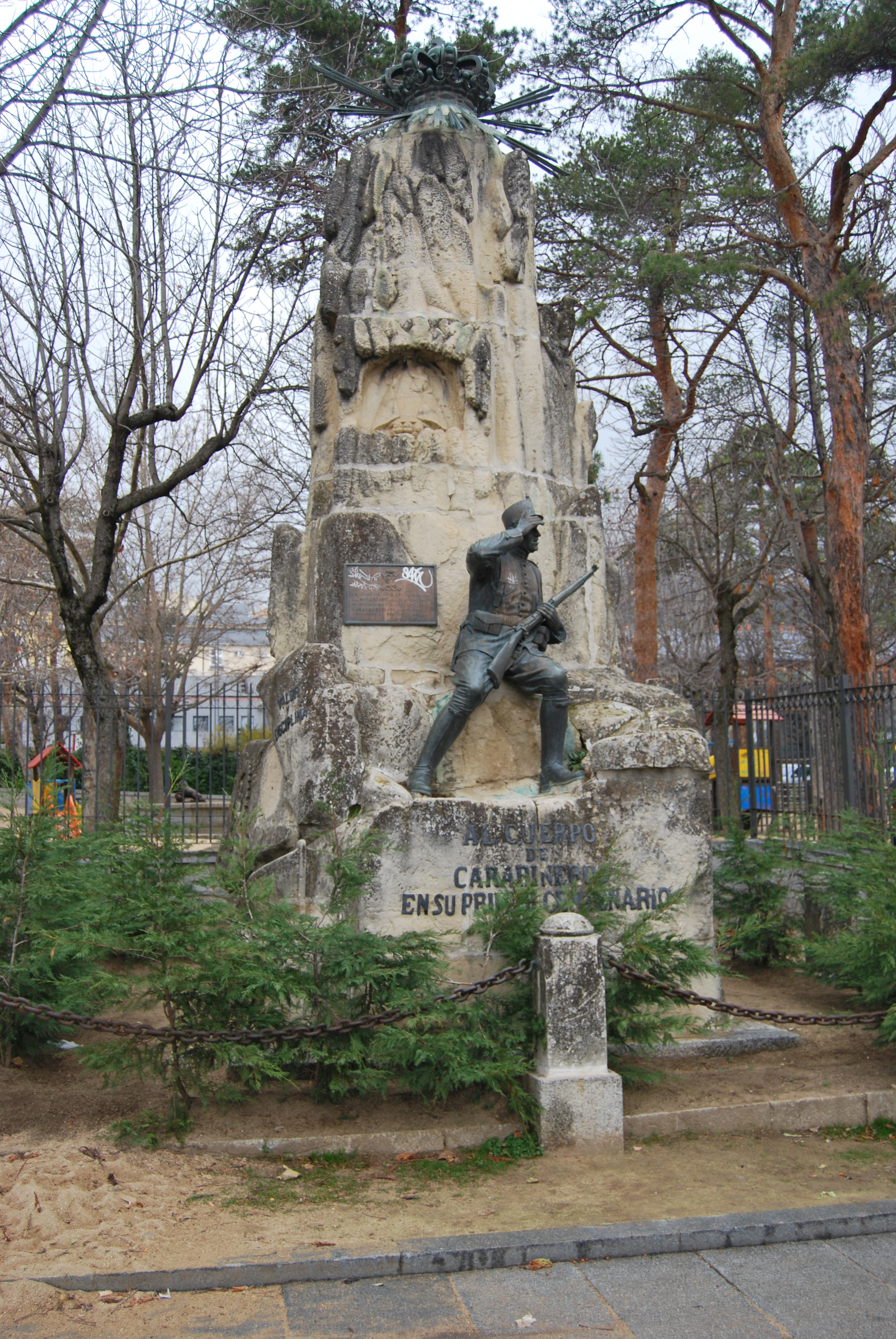
1929 monument to the Carabineros at El Escorial.

The Carabineros was an armed carabinier force of Spain under both the monarchy and the Second Republic. The formal mission of this paramilitary gendarmerie was to patrol the coasts and borders of the country, operating against fraud and smuggling. As such the Carabineros performed the dual roles of frontier guards and customs officials.

The force was established in 1829 and lasted until 1940 when it was summarily disbanded and merged with the Guardia Civil.

== Motto and uniforms ==
The motto of the Carabineros was: Moralidad, lealtad, valor y disciplina (Morality, Loyalty, Courage, and Discipline). They were stationed along all the Spanish land borders, in the maritime provinces and in Madrid.

Their uniform was dark blue with red facings until the 1920s and thereafter greyish green.

== Commanders ==
Among the notable commanders of the corps included José Olaguer Feliú (1923–1927), José María Galán and Gonzalo Queipo de Llano (1934–1936).

== History ==
=== First hundred years ===
The Carabineros Corps was established as the 'Royal Carabinier Corps of the Coasts and Borders' (Real Cuerpo de Carabineros de Costas y Fronteras) by a royal decree issued by King Fernando VII on 9 March 1829. It was led by Field Marshal José Ramón Rodil at the time that Luis López Ballesteros was Minister of Finance. Shortly thereafter, in 1833, the corps was renamed as 'Carabiniers of the Royal Finance' (Carabineros de la Real Hacienda). Placed under the Finance Ministry they went through a period of gradual neglect and by 1842 the Carabineros were almost dysfunctional as a corps. Field Marshal Martín José de Iriarte was then entrusted with their reorganization. Thus the corps was reformed and re-organised as the 'Carabinier Corps of the Kingdom' (Cuerpo de Carabineros del Reino) in order to replace the former ineffective and discredited body.

At the time of the Restoration the Carabineros and the Guardia Civil, the other paramilitary Spanish corps, were placed under the War Ministry, "for a better organization and discipline", being given a military character by means of a law that developed and modified certain aspects of the 1878 Constitutive Army Law (Ley Constitutiva del Ejército). The latter set the functions of the Armed Forces following the Spanish Constitution of 1876.

In August 1923 Lieutenant General José Olaguer Feliú was named General Director of the Carabineros. Despite this being a time of economic hardship, he was able to improve conditions of service within the corps; reducing the daily working hours to twelve. He also achieved the expansion and improvement of the Carabinier Corps' Schools (Colegios del Cuerpo de Carabineros), where recruits were trained. General Olaguer Feliu was responsible for the construction of new quarters and repairing the existing ones; for the founding of schools for the sons and daughters of the Carabineros in certain locations. Finally José Olaguer Feliú provided better schooling and conditions for orphans of Carabineros at the San Lorenzo de El Escorial Carabinier' Orphans School (Colegio de Huérfanos de Carabineros de San Lorenzo del Escorial).

In 1929, on the occasion of the 100th anniversary of the corps, a monument was built in recognition of the Carabineros, at San Lorenzo del Escorial. In addition the Great Cross of the Civil Order of Beneficence (Gran Cruz de la Orden Civil de Beneficencia) was awarded collectively to the members of the corps by King Alfonso XIII for deeds and services rendered by the Carabineros in fighting fires, floods and the rescuing of shipwrecked persons.

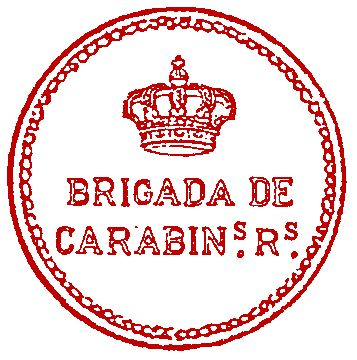
Royal Carabineros Seal; 1910.

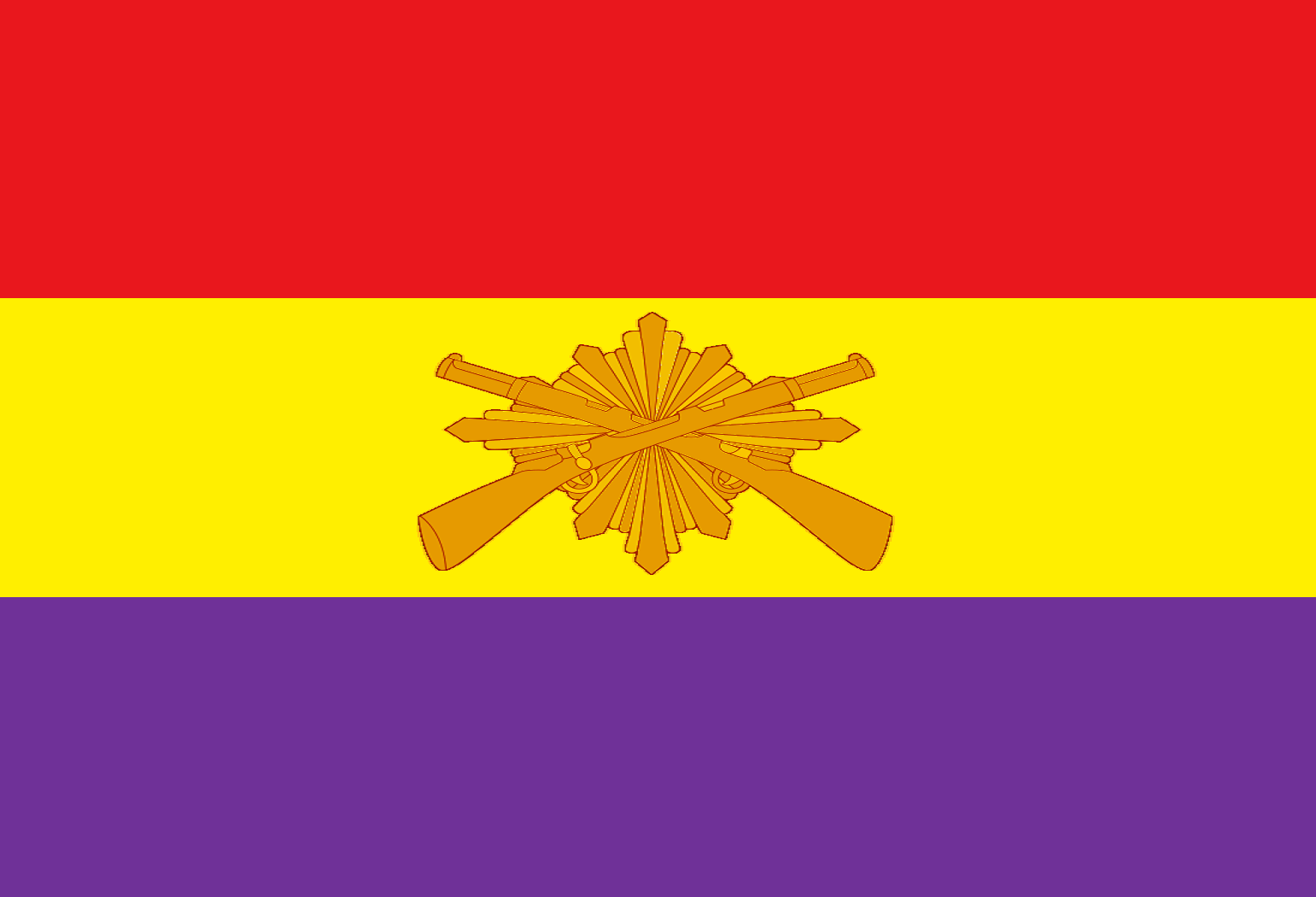
Republican Carabineros Civil War standard.

=== Philippines ===
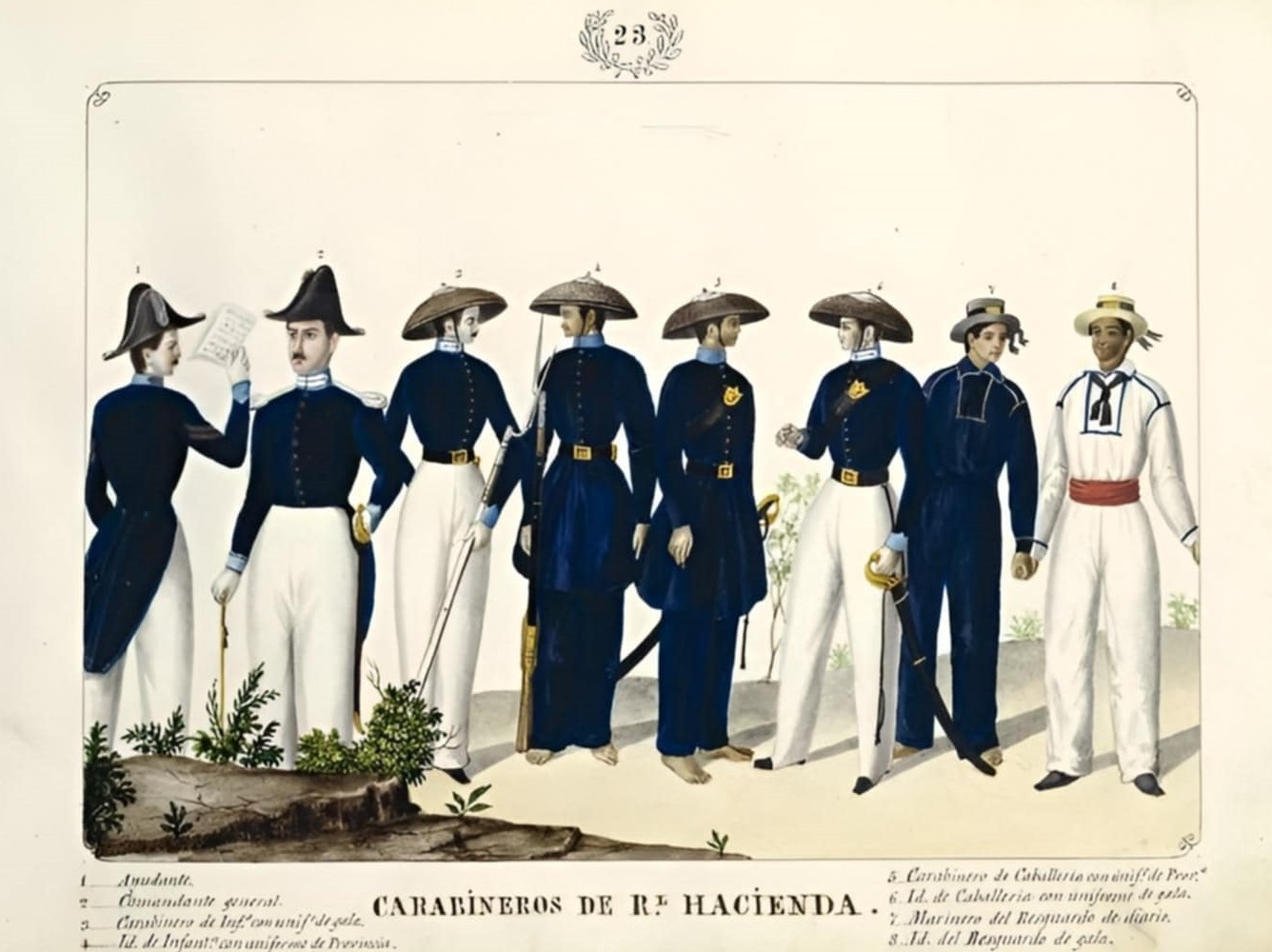
Carabiniers in the Philippines.

The Cuerpo de Carabineros de Seguridad Pública was established by the Captaincy General of the Philippines in 1842 to serve as the police force in the Spanish East Indies. Its role was eventually assumed by the Guardia Civil.

=== Spanish Civil War ===
The Carabineros Corps was one of the units of law enforcement where the 1936 Spanish coup of July 1936, which led to the Spanish Civil War, found the least support. With the regular army divided and the almost 50-50% split of the Civil Guard, the Republican government was heavily dependent on trained and properly equipped loyalist units such as the Carabineros and the Assault Guards to fight in the first crucial battles of the war. In mid-1936 there had been a total of about 16,096 men in the corps: 3 generals, 770 officers, 1,169 sub-officers and 14,154 Carabineros. Approximately a third were in the territories that fell to the rebel side (about 5–6,000 men) after the coup and the two-thirds that were in the areas controlled by the Republic (about 10,000) remained loyal to the established government.

As a professional force of generally proven loyalty to the Republic, the carabineros formed an elite unit, which was integrated into the mixed brigades of the Republican Army. The Carabinier corps was increased in strength to 40,000 men. The initiative for this restructuring was taken by the then Finance Minister Juan Negrín.

Numbers of loyalist carabineros taken prisoner by the Army of Africa in August 1936 were executed in Badajoz.

==== Mixed brigades ====
Certain units of the People's Republican Army were entirely made up of Carabineros, such as the 65th, 85th, 87th, 152nd, 179th, 211th, 222nd and 228th mixed brigades. The 3rd —the Tercera Brigada Mixta mentioned in the Si me quieres escribir song— and 5th were among the most distinguished mixed brigades of the loyalist army and saw action in most of the main battles of the civil war, including the Jarama, Brunete and the Teruel battles.

=== End of the war and disbandment ===
Following the Francoist victory in 1939 the Carabineros Corps was disbanded. This measure was taken by the new regime as a reprisal for the majority of the carabinier units having remained loyal to the Republic during the rising of 1936. A law was passed on 15 March 1940 by which the Spanish Dictatorship terminated the Cuerpo de Carabineros, transferring its remaining personnel and assets to the Guardia Civil. Article number 4 of the aforementioned law stated:

The present Inspectorate-General of the Carabineros is herewith removed. Its activities and functions will be taken over by a single section of the Directorate-General of the Civil Guard and all powers will be transferred to its General Director. The personnel of this corps will be assigned to the various services that will be defined by this law as exclusive to the Guardia Civil corps in the way that will be determined by its General Director according to the abilities and conditions of its personnel.

Nine years after the end of Franco's dictatorship the Spanish Law 37/1984 of 22 October 1984 recognized the rights and services of those who had been part of the Armed Forces, Police and Carabiniers of the Spanish Republic (Reconocimiento de derechos y servicios prestados a quienes durante la Guerra Civil formaron parte de las Fuerzas Armadas, Fuerzas de Orden Público y Cuerpo de Carabineros de la República). This law gave back to the surviving members of the corps some of the rights and recognition of which they had been deprived in 1940.
