= Aldo Morandi =

Aldo Morandi was the alias of Riccardo Formica (1896–1975), an Italian communist/antifascist.

In 1936, he was persuaded by the French Communist Party to enroll in the International Brigades of the Spanish Civil War and fight against the nationalist faction. On 30 November, he came to Spain and joined the Spanish Communist Party. After having been promoted to the degree of captain in Albacete, on 23 December Morandi became chief of staff of the XIV International Brigade, which was right away assigned in Andalusia. Arriving at the front of Madrid, on 14 February he was appointed commander of the 21st and 24th battalion involved in the Battle of Jarama, during which Morandi reported a thigh wound. Subsequently, he became the head of the 86th Mixed Brigade and 63rd Division deployed in Córdoba.
