= Andrés Saliquet =

Spanish military personnel (1877–1959)

Andrés Saliquet Zumeta
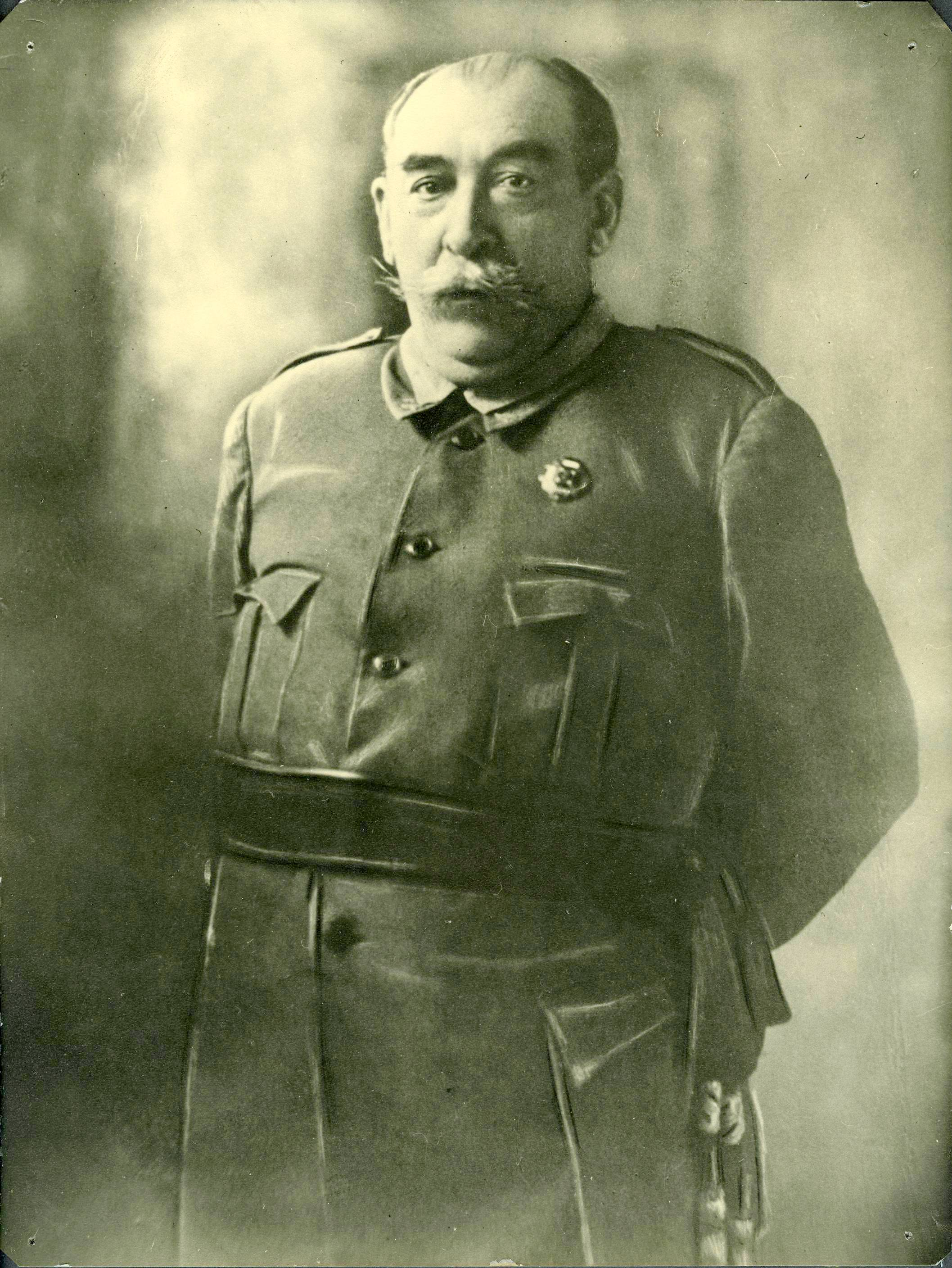
- Born: 21 March 1877; Barcelona, Spain
- Died: 23 June 1959 (aged 82); Madrid, Francoist Spain
- Burial place: Madrid, Spain
- Military career
- Allegiance: Kingdom of Spain; Nationalist Spain; Francoist Spain
- Conflicts: Spanish–American War; Rif War; Spanish Civil War

Andrés Saliquet Zumeta, Marquis of Saliquet (21 March 1877 – 23 June 1959) was a Spanish soldier who participated in the failed military coup against the Second Republic, which gave rise to the Spanish Civil War. During the war he took charge of the Army of the center, a unit that contained troops of the Nationalist faction from the Tagus River to Madrid, Guadarrama and the Universal Mountains.

== Early life and career ==
Saliquet entered the Toledo Infantry Academy on 29 August 1893, and graduated on 24 June 1895. Shortly afterward, he participated in the Cuban War of Independence and then in the Moroccan Wars in which he rapidly rose through the ranks. During the dictatorship of Primo de Rivera, he was appointed civil governor of Santander (1928). On 8 February 1930, he was appointed military governor of Cádiz.

In 1923, he was promoted to brigadier-general, and by 1929, he was major-general. After the proclamation of the Second Republic, the military government of Cádiz was dismissed.

== Spanish Civil War ==
He went into retirement with Azana's reforms but joined the conspiracy that had been organized by General Emilio Mola, who commissioned him to take command of the VII Organic Division. For that reason, on 19 July 1936, he forcibly deposed General Molero and proclaimed a state of war in the Province of Valladolid and took control of the VII Organic Division and all its dependent territories. For that reason, he was one of the soldiers that the Spanish government discharged from the army on 22 July 1936 to try to end the military rebellion. He was a member of the National Defense Board that is formed in Burgos, a kind of provisional government that initially governed the rebel zone. He was part of the group of generals who elected Francisco Franco as head of the government and as Generalissimo of the Armies. He continued to command the VII Division and later reconverted the unit into VII Army Corps.

On 4 June 1937, he was appointed commander-in-chief of the newly created Army of the center. The unit covered the front from the Alto Tajo to the Cáceres Front, passing through Guadarrama, the Madrid Front and Toledo. At the end of the war, in 1939, both he and his subordinate units participated in the Madrid Victory Parade. On 17 May, he was promoted to lieutenant-general.

Serrano Suñer described him as "a nice, honest, good-natured man, not infatuated, doggedly faithful to command."

== Francoist Spain ==
After the war ended, he was appointed, on 5 July, captain general of the I Military Region (Madrid). However, on 21 July, he was placed in charge of the II Military Region (Seville), replacing General Gonzalo Queipo de Llano. A month later, on 19 August, he was reappointed to command the captaincy general of Madrid. In May 1940, by virtue of a delegation of powers from the dictator, Saliquet became the main person in charge of the Francoist repression in the capital and signed hundreds of executions of death sentences dictated in summary war councils. In March 1941, he served as president of the Special Court for the Repression of Freemasonry and Communism, a position he would hold until his death.

During the military dictatorship, he was State Councilor and Attorney at the Cortes. Between 1945 and 1946, he held the presidency of the Supreme Council of Military Justice after his transfer to the reserve since he had reached the regulatory age. He was granted the Marquis of Saliquet by Franco.

== 2008 judicial indictment ==
In 2008, he was one of the 35 high-ranking officials of the Franco regime charged by the National High Court in the summary brought by Baltasar Garzón for the alleged crimes of illegal detention and crimes against humanity, which were allegedly committed during the Spanish Civil War and the early years of the Franco regime. The judge declared Saliquet's criminal responsibility to be extinguished when he received reliable evidence of his death, which had occurred almost 50 years earlier. The investigation of the case was so controversial that Garzón was accused of perverting the course of justice, which resulted in him being tried and acquitted by the Supreme Court.

== Awards ==
- The Military Medal, in 1940.
- Crosses of Military Merit, in 1943.
- Order of Isabella the Catholic, in 1944.

Predecessor: -	Capitán General of the I Military Region (Madrid) 5 - 21 July 1939	Successor: ??
Predecessor: Gonzalo Queipo de Llano	Capitán General of the II Military Region (Seville) 21 July - 19 August 1939	Successor: Fidel Dávila Arrondo
Predecessor: ??	Capitán General of the I Military Region (Madrid) 19 August 1939 - ??	Successor: ??
