= Spanish military conspiracy of 1936 =

1936 military plot

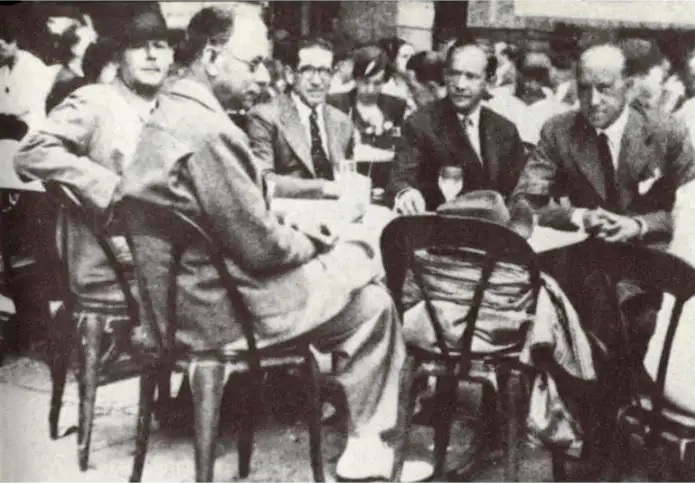
Photograph of conspirators during a meeting, Pamplona, early July 1936. The conspiracy leader Emilio Mola is in the foreground.

The Spanish military conspiracy of 1936 was a plot developed within the Spanish army from March to July 1936. It commenced shortly after the Popular Front government assumed power. Initially, it was barely more than an informal group of Madrid-based generals, who agreed to monitor political developments, and be ready to intervene in case of a breakdown of state structures and a forthcoming proletarian revolution. Over time, conspirators assumed that military action was inevitable, and started to prepare for a coup. Its political objectives were not clear, but its most important one was toppling the Popular Front government, leading to major rectifications of the republican regime towards some sort of corporative state. The conspiracy network grew to hundreds of officers in most Spanish garrisons. The person who agreed to lead the future coup was the exiled general José Sanjurjo. His representative in Spain was initially general Ángel Rodríguez del Barrio, but since late May, this role was assumed by general Emilio Mola, who emerged as the de facto leader of the conspiracy. Some right-wing politicians were given vague information, but they were neither told any details nor admitted to the decision-making process. The government was aware of the plot unfolding, but since there was only circumstantial evidence in hand, they opted not to launch a pre-emptive strike, and to instead wait for the plotters to come out. The conspiracy climaxed in a coup, which began on July 17, 1936, and which effectively commenced the Spanish Civil War.

== Background ==
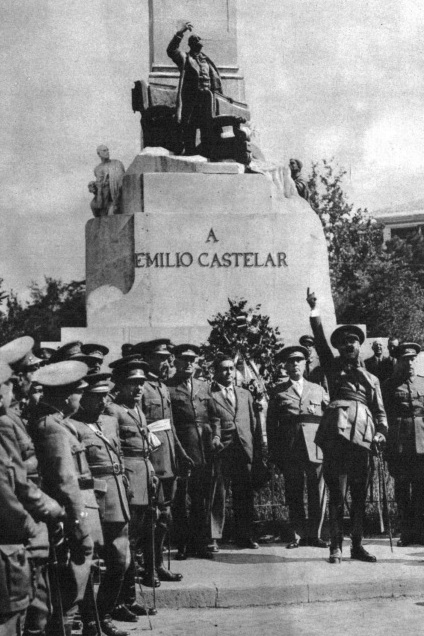
Queipo de Llano hailing the Republic, 1931

Throughout most of the 19th century the army acted as an arbiter in political conflicts, with a decisive role in coups, risings and civil wars. The beginning of the Restoration regime, established in the mid-1870s, commenced a period of stabilization, with the military driven out of politics. However, since the early 20th century, the system was decreasingly capable of dealing with new challenges, and the voice of the army was beginning to be heard again. The 1923 coup of general Miguel Primo de Rivera was praetorian in character; the 6-year-long military dictatorship successfully tackled key immediate problems, but it failed to re-define the regime. Primo acknowledged defeat and stepped down in 1930, but no new solution within the format of liberal democracy has been found and the monarchy collapsed in 1931.

The military greeted the advent of the Republic with little enthusiasm, but no particular hostility. The officer corps was generally monarchist rather than republican and conservative rather than progressive, but following last years of Primo dictatorship, which had compromised and discredited the army, most military men preferred to stay clear of politics. It was only when the new regime started to target the army for serious reform that voices of dissent started to be heard. A series of reforms, introduced since 1931, were aimed at scaling down the overgrown officer corps, structural reform, and bringing the armed forces firmly under the civilian control. This proved to make way for the growth of corporative disenchantment and for loose conspiracy by a minor fraction of the officer corps, which produced the politically vague 1932 coup known as Sanjurjada, defeated easily in about 24 hours.

In 1933-1935 the army did not play a protagonist role in politics, except that in October 1934 it was engaged in defending the constitutional republican regime against a localized revolution staged by Anarchist, Socialist and Catalanist groupings; combat involved much bloodshed and massive repression followed. It was mostly individual military men – usually retired or without assignment – that took part in anti-Republican plots engineered by some right-wing political movements, especially the Carlists. A semi-official structure, Unión Militar Española, emerged in the early 1930s and grouped a minoritarian, yet significant group of officers, especially at junior and mid-rank positions; it was flavored by right-wing sympathies but initially it did not assume a clearly anti-Republican format, and it remained as sort of a corporative organization.

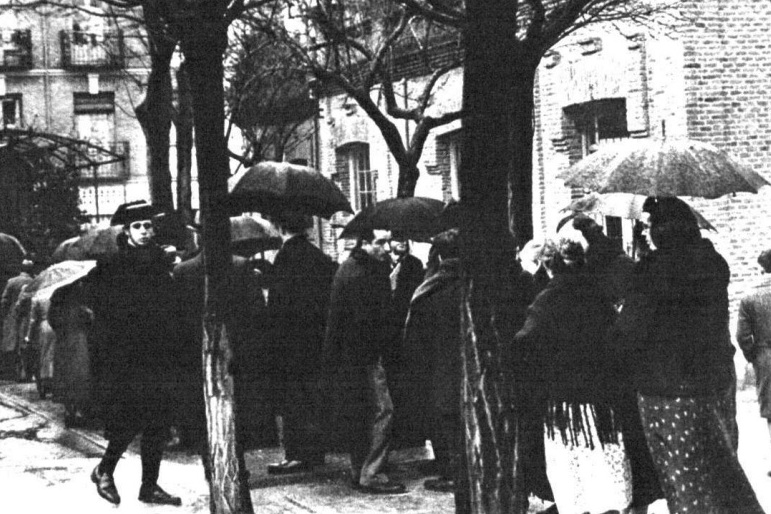
People wait in line in the rain to cast votes, Madrid, February 16.

General elections of February 1936 produced the triumph of Popular Front, the alliance partially composed of parties which organized the 1934 revolution and the one which placed amnesty to the revolutionaries as the key point of its program. On election night, triumphant celebrations in many cities turned into riots and produced numerous assaults on town halls and prison. A few highly-positioned officers suggested that the government introduce state of war, which some scholars consider the first, unsuccessful attempt of a military coup. The new Popular Front government embarked on radical left-wing policy and declared amnesty; suspicious about the army, it replaced most of the command layer with trusted officers. Politically-motivated street violence kept growing, soon to approach breakdown of public order. In early March legal action was launched against some officers who had fought the 1934 revolution, while radical parties demanded that all state functionaries involved in repressing the 1934 rebels be subject to juridical proceedings.

== Development ==
=== Generals' Junta (early March – late April) ===
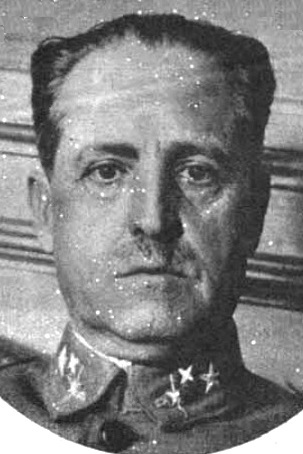
Rodriguez del Barrio

On March 8 a group of generals – later to be named Junta de Generales by some historians - met in Madrid and formed the first nucleus of the conspiracy. According to the official ministerial list, the most senior officer was 1) Rodriguez del Barrio, followed by 2) Villegas, 3) Saliquet, 4) González Carrasco, 5) Franco, 6) Fanjul (division generals), 7) Orgaz, and 8) Mola (brigadiers). Some generals (especially Goded, after del Barrio, the second highest-ranking conspirator and by some historians considered "el principal inspirador de la conspiración militar") were absent, though aware and supportive. Among those present only Franco and Mola commanded troops (or rather were appointed to command, yet to assume their new duties); the remaining ones held administrative roles or remained at ministerial disposal. The generals did not initially plan to stage a coup; instead, they agreed to watch political developments closely and get ready for intervention in case of total breakdown of public order, dissolution of Guardia Civil, release of all conscripts, or armed rising on part of the Left. They also agreed that the leading role should be entrusted to general Sanjurjo, at the time on exile in Portugal, with del Barrio acting as his representative. Soon afterwards Franco left for Canary Islands and Mola for Navarre, while other participants remained in Madrid. Unión Militar Española structures were taken advantage of as communication channels, especially that colonel Galarza, the co-founder of UME, also took part in the meeting.

Some time in mid-March, Sanjurjo, who was in touch with conspirators by means of emissaries and encrypted postal correspondence, accepted the leadership role, with del Barrio as the one "quien me gusta más" and Varela as "la mejor cabeza y el único intelligente". Development of the conspiracy network is unclear; it was mostly a Madrid-based enterprise and sketchy plans, in place by late March, were also centered on Madrid. At the time the plotters did not consider the situation in Spain detrimental enough to warrant a coup and preferred to simply wait in standby. This irritated Sanjurjo, who from his Portuguese exile pushed for immediate action; he developed doubts about what he considered an indecisive stand of the Madrid conspirators and as a measure of encouragement pledged to move to Spain the same moment the coup is declared. A review, performed by the plotters and dated early April, listed Morocco, Valladolid, Burgos, Pamplona, Vitoria and Zaragoza garrisons as firmly adhering to conspiracy, with Madrid unclear and Barcelona highly doubtful; first personal suggestions, later largely to be changed, were offered.

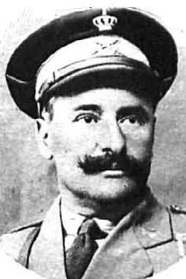
González Carrasco

In early April the president Alcalá-Zamora was deposed. Some conspirators thought it a first step towards revolutionaries taking over power; Galarza asked Alcalá not to step down and offered military support, but it is not clear whether he represented other plotters. Others remained skeptical, e.g. on April 12 Franco sent a dilatory note. On April 14 celebrations of the anniversary of the Republic turned into riots and a respected right-wing Guardia Civil commander was killed; his funeral two days later turned into a large anti-governmental demonstration. This has probably prompted the conspirators to act. On April 17 Rodríguez del Barrio, González Carrasco, Varela and Orgaz set April 20 as the date of the rising. Its details remain rather obscure, apart that Varela was to seize the Ministry of War and Orgaz to lead sub-units taking control of Capitania General. However, at least some of those involved had second thoughts, as they were well aware of rather sketchy and improvised nature of the scheme. On April 18 del Barrio claimed health problems – at the time his cancer was well advanced – and withdrew. The coup was cancelled in the last minute.

=== Realignment (late April – late May) ===
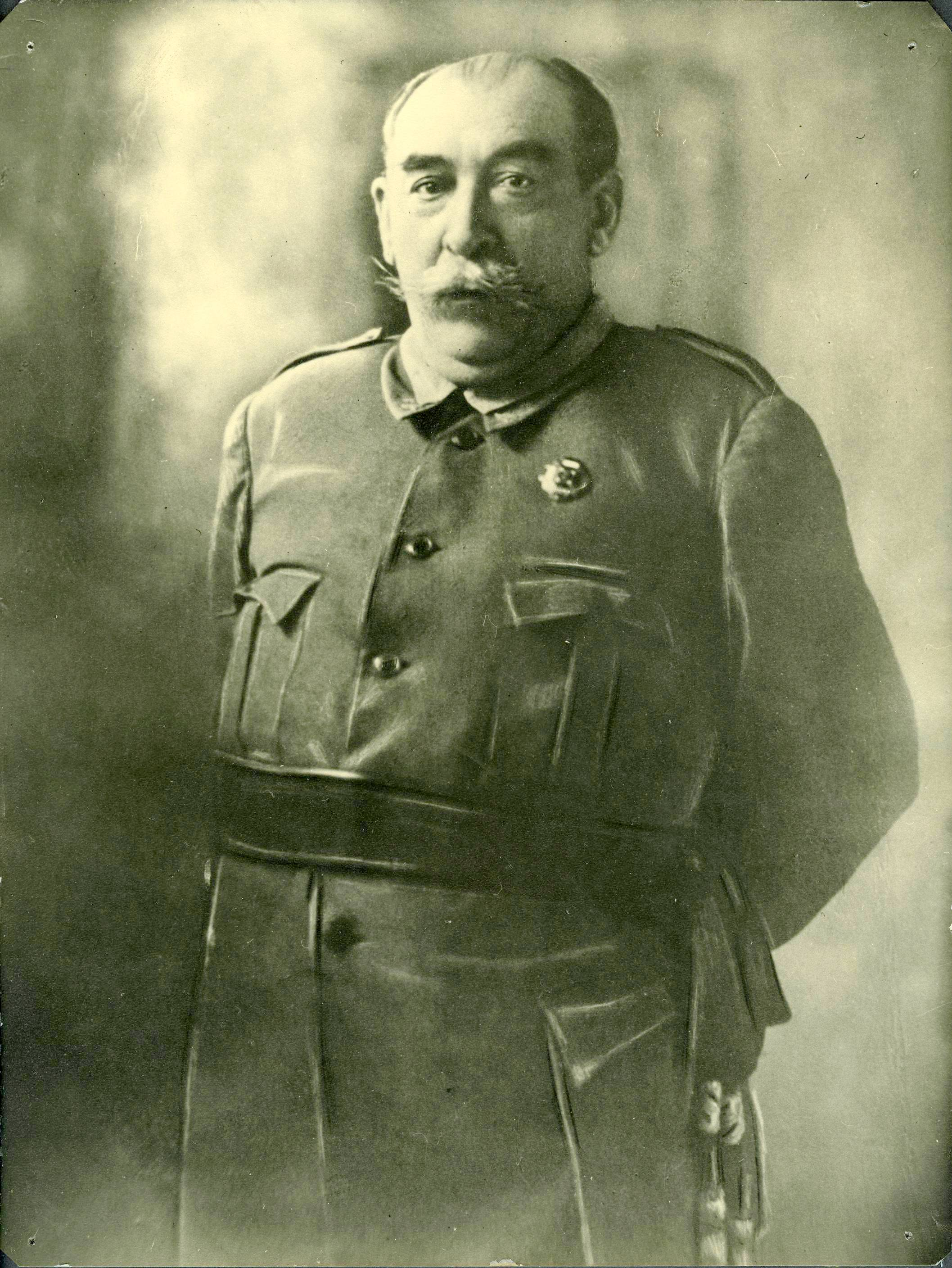
Saliquet

Preparations to the April 20 coup exposed some of the conspirators, as state services were able at least to identify key suspects, e.g. security got hold of a list with members of the future governing Junta. Many were either (like Orgaz) transferred to minor peripheral positions or (like Saliquet) moved to the "disponibles forzosos" category, in service but with no assignement. The transfers weakened the plot, especially in Madrid, yet neither a disciplinary nor legal action has been taken. Cancellation of the April 20 coup produced much frustration among some mid-level officers, disillusioned about dithering and wavering on part of key plotters. In late April some Madrid conspirators informed Sanujro that "all is lost". At the time the conspiracy appeared to have been at its lowest point. Sanjurjo estimated that Varela, under constant surveillance in Cádiz, had no means to act, while Mola in Pamplona did have room for maneuvering, but remained vacillating.

On April 19, following cancellation of the coup, mid-rank UME officers from some garrisons of the VI. Military Region (Burgos, Pamplona, Logroño) staged a meeting. Disappointment as to indecision of the Madrid conspirators was running high, and these present decided that an alternative path should be taken. They focused on Mola, who for some 5 weeks had been cautiously tying the knots of local conspiracy in Pamplona; the officers suggested that he takes the initiative, which he apparently agreed to do. Few days later, on April 25, Mola issued and sent to fellow conspirators a document named Instrucción reservada no. 1; it laid out basic rules for organisation of the coup on the local level. It is not clear whether the document was a proposal or rather an instruction, as at the time the author was merely one of a few senior generals behind the plot and by no means an agreed leader, which he would become few weeks later.

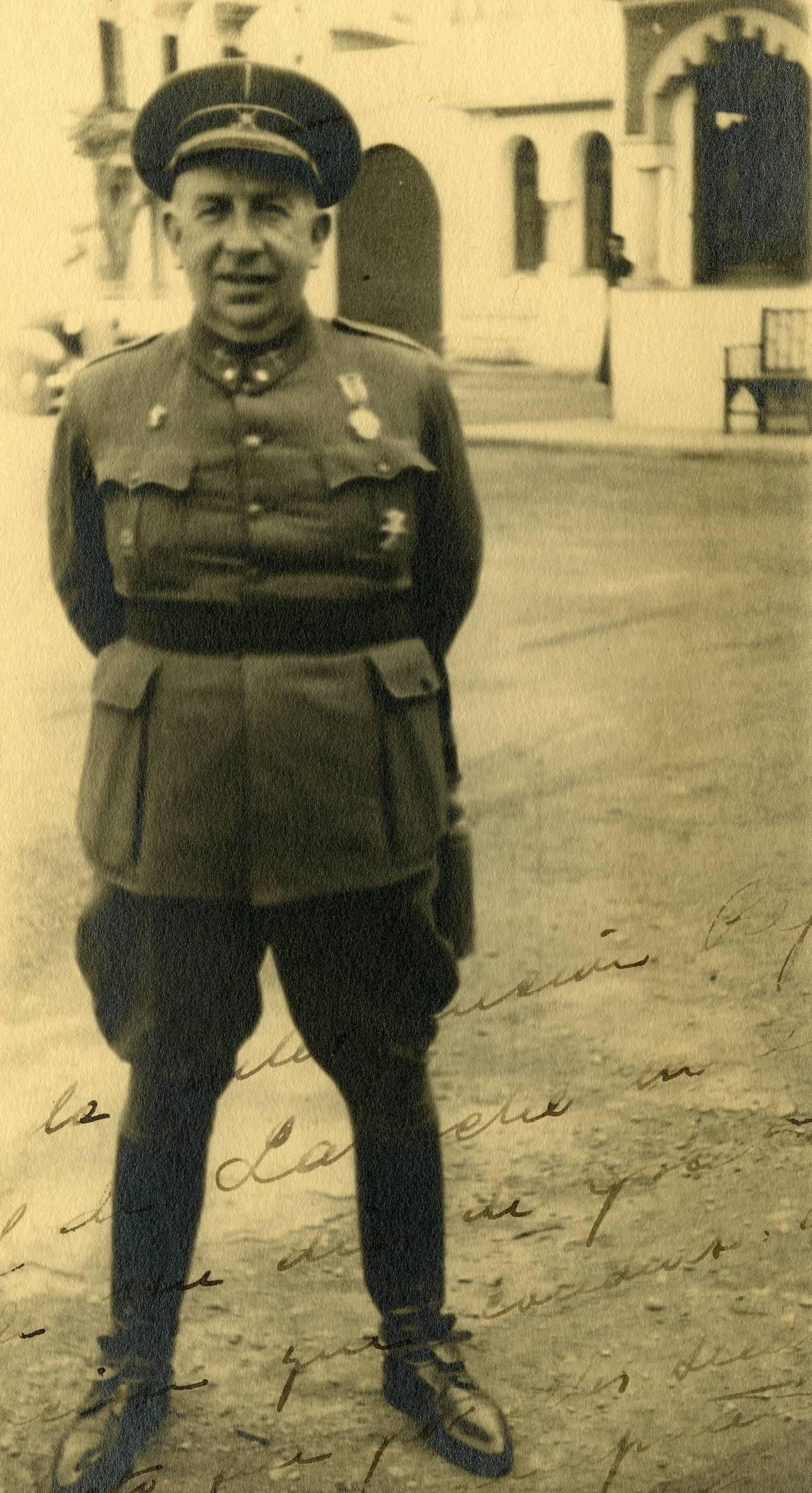
Orgaz

The Madrid conspirators unexpectedly devised another scheme. On May 8 Fanjul, García de la Herrán, Carrasco, Orgaz, Ponte, Saliquet and Villegas decided to act 3 days later. The newly elected president, Manuel Azaña, was to take the oath in the Cortes; a presidential battalion, supposedly controlled by rebels, was to detain all Popular Front politicians during the ceremony, while an artillery detachment was to serve as backup with some civilians from Falange and Comunión Tradicionalista also taking part. Little is known of this plan, including to what extent the scheme went beyond a mere idea and what preparations have been actually taken; eventually on May 11 nothing happened. It seems that the episode has furtherly compromised conspirators from Junta de Generales.

A manuscript note found in Sanjurjo's papers and dated May 15 claimed that the unique option left was "elementos civiles de Navarra, y Mola". In the second half of May the correspondence between Mola and Sanjurjo was in full swing and some sort of agreement between the two was being forged. On May 25 Mola issued two more documents, Instrucción Reservada No. 2, and El objetivo, los medios y los itinerarios; for the first time they outlined a plan of rebel units converging upon Madrid. On May 29 Sanjurjo declared that his representative in Spain would be Mola, who hence replaced Rodríguez del Barrio at this role. By that time to most conspirators it became clear that the coup was not – as originally agreed in early March – an option, to be acted upon or not depending on developments, but a firm objective.

=== Plan sealed (late May – late June) ===
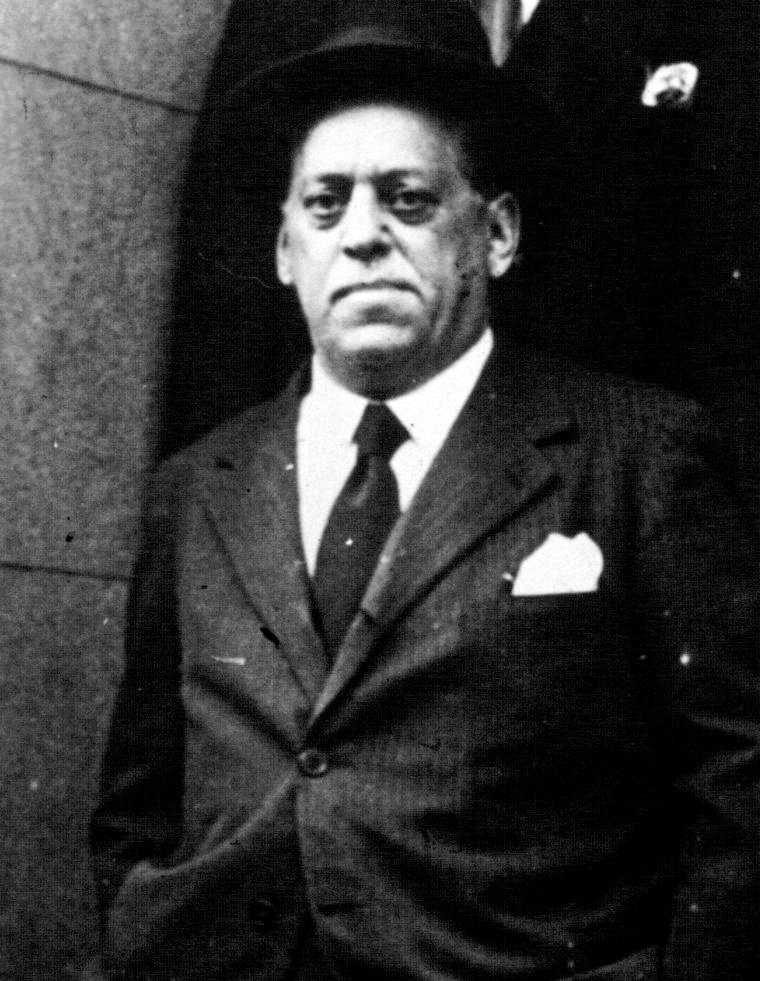
Sanjurjo

Since mid-May the centre of gravity of the conspiracy clearly moved from Madrid to Pamplona, and "a broader network of conspiracy began to form". On May 31 Mola issued Directiva para la V División and Directiva para la VII División, fairly detailed instructions for Zaragoza and Valladolid military regions. It seems that at the time he was already the key brain behind the conspiracy, acting on behalf of Sanjurjo and de facto assuming the role of the rebel chief of staff. His documents demonstrate that he reversed the centrifugal plan, produced by Junta de Generales, and kept developing details of a centripetal scheme. Thanks to a warning from conspirators in state security structures Mola managed to outsmart director general de Seguridad, who on June 3 showed up in Pamplona but found no compromising evidence.

On June 5 Mola issued further documents and instructions, Instrucción Reservada No. 4 (Instrucción Reservada No. 3 – if issued – has never been found), and El Directorio y su obra inicial; the latter referred to political, not military issues, and provided outline for governance scheme after the successful coup. On June 8 he reached sort of understanding with Miguel Cabanellas, the highest-ranking general who would get involved in the plot and the only one who commanded one of Spain's 8 military regions. Throughout June the military conspirators reached out to politicians, though with the intention to keep them at arms' length and to avoid any political commitments on part of the army. Gil-Robles and Calvo Sotelo were merely provided vague information about the unfolding plot. Most detailed talks took place with the Carlists: in mid-June Mola twice met their men, including the party leader Fal Conde, but talks about military co-operation were wrecked by political differences. Loose negotiations were held with the Falangists, which only by the end of the month would produce conditional and restricted adhesion on part of Primo de Rivera.

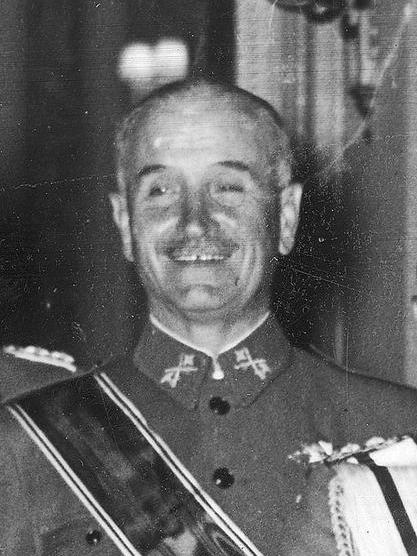
Queipo

Until mid-June numerous military issues remained far from solved; the Pamplona-based Mola complained that even in the neighboring San Sebastián "there are conspirators, but there is no conspiracy" with no command layer appointed. Franco remained undecided and on June 23 he sent a highly ambiguous letter to the prime minister Casares. Only in the second decade of June it was agreed with Queipo de Llano that he would lead the coup in II. Región Militar (Seville), while appointments in the VIII. Región (La Coruña) remained pending until the actual coup commenced. Instrucción Reservada No. 5 and Instrucciones sobre Bases Navales were issued on June 20. The plan was getting increasingly complex. Directiva para Marruecos (June 24) and Instrucciones para el desarrollo de la Directiva relativa a Marruecos (June 30) specified the role of the African troops, which under provisional command, perhaps this of Yagüe (who during one-to-one meeting of June 12 assured Casares of his loyalty) were for the first time instructed to cross the Strait of Gibraltar, disembark in Andalusia and proceed towards Madrid. Sanjurjo might not have been aware of all details of the scheme, yet he had full trust in Mola and his plan.

=== Final decisions (late June – mid-July) ===
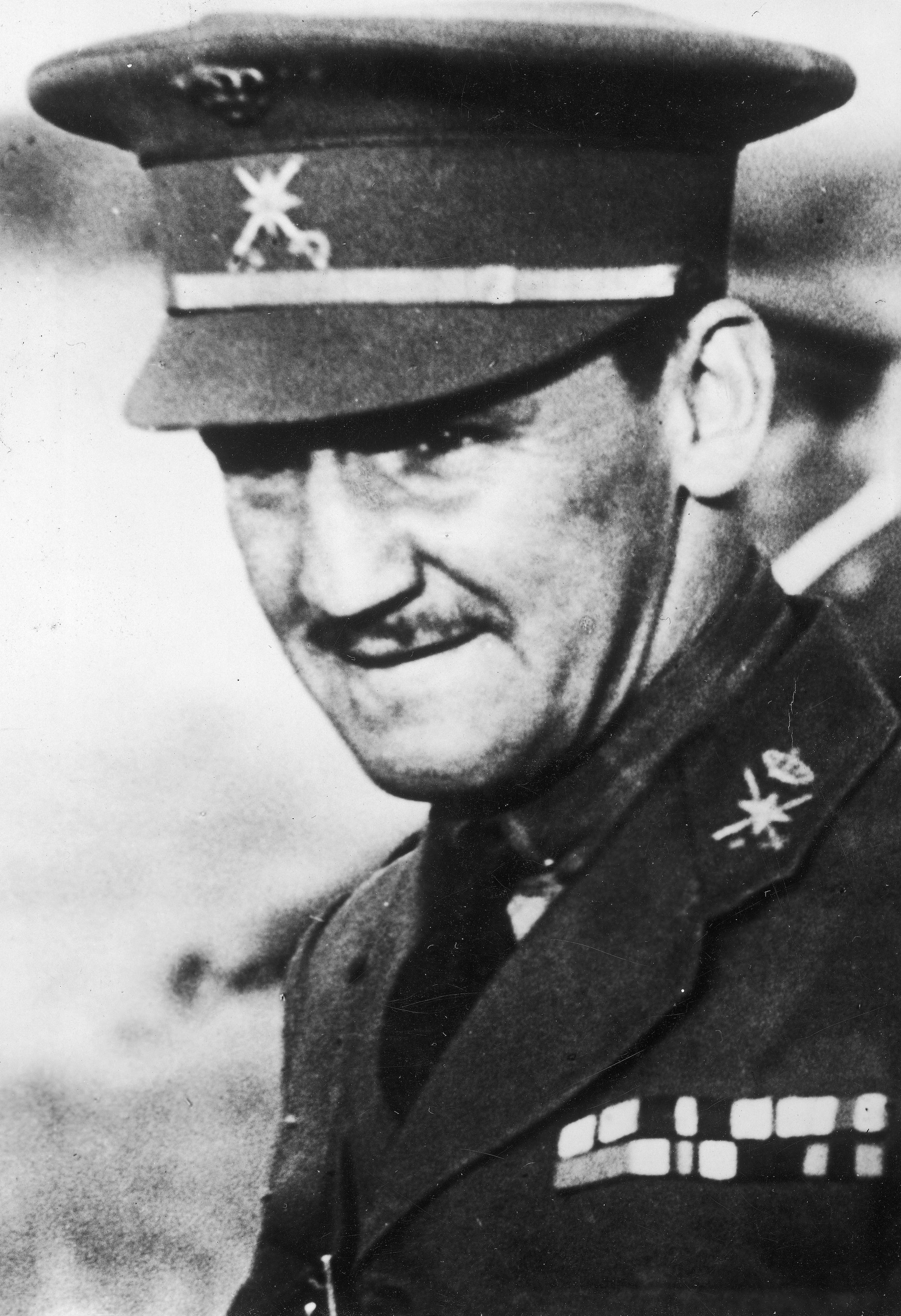
Goded

On July 1 a Renovación Española politician Sainz Rodríguez signed a contract with an Italian company; it featured purchase of 40 aircraft, fuel, machine guns and ammunition. One historian speculates that the deal was possibly inspired by military conspirators. According to some scholars probably some time in early July Mola set the date of the coup at July 10, yet for unclear reasons reportedly the rising has been called off. In early July Mola kept issuing further directivas; he also made last-minute changes to command posts, e.g. González Carrasco was re-appointed from Barcelona to Valencia. Though on July 11 a specially arranged plane supposed to take Franco from Canary Islands to Morocco took off from London, on basis of Franco's skeptical statements Mola did not assign him any role in the coup. At that point he still harbored grave doubts, and intransigence of the Carlists brought him close to desperation; he reportedly considered even abandoning the conspiracy altogether.

On July 12 no date for a rising has been set; it is unclear whether a decision to rise has been taken at all, though some authors claim it was firmly planned for the second half of July. Some men in conspiracy command, especially Sanjurjo, Mola and Goded, were determined to act and from their perspective, the rising was a matter of time. This opinion was shared by many mid-range and junior officers. However, probably much larger sections of military men aware or marginally involved still harbored doubts. It was so either because they were concerned about insufficiently developed conspiracy, or because they did not consider the situation in the country bad enough and hoped for radical left-wing fervour to fizzle out, or because they retained a sense of loyalty to the regime, or simply because they feared consequences of failure, especially in terms of their personal lot and this of their families. Estimates as to the number of determined conspirators differ widely; to some it was "no more than 1,000", or not more than 12% of all officers, to others "less than 200"; conspiracy existed at least in 44 of 51 army garrisons.

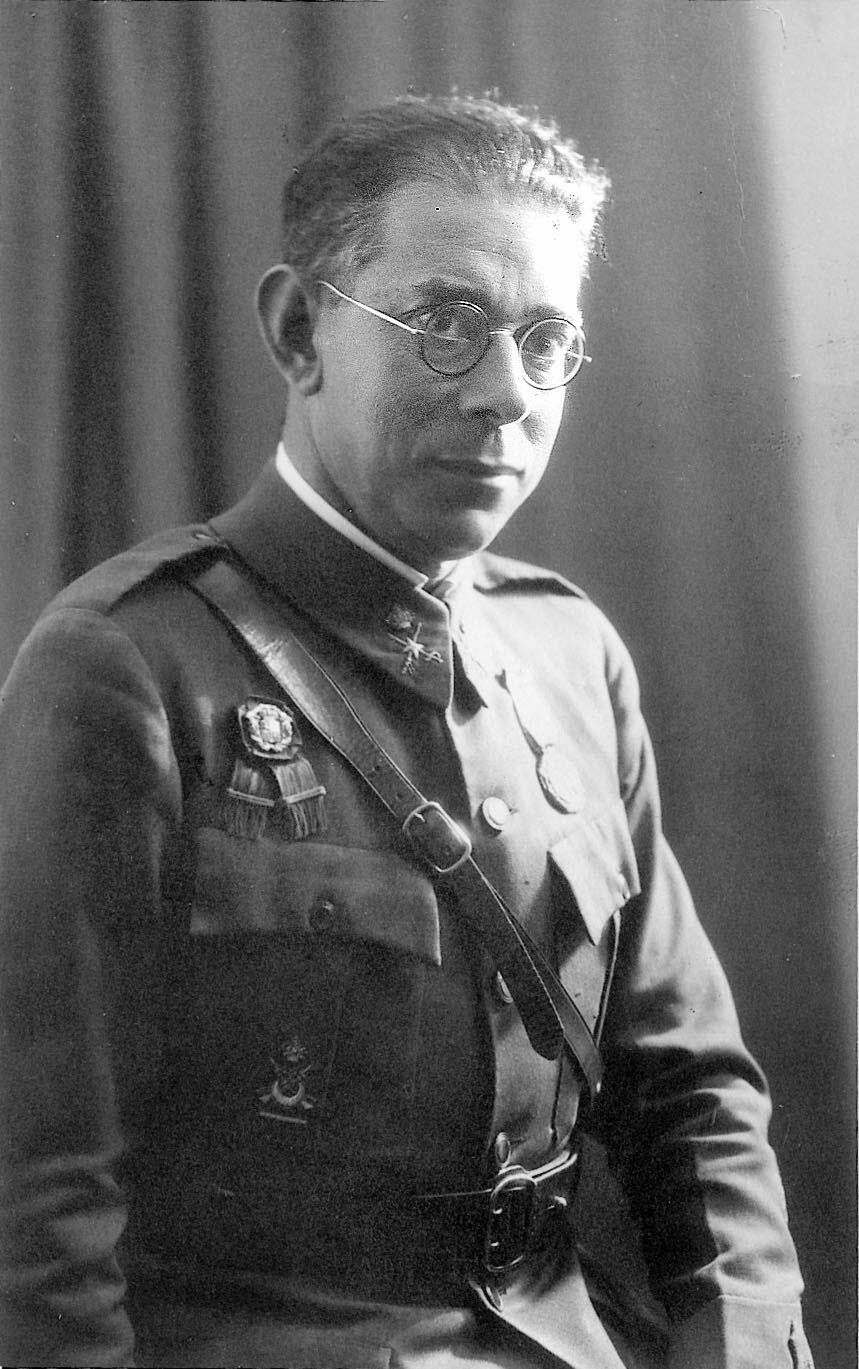
Mola

Early on July 13, Calvo Sotelo was shot; the killing sent shock-waves across the country. It had also crucial impact in case of numerous officers, who so far remained ambiguous. Many concluded that revolution was now under way and that not joining became more dangerous than joining the conspiracy. On July 13 Franco wired his access to Mola and was immediately nominated head of the troops supposed to rise in Morocco. On July 14 Mola sent his last instructions. The same day he eventually closed the deal with the Carlists, who on basis of vague assurances from Sanjurjo committed their requeté militia. On July 14-15 Mola issued the orders to rise; most peninsular garrisons were to commence rebellion on July 19, Andalusia and Morocco 24-48 hours earlier. On July 16 Madrid-based officers supposed to lead the coup elsewhere departed to their destinations. An aircraft was arranged to fly from France to Portugal on July 17 and to bring Sanjurjo to Burgos two days later.

== Governmental response ==
=== Personalities ===
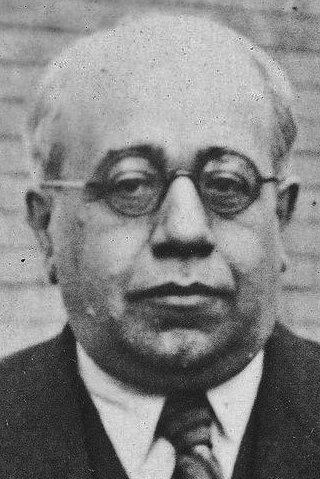
Azaña

During the period from February elections to the July coup there were 2 prime ministers in office: Azaña until mid-May and Casares Quiroga afterwards. In the government of Azaña the minister of interior was Amós Salvador, a 57-year-old Izquierda Republicana politician and architect by trade. He had no experience as administrator and was nominated largely because of his personal friendship with Azaña and his brother-in-law. Historians present him as "otra mediocridad" and an "inept, if not entirely incompetent" minister, generally lacking energy and determination, but at times carried away by his republican zeal up to the point of irresponsibility. Casares Quiroga replaced Salvador as caretaker in mid-April, and later as prime minister he also temporarily assumed the Interior. However, soon he nominated Juan Moles, a 67-year-old independent Catalanist republican with some experience as the mayor of Barcelona, alto comisario in Morocco, and briefly the Generalitat president; neither he had any record in security and demonstrated little competence as head of Interior, in historiography also dubbed as "el irresponsable". Their deputies were respectively Juan José Cremades, a 35-year-old IR lawyer who failed to make it to history books, and Bibiano Osorio Tafal, a 34-year-old biology scholar of radical views who got the job as Casares' fellow member of the ORGA.

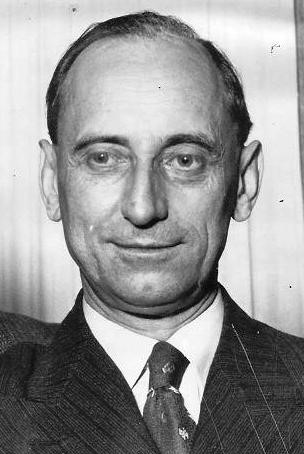
Casares Quiroga

The key man in republican structures responsible for security issues was José Alonso Mallol, a 42-year-old lawyer and former member of PRRS who in the early 1930s briefly served as civil governor. Salvador nominated him head of Dirección General de Seguridad, the public order branch of the Interior, and later Moles confirmed him on this position. Historiographic opinions on Mallol differ; to some he "had worked tirelessly to combat Falangist terrorism and to monitor the activities of hostile officers", to some he also lacked competence in security matters and was "no demasiado eficiente", especially that he failed to find that some of his subordinates, like a high DGS functionary Santiago Martín Báguenas, were members of the conspiracy. Guardia Civil, the key policing formation of the country, was led by brigade general Sebastián Pozas Perea, while Guardia de Asalto, formatted as sort of republican guard, was headed by teniente coronel Pedro Sanchez Plaza; both were fervent republicans. The Minister of War was initially division general Carlos Masquelet, of moderate left-republican sympathies; Casares had little faith in him and in May he took over the ministry himself. Throughout all the period between February elections and the July coup the army chief of staff was division general José Sánchez-Ocaña, a cautious military who did not demonstrate any political preferences.

=== April to July ===
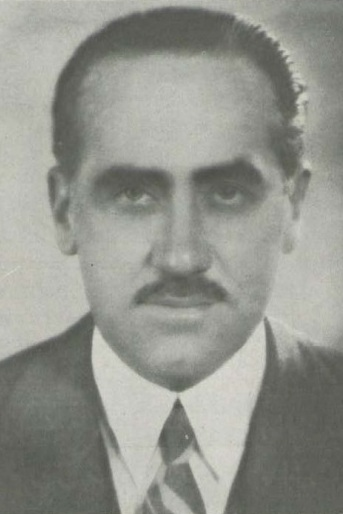
Salvador

Governmental response to military conspiracy was rather cautious. State security gathered some circumstantial evidence in wake of the called-off coup of April 20, but neither legal nor disciplinary action has been taken. Generals suspected of mischief were moved within the military structures; Rodríguez del Barrio was dismissed as inspector general; Villegas, Saliquet, González Carrasco and Fanjul were moved to the "disponibles forzosos" category, Orgaz was sent to the Canary Islands and Varela to Cádiz. In May a successful action of security services unearthed hundreds of fake Guardia Civil uniforms in Madrid, but this was part of an independent Carlist scheme, only loosely related to military conspiracy. Later in May Mallol presented Casares and Azaña with a list of 500 conspirators whom he believed should be arrested immediately, but the two did not act. Once informers started pointing to Mola, in early June Mallol raided Pamplona with DGS men, but they failed to find any firm evidence and counter-action was limited to detentions of secondary figures, like colonel Utrilla. However, alarming news kept coming: information about unusual officers' meetings in the barracks, discovery of non-evidenced firearms stocks, identification of strange arrangements in arms factories, cryptic conversations on tapped phone lines, UMRA warnings related to specific commanders, and intercepted written messages. On June 28 Mallol was in Pamplona again, but this time he spoke only to the civil governor, Menor Poblador.

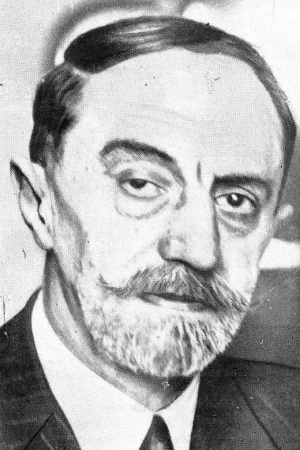
Moles

In early July Moles got hold of some of Mola's instrucciones; they revealed part of the plan, but no personalities, and security remained unsure who the "El Director", signining the documents, was. During the cabinet meeting of July 10 the prime minister informed those present that a military conspiracy was unfolding. Two options were considered: A) to mount a pre-emptive strike and risk judiciary proceedings of unclear outcome, or B) to get prepared, monitor developments and let conspirators come out. It was decided to opt for the latter. Apart from usual surveillance, extra measures involved 1) transferring suspected officers to minor, possibly peripheral positions; 2) high-level vigilant regime in garrisons (including checks of premises, monitoring personal moves, restricted furlough policy, controlling telephone calls etc); 3) personal interviews of superiors with these subordinates who remained under suspicion; 4) staging meetings and asking the officers gathered to swear allegiance to the Republic; 5) detentions of secondary figures; 6) maintaining links with UMRA officers, who on their own were monitoring situation in their barracks; 7) restrictions on some type of manoeuvres. The last-minute success of security services was registered in Burgos on July 17 mid-day; during stopover they intercepted an aircraft, on its way from France to Portugal. The aircraft was supposed to bring Sanjurjo to rebel Burgos two days later, yet this is what security failed to find out.

=== Analysis ===
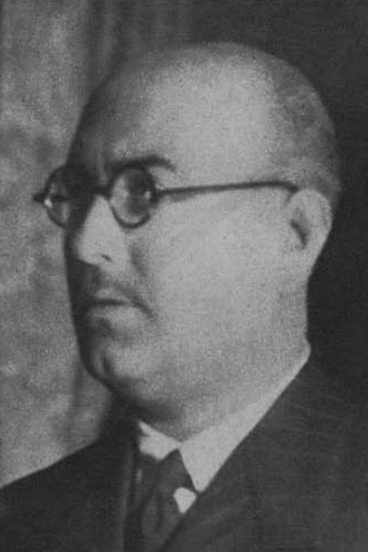
Mallol

Historians list 4 reasons as to why the government has not taken a decisive, bold action. The one mentioned most often is that key republican leaders, especially Azaña and Casares, were increasingly anxious about radicalisation of the workers' parties. Though theoretically alliance partners within Popular Front, politicians from left-republican parties started to feel like hostages of PSOE and PCE. They reportedly feared that continuous street violence approaching breakdown of public order, countless strikes with exorbitant economic and political demands, takeover of estates in rural areas, demands about reform of judicial system or dissolution of Guardia Civil indicated that revolution might be behind the corner, and were looking to army as the only force capable of preventing it. Hence, they preferred to pursue a conciliatory politics in order not to alienate the military. According to some sources Azaña, caught between a rock and a hard place, feared revolution more than a military coup.

Another reason for cautious action is lack of firm evidence against the suspects. The government was allegedly concerned that mounting a pre-emptive strike might be only partially effective and lead to further trouble. First, in such case it was obvious that only some of the plotters could be identified and targeted, while the other ones would remain on their positions; the conspiracy ring would be broken, but not entirely dismantled. Second, launching disciplinary and legal action on basis of circumstantial evidence might have ended in judicial stalemate. Unlike in case of anonymous right-wingers detained on the street, in case of well-known generals the possible outcome might be no firm sentences, protracted court proceedings and numerous acquittals.

One more reason is that republican politicians did not have Spanish military in high regard, and considered them mostly inept, mediocre and incompetent; within this perspective, officers formed a closed social caste which cared mostly about their salaries or, at best, women. Total failure of the 1932 coup confirmed these opinions and led many to believe that whatever was brewing, it would most likely end up as another pathetic, poorly organized Sanjurjada. Also, the government was probably aware that most officers were unwilling to take chances and engage in any adventure of unknown result, which might possibly affect their pensions and their families. Last but not least, republican politicians might have overestimated the result of Azaña's reforms of 1931-1933, meant to "republicanize" the army, and the role of left-wing commanders.

Some explanations are highly personalist. First, it might be pointed out that key politicians were not up to the task (tuberculosis-affected Casares, disoriented Azaña, incompetent Interior officials like Moles or Mallol). Second, it is noted that some key conspirators were considered genuine and loyal republicans, be it Cabanellas (freemason and former PRR deputy), Queipo de Llano (with family relations to Alcalá-Zamora, also conspirator against monarchy, who implemented the new order with such a zeal that he gained hatred of some of his fellow-officers) and Mola (personally respected by Casares, whom he helped during incarceration in last days of the monarchy). Some thought Franco a reasonable and loyal general. Even Yagüe during eye to eye conversation convinced the prime minister that he was a disciplined officer who would never engage in any unhonorable adventure.

== Military plan ==
=== Formulation ===
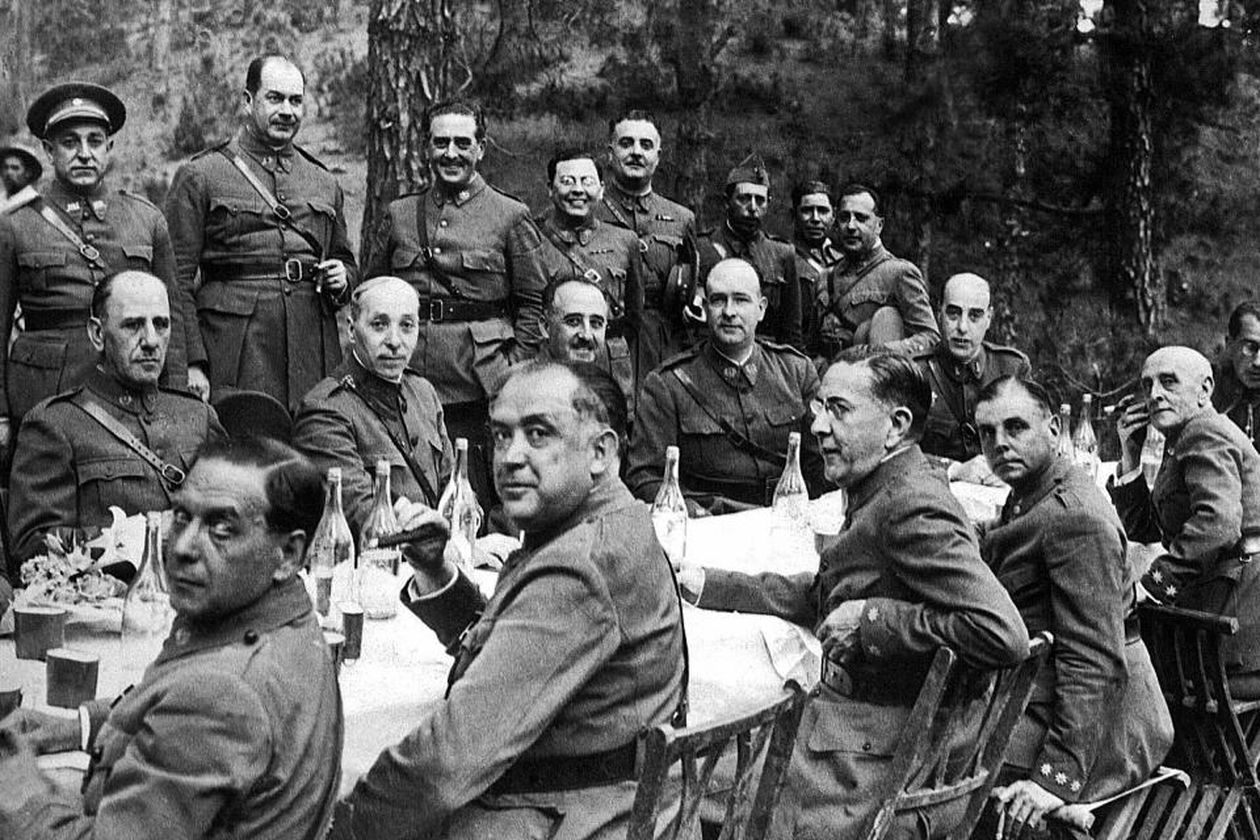
officers on manoeuvres (1936)

The insurgency plan is generally attributed to general Mola, who worked out its key parts. It is not clear to what extent it has been discussed within the conspiracy, though it is assumed that some features were at least consulted with others plotters and in some cases, especially Madrid, details were worked out by local conspirators. There has never been an overall, comprehensive, all-including single document prepared as a plan. Instead, the scheme was specified in a series of general documents, known as "instrucciones reservadas" or "informes reservadas", and in documents intended for specific divisions or army branches, known as "directivas"; they were issued by Mola between April 25 and July 14. It is not clear whether all such documents are known; e.g. there are specific "directivas" found for the 5. Division (Zaragoza) and the 7. Division (Valladolid), but no "directiva" for the 6. Division (Burgos) has ever been identified. It also seems that the plan evolved over time, e.g. in the document dated May 25. Mola expected the 2. Division (Seville) merely to maintain "benevolent neutrality", yet in the document dated June 24. he envisioned that insurgent troops would proceed from western Andalusia towards Madrid. There might have been also other, shorter pieces exchanged, apart from verbal instructions given during one-to-one meetings or delivered via emissaries. It is not known what the level of granularity was; the centrally designed plan might have included specifics for every province, but unclear whether it went below this level to other minor cities or garrisons.

=== General concept ===
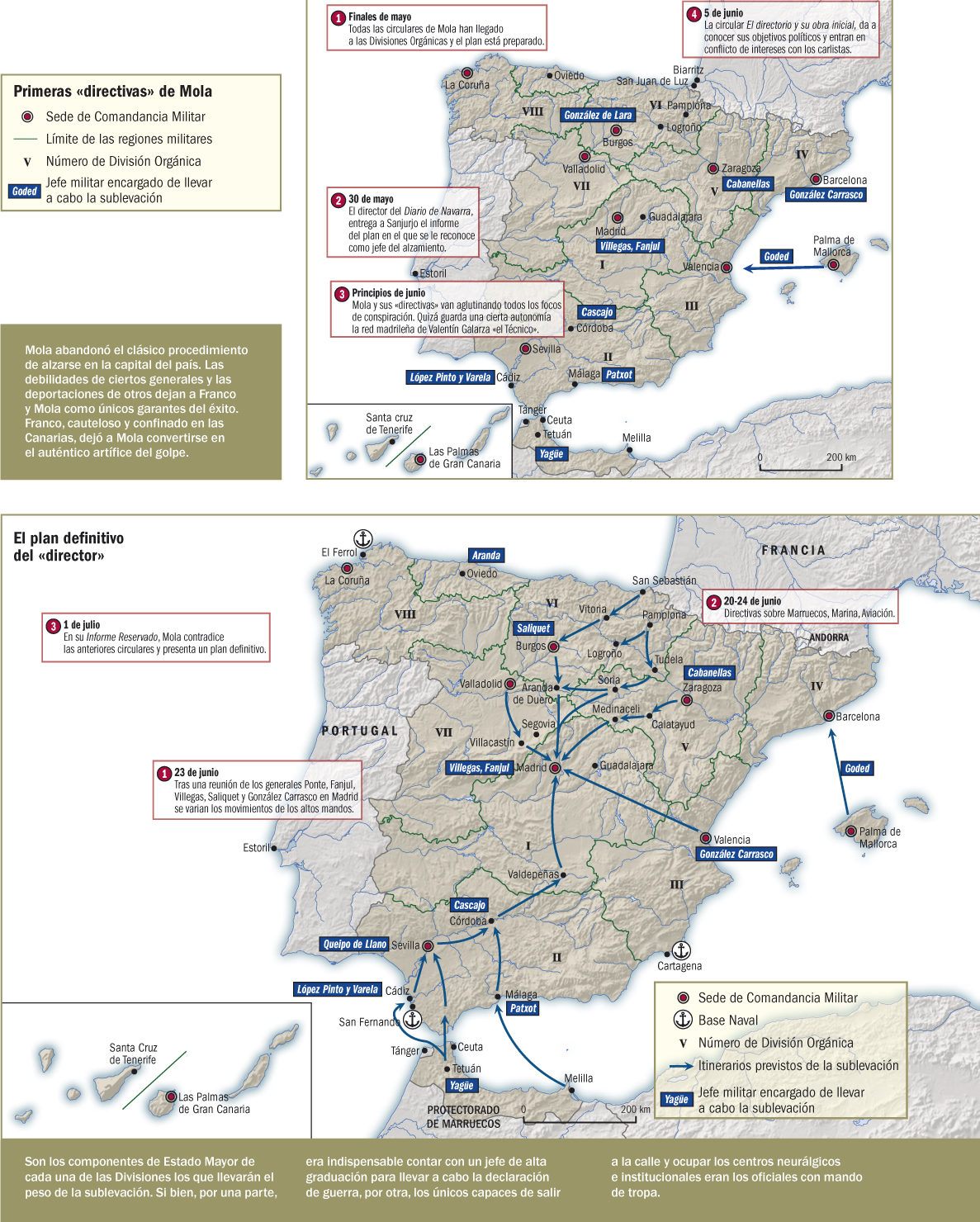
Centripetal plan

While the earlier plan of so-called Junta de Generales envisioned a centrifugal insurgency unfolding from Madrid towards other provinces, the plan developed by Mola was based upon the centripetal pattern. The coup was principally designed as a military exercise and it was constructed on basis of existing military structures. Success of the plan relied on taking control of command of provincial divisions, which would then converge upon Madrid. At the time there were 8 divisions (each based in respective military region) in peninsular Spain. Due to uneven development of the conspiracy network Mola was not sure how many of them would be taken over; he took into account the possibility that some divisions (most likely 1. in Madrid and 4. in Barcelona, perhaps one more) might remain loyal. However, he assumed that at least three divisions (most likely 5. in Zaragoza, 6. in Burgos and 7. in Valladolid) would rebel, and others (most likely 2. in Seville, 3. in Valencia and 8. in La Coruña) would either join or remain neutral/passive. Troops assembled by commanders of rebel divisions were expected to proceed towards Madrid and reach the outskirts of the capital in around 4 days. It was not clear what would happen later. The overall commander of rebel troops was to be general José Sanjurjo. Commanders of key divisions supposed to converge upon Madrid were generals Cabanellas (Zaragoza), Dávila (Burgos), and Saliquet (Valladolid). Rebel leaders in key cities were generals Villegas (Madrid), Goded (Barcelona), González Carrasco (Valencia) and Queipo de Llano (Seville). None of the sources consulted explains the logic of a staggered schedule, which envisioned the revolt to begin in Morocco and southern Spain 24-48 hours earlier than in the rest of peninsular garrisons.

=== Local takeover ===
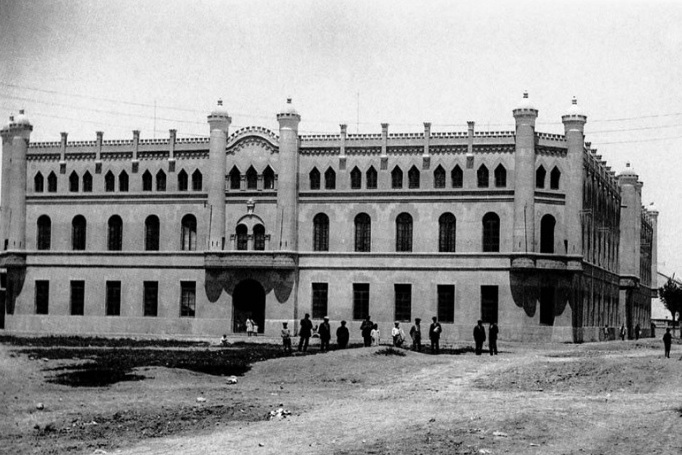
in absence of local army units Guardia Civil should lead the coup, like in Albacete. Photo: barracks (which would later serve as IB headquarters)

The plan was based on mid-level officers. They were expected either to convince their superiors to join or to overpower them; there was a senior rebel officer pre-appointed to take command of every division. The immediate objectives were 1) key military objects: divisional headquarters, headquarters of key army units, arms and munitions centres, vehicle depots, barracks, etc. Once in command of military infrastructure, the rebel leader was to announce the state of war in the region. The next step was 2) to take control of key administrative buildings: site of civil governor, site of diputación provincial, the town hall and the tribunal; all collective bodies were to be dissolved and individuals dismissed. Then, 3) vital infrastructural points were to follow: these included radio broadcasting stations, CAMPSA fuel depots, post and telegraph offices, prisons, power plants, banks, hydrological installations; continuity of their operations was to be ensured. Finally, 4) all would-be focos of popular resistance were to be seized: Casas del Pueblo, Ateneos, trade union headquarters, sites of left-wing political parties and left-wing newspapers. The action had to be "en extremo violenta"; some scholars claim this phrase stood for indiscriminate repression, possibly including extrajudicial killings. Explicit instructions envisioned that leaders of organisations which did not adhere to the coup were to be detained with ambiguous "exemplary punishment" administered. Military checkpoints were to be set up in key points of the city (major intersections, plazas, bridges).

=== Provisional local authorities ===
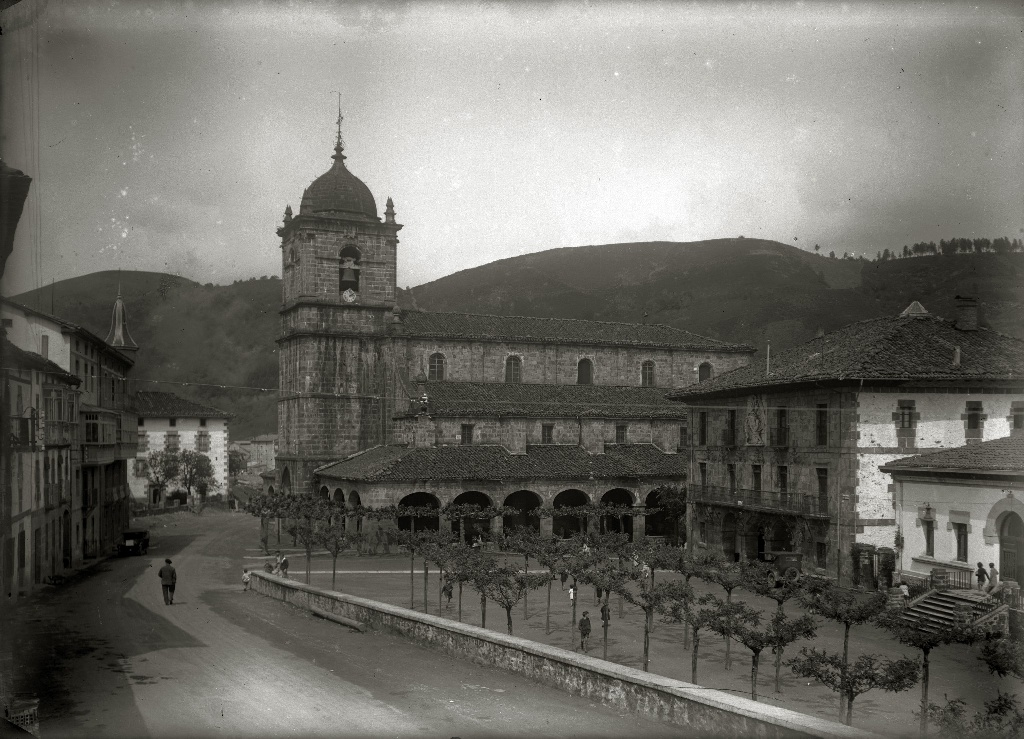
Ayuntamiento in a small Spanish town (Legazpi)

The rebel plan included appointees to lead every (except La Coruña) división orgánica after the coup. There was no doubt whatsoever that such officer was to be the supreme authority in the correspondent military region. In each of 8 capitals of organic divisions there would be also a Comité Militar set up; it would consist of representatives of each army branch (infantry, cavalry, engineers, intendancy etc.). Similar committees should be set up in other garrison cities; in case there would be only one army branch present, the committee would consist of 3 military men "de mayor categoriá". It is not clear what the relation of Comité Militar to rebel-appointed head of each división orgánica was expected to be. One paragraph mentioned briefly that the committee should "entenderse por conducto de su Presidente, con el Jefe Director del Movimiento o con la persona que lo represente". It is neither known whether there were officers appointed to act as supreme authority in every province. However, in every province seized there should be a Comité Provincial set up. Its size should be possibly limited; it would consist of unspecified "people of order", members of supporting militias and representatives of major economic entities. This Committee would be entrusted with local appointments, ensuring continuous operations of local infrastructure, enforcing public order, providing necessary assistance to army units and in general to serve as civilian link to the military. Once the situation is stable, in every province a joint Comité Provincial Cívico-Militar should be set up.

=== Advance towards Madrid ===
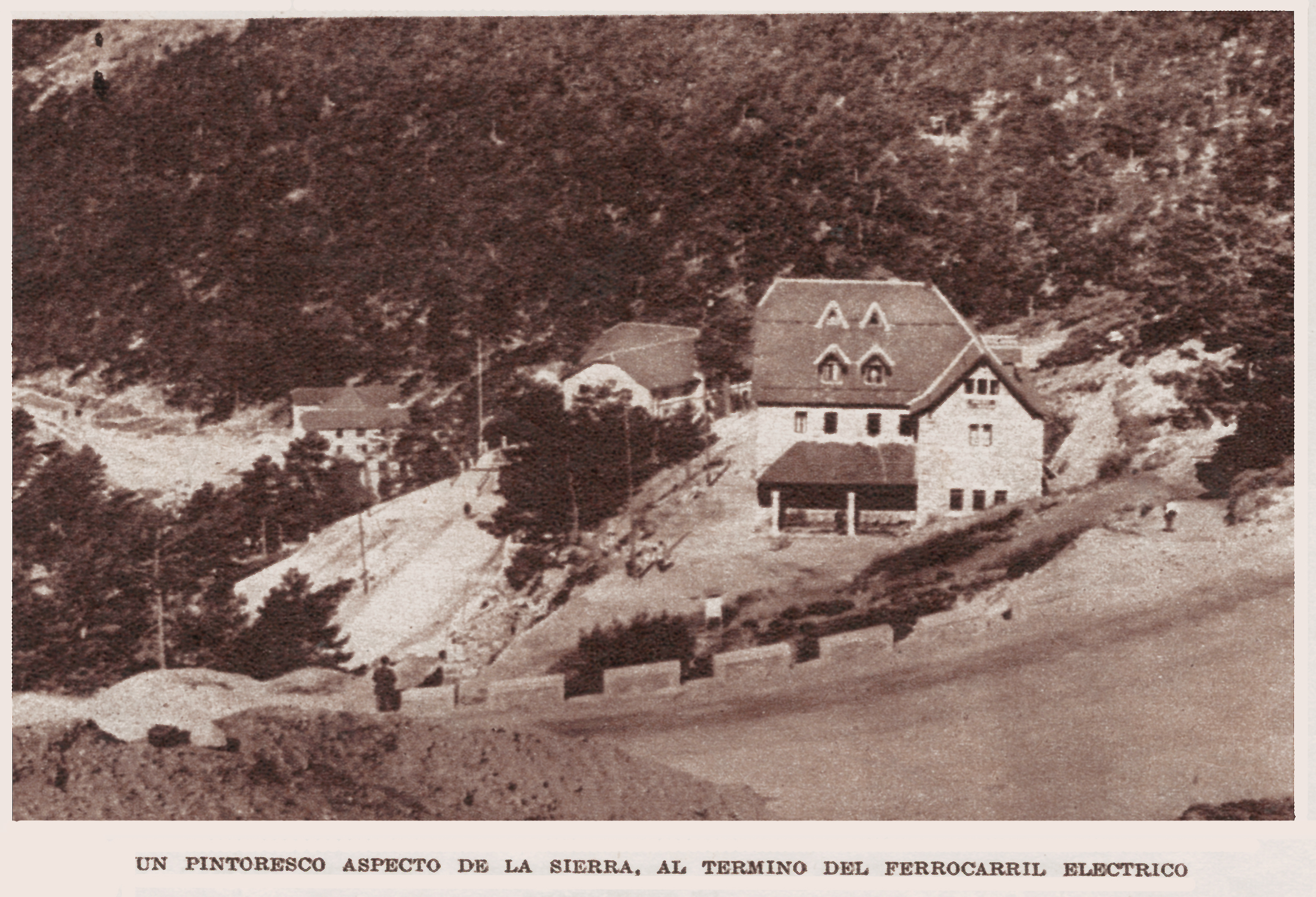
Navacerrada Pass; Valladolid column should be here in 60 hours

At least three rebel divisional headquarters (Valladolid, Burgos, Zaragoza) were each to assemble a force ("columna") of some 2000–3000 troops, to advance towards Madrid (Valencia was to stage a diversionary attack, African troops disembarked in western Andalusia were included last minute). In case of Zaragoza it was to consist of four infantry battalions, two cavalry squadrons, two artillery batteries, and one engineering company; in case of Valladolid it was to consist of three infantry battalions, three cavalry squadrons, three artillery batteries, and two companies of pioneers. There were key routes of advance specified; the Valladolid column should proceed via Segovia/Ávila and León/Navacerrada, the Burgos column via Aranda de Duero and Somosierra, the Zaragoza column via Calatayud and Medinacelli, and the Valencia column via Tarancón. The columns should advance during the night. Each column was fully motorized, e.g. a battalion from Navarre was supposed to move in 35 buses, 10 trucks and a handful of smaller vehicles. Each column should proceed in appropriate marching formation. If possible (but thought unlikely), railway transport should be taken advantage of. All regular logistics services were to follow, including transport of cattle for slaughter. Mid-points were established for every specific day and the advance was broken down into 3 phases: 1) hours 0-36; 2) hours 36-60; 3) hours 60-84. In 4 days troops advancing from the north should be 40-50 km from Madrid (the Zaragoza column in Guadalajara and the Valladolid column in Escorial). Advancing troops should co-ordinate their approach; the Valladolid and Zaragoza columns were supposed to outflank (respectively from the west and from the east) and cut off enemy units which might have blocked the Burgos column at Somosierra, converging in their rear in the Lozoyuela sector.

=== Resistance anticipated ===
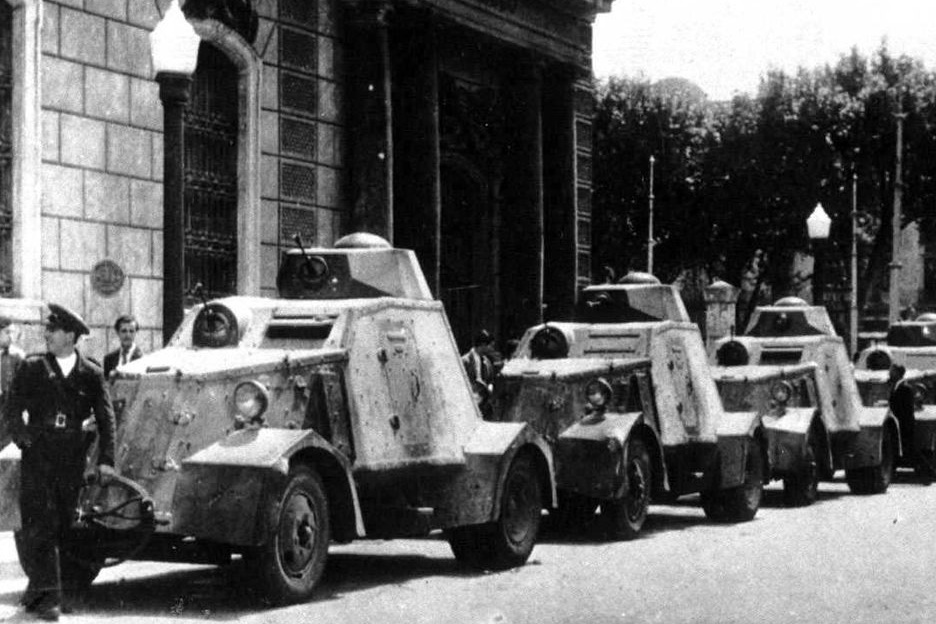
Armored vehicles of Guardia de Asalto, feared by Mola

Mola did not believe in a smooth, bloodless coup and did anticipate resistance. He included artillery and pioneers with explosives in advancing columns; he also gave specific orders regarding the column line-up, with far vanguard units 20 km ahead and trucks with mortars and machine-guns ready to fire in front of the main detachment. He allowed 84 hours for motorised troops to cover relatively short distances, e.g. merely 150 km from Valladolid to Escorial. Mola seemed most concerned about enemy aviation and Guardia de Asalto. To counter the former he envisioned a nightly advance, to counter the latter – especially its armoured vehicles – he ordered mortars and artillery to be always ready. The rebel plan did not specify what sort of combat was expected on approaches and in Madrid. It is neither known what scale of resistance and how many casualties were anticipated in general, yet given Mola made few sanitary and materiel provisions it appears he believed the outcome of the coup to be decided in 2 weeks. He thought failure in some garrisons likely, e.g. in Barcelona, where insurgency might have bordered a semi-suicidal attempt, or in Madrid, where (as option B) he instructed rebels to remain in the barracks and await arrival of northern columns. Mola took into account also a would-be failure of the entire coup. In such case, he ordered withdrawal to the left bank of the Ebro and formation of a defensive frontline from Zaragoza to Miranda; Navarre would have been the last rebel stronghold. He admitted that personally he might end up crossing the Pyrenees in disguise when fleeing to France; also Queipo might have arranged for escape to Portugal.

== Political plan ==
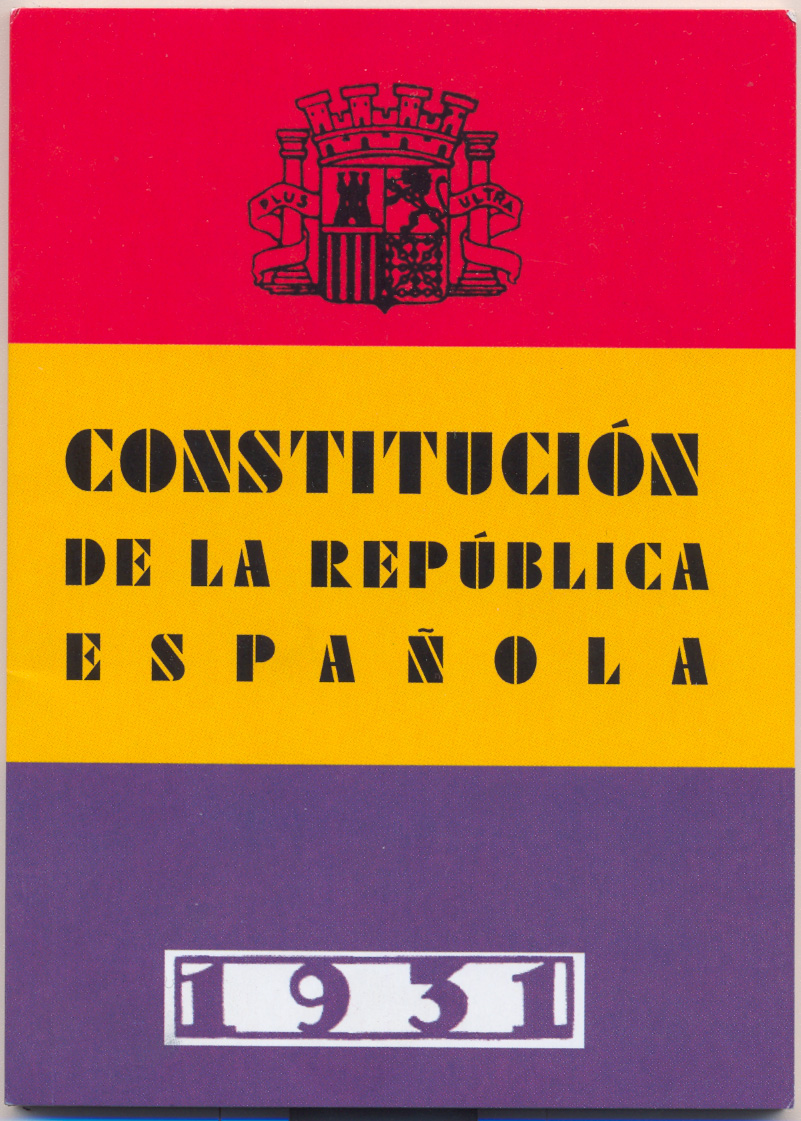

Political vision as to how the post-coup Spain would look like was confused and vague. This was partially the result of political divisions within the officer corps, e.g. some conspirators were fiercely monarchist (Kindelán, Orgaz) and some were fiercely republican (Mola, Goded). Ambiguity resulted also from the corporative military perception that it was the political class which by pursuing party interests brought the country to the brink of disaster, and hence, that political declarations should be scaled to a minimum; the rising was to be "for Spain", with no specific political goal. This was the reason why military conspirators were determined not to make any political commitments when speaking e.g. to the Falangists or the Carlists. This, on the other hand, would soon not prevent key rebels - like Mola, Franco, or Queipo - from flying the republican tri-color flag and ending their radio broadcasts or manifestos with "¡Viva la República!".

The period immediately after the coup was to be a "brief parenthesis" in the constitutional life. The 1931 constitution would be suspended and president and the government dismissed. All power (except judiciary) would be assumed by all-military "Directorio" of a president and 4 members, heading key ministries, while "consejeros técnicos" would take over other specific branches of public administration. Having introduced law and order, the Directorate would organize elections to a constituent assembly; they were to be held "in the manner that shall be deemed most appropriate", but with introduction of a carné electoral, not available to illiterates and criminals. The assembly would then decide upon the future regime of the country.

Despite references to a constituent assembly deciding upon the future, conspirators envisioned some political tasks for the Directorio itself. Though it was not supposed to alter the republican regime, it was also to abolish all legislation incompatible with "new organic system of the state". There was no mention about doing away with the party system altogether, yet parties who receive "inspiration from abroad" were to be banned. All republican secular laws, religious liberty and separation of Church and state were to be maintained, yet there would be no "persecución religiosa". Also all republican social legislation would remain in place. Agrarian problem would be solved "on the basis of developing small property", with a cryptic note on "collective cultivation where the former is not possible". Further social tones were introduced by pledges to do away with unemployment and illiteracy. The future state would be "strong and disciplined". Some scholars, however, quote documents which envisioned a decisively distinct version, with earlier legislation as to "materia religiosa y social" reverted, the party system abolished and vague references to "otros países" setting an example.

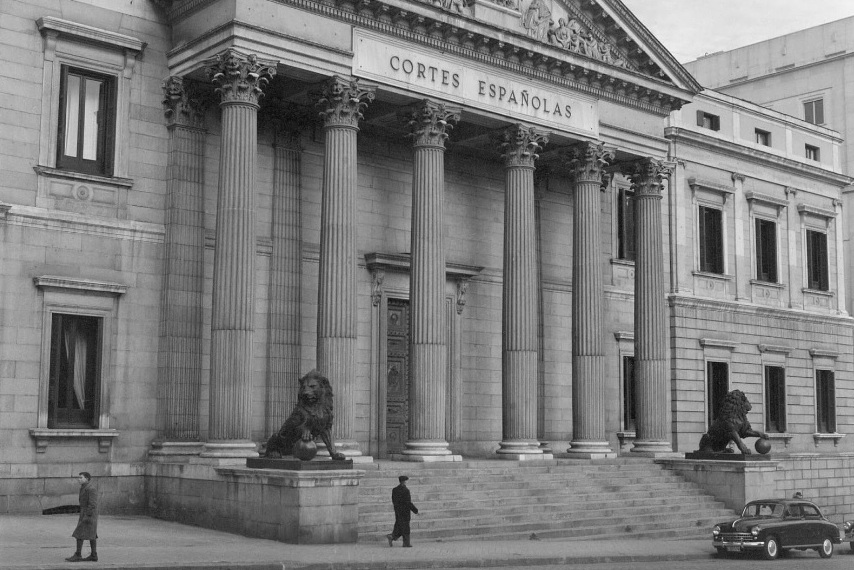
Cortes building, 1950s

Historiographic synthetic descriptions as to the idea of future Spain held by the conspirators are not very much different. Though in some works – usually focused on other topics – there are references to a "Fascist coup", in specialized works it is more likely to find passages merely evoking the Fascist theme. The qualification which seems to prevail is this of an authoritarian vision, advanced by scholars as different in their understanding of the republic and war as Casanova and Payne. The former blends it with militarism, nationalism and praetorianism, the latter speculates about a "semi-pluralist authoritarian solution", perhaps similar to the Portuguese regime of Salazar or the Polish one of Piłsudski. It has never been established what was meant by "nuevo sistema orgánico del Estado", mentioned by Mola, and whether it had anything to do with "democracia orgánica", an auto-denomination adopted later by the Francoist regime. However, no scholar claims that the system which emerged from the war was anywhere near the plans held by the conspirators, let alone that any of the plotting generals envisioned Francisco Franco as an absolute ruler, one state party, a parliament of appointees and almost 40 years of dictatorship.

== Controversies ==
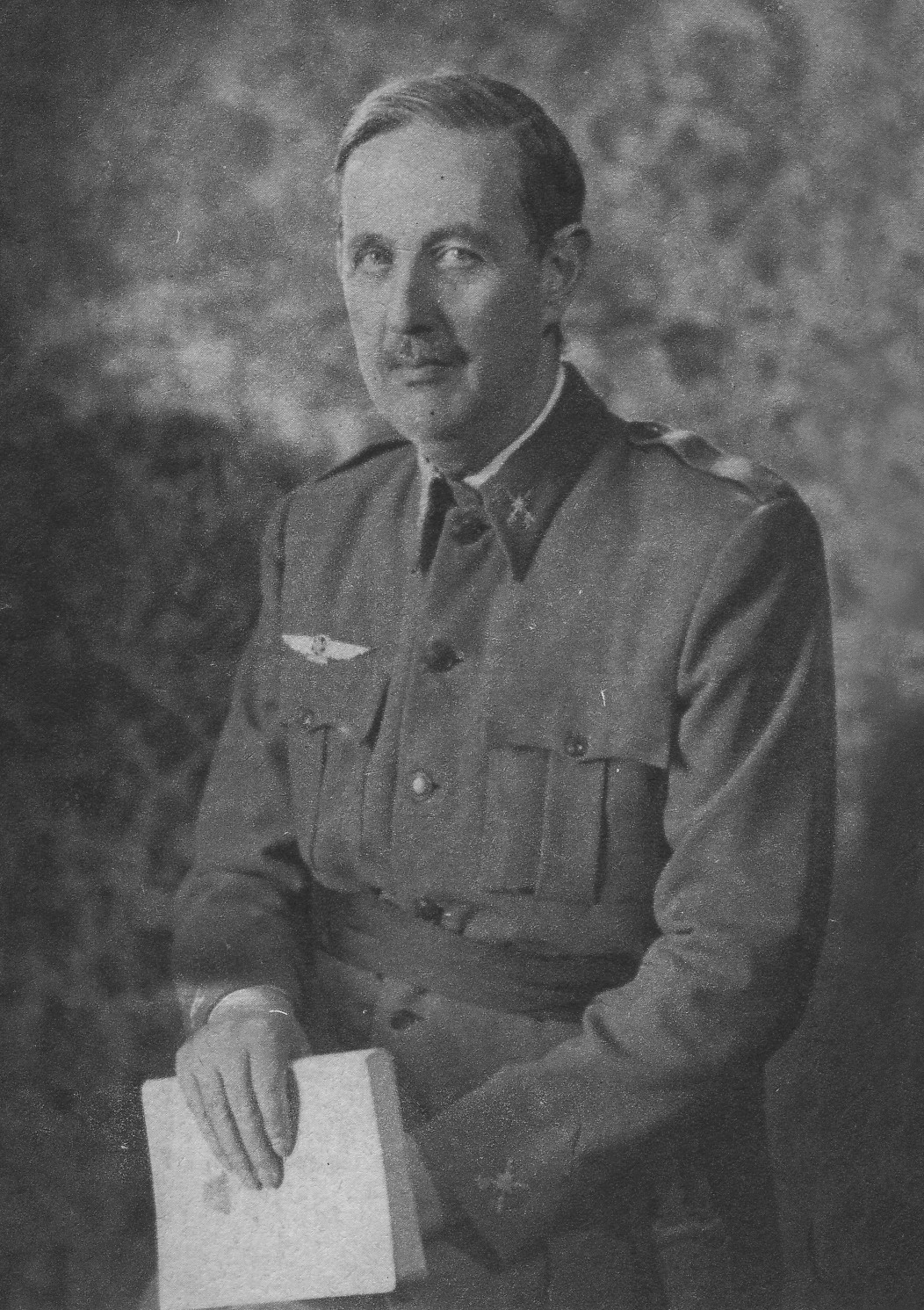
Kindelán

Despite enormous volume of historiographic output dedicated to the Spanish Civil War, there are numerous questions related to the conspiracy which either remain unanswered, or remain the subject of controversy between historians who offer conflicting answers.

- when started? In many works the narrative on military conspiracy starts with the meeting of March 8, 1936. However, there are scholars who claim that representations made by some generals to Portela and other governmental officials during the election night of February 16 amount to attempt of a military coup, which later paved the way for further plotting. Some authors maintain that "conspiracy against the Popular Front government commenced even before the elections", namely during a meeting of a handful of generals in January 1936. There are also historians who line up all sorts of right-wing subversive plans and initiatives, developed during the lifetime of the Second Republic, as one anti-republican conspiracy, or claim that the conspiracy began even earlier.
- meticulously or poorly organised? Some scholars underline the scale of preparatory work; they note its high level of granularity defined by detailed instructions, complex network of personal appointments, the scope - covering apart from the army also the navy, Guardia Civil and Moroccan garrison, and flexibility - which allowed for options and included a contingency plan. Others are of exactly the opposite opinion: to them, the plan was sketchy, superficial, vague, with many loose ends, no navy arrangements, based on numerous unrealistic assumptions and without taking into account crucial factors, like the level of mobilization among the radical workers' left.
- praetorian or Fascist? This controversy is about the political dimension of the coup. Praetorian coups, carried out by the military, were calibrated to change the executive but not necessarily the regime and did not involve any elaborate political or ideological scheme; the 1936 conspirators reportedly remained rather vague as to the future regime and some actually intended to defend the Second Republic against radical left-wing revolution. The adverse theory maintains that the coup planned was marked by a clear Fascist blueprint, characterised by fierce anti-revolutionary zeal, nationalism and extreme repression, and that the coup gave rise to the Franco regime, basically a local, Spanish version of Fascism.
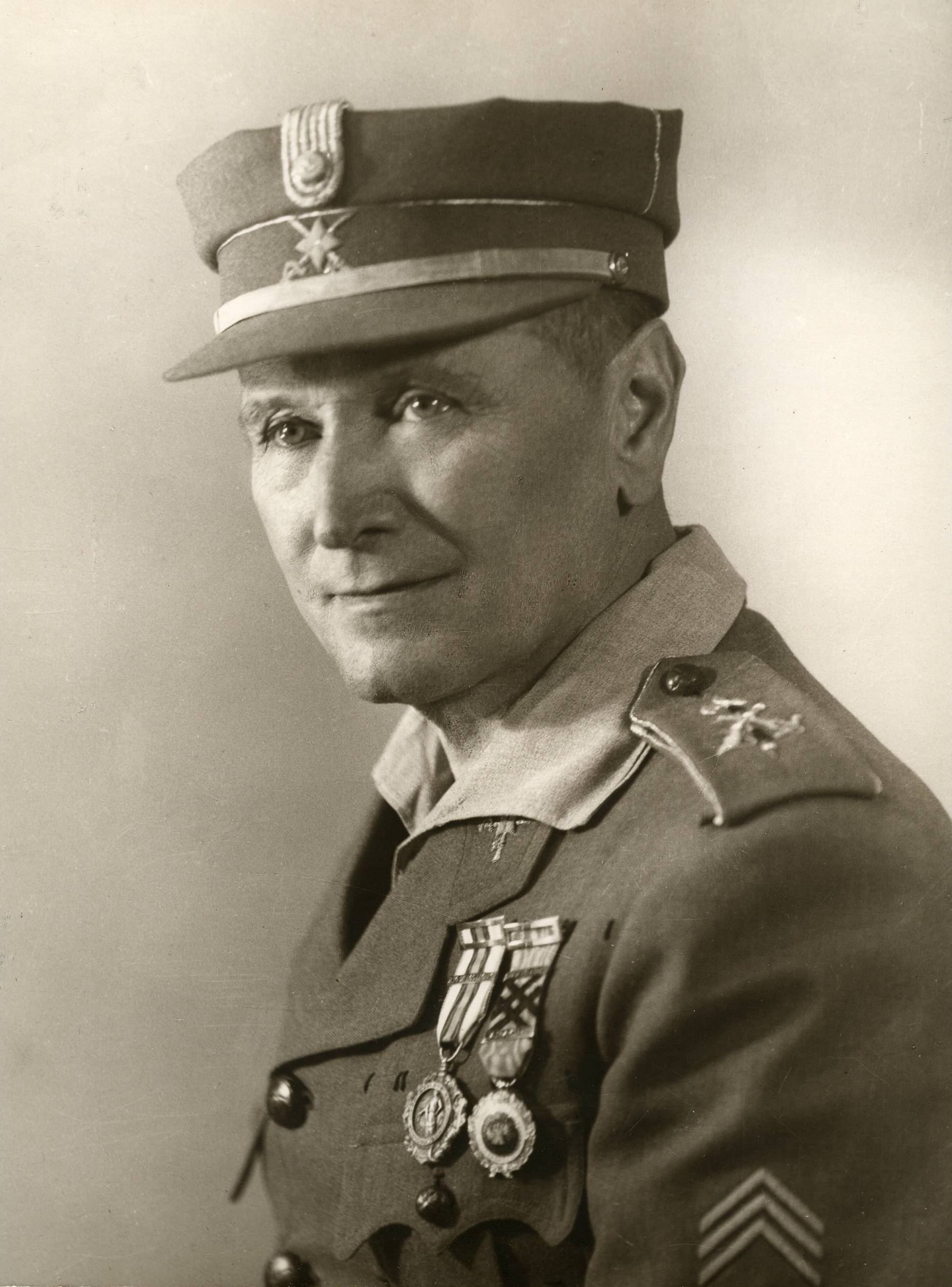
Ponte
- one or few conspiracies? Even if clearly independent Carlist and Falangist insurrectional schemes are counted out, there are different perspectives as to what was going on within the military. One option is that at different stages there were 4 various plots, related to UME, Junta de Generales, chaotic local conspiracies and Mola; at different stages they remained independent or even alternative. Another one is that though fragmented and developing erratically, in fact there was one military conspiracy. Yes, there was sort of personal competition among its leaders and yes, the conspiracy included various currents, but they have never been competitive and eventually they all converged in one scheme.
- UME: technical or pivotal? There is a historiographic school which claims that UME emerged in 1933 already formatted as an anti-Republican conspiracy, that it continued for 3 years and provided an impulse for more senior officers to form their own intrigue, and that Tarduchy, Barba and others should be considered first leaders of the plot, which eventually developed along the new lines. The alternative perspective is that UME emerged to defend corporative interests of the military caste and that it did not necessarily assume a rebellious stand. Its role within the conspiracy was technical, and it consisted of providing reliable communication channels, established during previous years.
- civilians: negligible or leading the way? there is little agreement as to the role of specific parties (especially CEDA and Renovación Española) and specific individuals (especially Gil-Roblés and Calvo Sotelo). One view is that their positional was marginal; they were merely provided with some general info about the conspiracy and civilians in no meaningful way contributed to it, perhaps except local assistance by Comunión Tradicionalista and Falange militants. Another view is that CEDA and Renovación politicians pulled the strings; they insitgated generals to step in, they inspired the coup, they largely financed it, and they ensured foreign military support (with the Sainz Rodríguez deal playing prominent role).
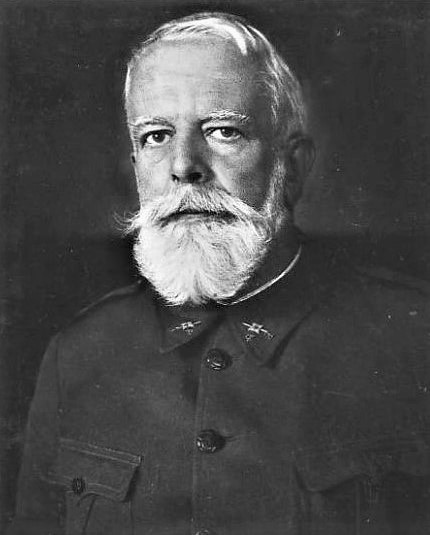
Cabanellas
- death of Calvo: trigger or irrelevant? According to one perspective the killing of Calvo was absolutely vital and until the murder, things might have developed differently: first, many officers vacillated and the conspiracy command was aware of it, second, key plotters considered the situation in Spain grave, but not hopeless. The alternative narrative is that conspirators resolved to rebellion weeks if not months prior to the killing of Calvo, that aircraft for Franco has already departed from London, and that though no date has been fixed, on July 12 it was already decided that the coup would take place in the second half of July.
- one or four models? Until recently it has been assumed that the plan of the coup, acted upon in July 1936, envisioned a fairly homogeneous modus operandi, perhaps with the exception of Madrid, where the insurgents were instructed not to confront the workers and focus on securing roads leading to the city. The recently coined idea is that in fact, the plan differentiated between 4 types of action: 1) where conspirators were likely to take control of the garrison; 2) where local garrison was of unclear loyalty; 3) where there was no significant military garrison and public order formations were supposed to rise; and 4) where there was no reliable plot developed both among the military and among the Civiles and Asaltos.
- focused on key cities or developed evenly? According to one theory the plan was concentrated on key points, namely major cities, mostly the capitals of respective provinces which were home to significant military garrisons; in each of them triumphant rebels were then expected to take control of the rest of the province and/or neighboring provinces. The alternative opinion is that the plan covered all provincial cities and in some cases a few more (e.g. in Asturias, with separate plans for Oviedo and Gijón), that it took account even of cities with no military garrisons (e.g. Albacete), with the level of detail probably never to be finally known to historians.
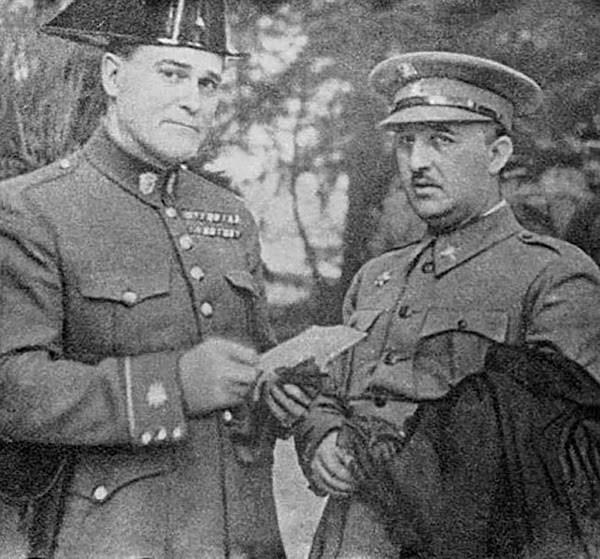
Franco
- leadership: Mola or collective? There is a very strong historiographic current which points to Mola as de-facto leader, from the moment when in late April he issued his first instrucción until the coup. However, some point that he assumed clear leadership only in late May, that initially the Madrid-based generals formed the nucleus, and that Mola has always been seeking Sanjurjo's approval on key issues. There are also historians who claim that since mid-spring the conspiracy was run by sort of a triumvirate, composed of Mola, Cabanellas and Queipo. The issue remains unclear as there is almost no evidence how the plan was being developed, be it in terms of military or political planning.
- Franco: gas or brakes? According to one school Franco was among the most hesitant conspirators, the one who endlessly kept raising objections; until almost the last moment he preferred to wait and hope for a political solution. There is also an opposite current (advanced particularly by the Francoist propaganda); it presents the coup and even the conspiracy in highly personalist terms, as "Franco's coup" or similar. The points raised in present-day historiography are that Franco intended to carry out a coup already few hours after the February 16 elections, that he was present during the crucial March 8 meeting, that he was constantly on the loop, that the role of his Moroccan troops would be crucial, and that he vacillated not because he tried to avoid bloodshed, but simply because he considered the plot not developed well enough.
- Sanjurjo: leader or figurehead? Most historiographic accounts of the 1936 conspiracy dedicate little attention to the figure of José Sanjurjo. It is noted that he was elected due to the prestige gained during Rif Wars and his role in the 1932 plot, but that his location on exile in Portugal rendered communication difficult, apart that he was not even in the Spanish army, let alone leading any garrison. Within this perspective he appears as a prestigious figurehead. However, scholars who recently researched papers from his archive document he was consulted and pronounced on numerous issues, that during some periods he acted as spiritus movens, actually pushing for action, and that it was Sanjurjo who in July secured the deal with the Carlists.

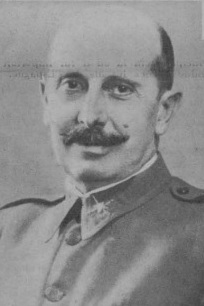
Dávila

- military coup or counter-revolution? Advocates of the praetorian theory underline that the conspirators remained extremely skeptical about civilians; the military considered themselves the healthy backbone of the nation, versus rotten political class which brought the country to the brink of collapse with their party interests. Hence, the generals preferred to keep politicians at arms' length and refrained from political commitments. However, the antipodal view is that sort of counter-revolution was from the onset being prepared by conservative sections of the society, and that military coup was merely a format adopted by this movement. Civilians were envisaged to sit in provincial post-coup executive bodies, right-wing organizations did take part, and in some regions – e.g. in Navarre – sort of an alternative conservative society developed.
- planned repression: massive or limited? The question is whether according to the conspirators the coup was to be accompanied by indiscriminate and bloody violence against civilian population, or whether they intended to limit repression to necessary exemplary show-cases. The debate focuses on interpretation of few ambiguous statements in Mola's instrucciones and on speculations to what extent the later scale of killings in the Nationalist rear was rooted in the conspiracy, or rather to what extent it developed during the war. The answer conditions the judgement whether conspirators were genocidal criminals, who with cold blood planned future atrocities.

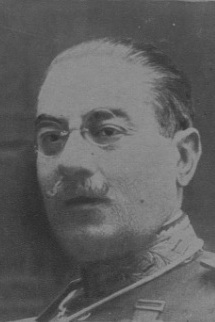
Villegas

- old-style or new-type? There are opinions that the conspiracy was geared up for a pronunciamiento. The term stands for a palace coup, typical for Spain of the 19th century; its key features were military character, limitation to few highly positioned individuals and being focused on the capital; its outdated character was marked by a false assumption that like in the 19-th century, most population would remain passive. A competitive opinion is that alignement with radical right-wing movements (Carlists, Falangists), wide geographical coverage, Fascist flavor and massive repression envisaged demonstrate that conspirators planned an action tailored to fit in the new, modern era of mass mobilization.
- against democracy or against revolution? Numerous scholars underline that the conspiracy was principally aimed against the Spanish democracy, operational as political regime of the Second Republic. However, some historians maintain that the conspiracy should be viewed as principally a plot neither against democracy nor the republic, but rather against Frente Popular. There is also a historiographic current which notes that democracy in Spain collapsed during the February 1936 elections and afterwards, and that conspirators calibrated their plot against what they perceived as forthcoming radical left-wing revolution.
- foreign involvement: material or marginal? Scholars who highlight foreign involvement point to the Sainz Rodriguez's contract, to military training which monarchists received earlier near Rome, to ideological proximity between conspirators and Fascist/Nazi regimes, to contracts signed by Gil-Roblés when Minister of War in 1935, or to Sanjurjo's trip to Germany in early 1936. The opponents maintain that earlier trainings or contracts had nothing to do with military conspiracy, that the purpose of Sanjurjo's trip is unknown, that it remains unclear how Sainz Rodríguez's contract has been related to the plot, and that Franco's alliance with Fascist Italy and Nazi Germany does not substantiate the thesis of any earlier links.

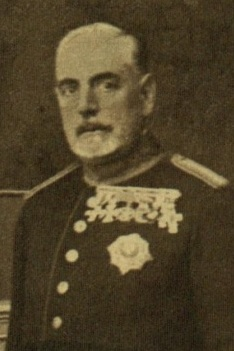
Fanjul

- alea iacta est: July 12, 13, 14 or 15? Most historiographic works, even fairly detailed ones, do not provide clear information as to exactly when Mola issued the orders to rise, the move which marked the point of no return. If a date is given, it might appear either as Tuesday July 14 or as Wednesday July 15. From some works it might appear that Mola did not issue a single order, intended for all high commanders supposed to lead the rising, but that he was issuing separate orders to specific military districts or even specific garrisons, a process which could have taken place during some time between July 14 and July 15. Some works point even to July 13 or July 12.
- start: July 17, 18 or 20? Scholars agree that the coup was envisaged to develop along a staggering scheme, with Morocco and Andalusian garrisons rising 24-48 hours earlier than the remaining ones. However, some claim that the coup was to begin in Morocco in the afternoon of July 17 ("el 17 a las 17 horas"), and some claim that the rebellion was to start in Morocco in the early morning of July 18. One author claims that most peninsular garrisons were supposed to rise by July 20, the Andalusian ones slightly earlier, Morocco still earlier and the Canary Islands even earlier, and that the peninsular rising on July 18-19 was hurried due to premature insurgency in Morocco.
- picturesque details Specific historiographic accounts might differ as to unimportant, but picturesque details, e.g. places where a specific conspiracy meeting took place or literal text of specific notes, exchanged by conspirators. An example is the message sent by Franco to Mola on July 12. In some works the message is quoted as "geografía Tetuán insuficiente" (also "geografía de Tetuán insuficiente"), the phrase which barely makes sense altogether ("insufficient room in Tetuán"?). However, in some works the message is quoted as "geografía poco extensa"; the translation would be "limited visibility" or, in a more free version, "the situation is not clear to me".

== Annex: highest-ranking conspirators ==
Below tables list generals who took part in the conspiracy, listed according to their position as in the official escalafón, a ranking maintained by the Ministry of War, as of July 1936. The escalafón included generals who were in reserve, but excluded generals who were retired (e.g. Kindelán, Dávila) or who had been expelled from the army (e.g. Sanjurjo). The tables do not include generals as to which there is no agreement whether they were involved in conspiracy (e.g. Virgilio Cabanellas Ferrer). None of 3 generals at the highest rank of teniente general was involved in the plot. Not all of the generals listed rebelled, as some had last-minute second thoughts or on July 18-19 they remained ambiguous. Individuals listed might have joined the conspiracy at different point between March and July; also, their taking part did not imply they committed to a coup. N=Nationalists, R=Republicans.

=== Division generals ===
Ranked	Name	Age	Position	Rebelled?	Future fate	Death
2	Miguel Cabanellas Ferrer	64	head of 5. Division (Zaragoza)	yes	head of National Defense Junta, died of natural causes	1938
3	Ángel Rodríguez del Barrio	60	in Supreme Military Tribunal	no	under R supervision, died of natural causes	1936
5	Manuel Goded Llopis	54	commander of Balearic Islands	yes	captured by R, tried, executed	1936
7	Gonzalo Queipo de Llano Sierra	61	general inspector of Carabineros	yes	initially major role in N command, later marginalised	1951
9	Rafael Villegas Montesinos	61	at ministerial disposal	no	imprisoned by R, killed in Modelo prison	1936
11	Andrés Saliquet Zumeta	59	at ministerial disposal	yes	major admin and judiciary roles	1959
14	Manuel González Carrasco	59	at ministerial disposal	no	fled to N, later no major role	1958
23	Francisco Franco Bahamonde	44	commander of Canary Islands	yes	rebel military leader, caudillo of Spain	1975
24	Joaquín Fanjul Goñi	56	at ministerial disposal	yes	captured by R, tried, executed	1936

=== Brigade generals ===
Ranked	Name	Age	Position	Rebelled?	Future fate	Death
1	Luis Orgaz Yoldi	55	at ministerial disposal	yes	major admin and judiciary roles	1946
3	Emilio Mola Vidal	49	head of 12. Inf. Brig. (Pamplona)	yes	head of N general staff, died in aviation accident	1937
5	Gonzalo González de Lara	62	head of 11. Inf. Brig. (Burgos)	yes	detained by R, liberated by N, KIA	1936
7	Francisco Patxot Madoz	60	head of 4. Inf. Brig. (Malaga)	yes	captured by R, killed in prison	1936
8	Manuel Llanos Medina	63	at ministerial disposal	yes	minor N military roles, since 1939 in reserve	1953
9	Gregorio Benito Terraza	57	head of 10. Inf. Brig. (Huesca)	yes	minor N military roles, died of natural causes	1936
11	Carlos Bosch Bosch	63	head of 16. Ing. Brig. (Leon)	yes	minor roles, since 1937 in reserve	+1937
17	Eliseo Álvarez-Arenas Romero	54	head of 9. Inf. Brig. (Zaragoza)	yes	major admin and Guardia Civil roles	1966
22	José López-Pinto Berizo	60	head of Cadiz naval base	yes	major military and admin roles	1942
24	Álvaro Fernández Burriel	57	head of 2. Cav. Brig. (Barcelona)	yes	captured by R, tried, executed	1936
25	Anselmo Otero-Cossio Morales	?	head of 7. Pion. Brig. (Valladolid)	yes	minor N roles, died of natural causes	1937
26	José Iglesias Martínez	?	head of 8. Inf. Brig. (Pontevedra)	yes	retired in late 1936	?
27	Ricardo Morales Díaz	62	head of El Ferrol garrison	yes	minor N roles, retired 1937	1948
35	Manuel García Álvarez	62	head of 14. Inf. Brig. (Salamanca)	yes	admin N roles, died of natural causes	1938
37	Marcial Barro García	57	head of 13. Inf. Brig. (Valladolid)	yes	major N admin roles, retired 1941	1944
41	Jacinto Fernández Ampón	60	head of 1. Mntn Brig. (Barcelona)	yes	captured by R, imprisoned, killed in sacas	1936
43	Víctor Carrasco Amilibia	61	head of 6. Artil. Brig. (Logroño)	yes	detained by N, tried, imprisoned, released 1939	?
44	Gerardo Ravassa Cuevas	?	head of 7. Artil. Brig. (Valladolid)	yes	captured by R while on leave, imprisoned, killed in sacas	1938
46	Eduardo Martín-González	63	head of 5. Artil. Brig. (Zaragoza)	yes	minor N roles, soon retired	1955
47	Fernando Capaz Montes	42	head of Spanish Morocco (west)	no	captured by R, imprisoned, killed in sacas	1936
48	José Bosch Atienza	64	head of Minorca garrison	yes	captured by R, tried, executed	1936
50	Justo Legorburu Domínguez	63	head of 4. Artil. Brig. (Barcelona)	yes	captured by R, imprisoned, killed in sacas	1936
55	José Enrique Varela	45	at ministerial disposal	yes	major military and admin N roles	1951
57	Antonio Ferrer de Miguel	?	head of 1. Cav. Brig. (Palencia)	yes	major military and admin N roles	+1963

== See also ==
- Spanish coup of July 1936
- Second Spanish Republic
- 1936 Carlist coup attempt
- Spanish Civil War
