= Reign of Alfonso XIII =

History of Spain from 1886 to 1931

Reign of Alfonso XIII of Spain
- 1885–1931
- Reign of Alfonso XIII Coat of arms

Government
  - King of Spain: Alfonso XIII
- President of the Spanish Council of Ministers
  - 1885–1890: Práxedes Mateo Sagasta
  - 1931: Juan Bautista Aznar-Cabañas
  - Restoration Courts: Senate
  - Lower house: Congress of Deputies
- History
  - Death of Alfonso XII of Spain: 25 November 1885
  - Regency of Maria Christina of Austria: 1885–1902
  - Constitutional period of the reign of Alfonso XIII: 1902–1923
  - Coup d'état: 13–15 September 1923
  - Dictatorship of Primo de Rivera: 1923–1930
  - Dictablanda of Dámaso Berenguer: 1930–1931
  - Proclamation of the Second Spanish Republic: 14 April 1931

Alfonso XIII became King of Spain at the moment of his birth in May 1886 because his father, Alfonso XII, had died five months earlier. His mother, Maria Christina of Austria, was regent until May 1902, when he turned sixteen and took the oath of office under the Constitution of 1876, when he began his personal reign, which lasted until 14 April 1931, when he had to go into exile after the proclamation of the Second Republic.

== Stages ==
The reign is usually divided into several stages:

- The regency of Maria Christina of Austria (1885–1902) was "a particularly significant period in the history of Spain, for in those years at the end of the century the system knew its stabilisation, the development of liberal policies, but also the appearance of major fissures that in the international arena were expressed first with the colonial war and later with the US, causing the military and diplomatic defeat that led to the loss of the colonies after the Treaty of Paris in 1898. On the domestic front, Spanish society underwent a considerable mutation, with the emergence of such significant political realities as the emergence of n, the strengthening of a workers' movement with dual socialist and anarchist affiliation, and the continued persistence, albeit declining, of the Republican and Carlist oppositions.
- The constitutional period (1902–1923) was the period of his personal reign during which King Alfonso XIII kept to the role conferred on him by the 1876 Constitution which governed during the Bourbon Restoration in Spain, although he did not limit himself to playing a symbolic role but actively intervened in political life, especially in military matters, thanks to the relatively broad powers held by the Crown. The political king, the politician on the throne, was thus an obstacle to the transformation of the political regime of the Restoration into a parliamentary monarchy, and his intervention "became more marked at times when the parties (of the time) showed little internal cohesion and opinion did not opt for a leader in a clear way. In those circumstances, the monarch's decision to hand over power to one or another political leader constituted a decisive participation in the internal politics of the parties'.
- The dictatorship of Primo de Rivera (1923–1930) was the second period of Alfonso XIII's personal reign in which the king did not oppose Primo de Rivera's coup d'état, bringing the liberal regime to an end. In this way, Alfonso XIII linked his fate to that of the Dictatorship, so that when Primo de Rivera failed in his attempt to establish an authoritarian regime and resigned in January 1930, the monarchy itself was called into question.
- General Berenguer's dictablanda (1930–1931) was unable to prevent the growth of the republican option, which led to the proclamation of the Second Spanish Republic on 14 April 1931, and Alfonso XIII was forced to go into exile. As historian Manuel Suárez Cortina has pointed out, "in the years that he was at the helm of state affairs, Alfonso XIII was able to observe a notable change in Spanish society: the consolidation of an autonomous workers' movement, the affirmation of regionalism and peripheral nationalism, the formation of an economic system with markedly protectionist features and various attempts to modernise the political system, which seemed unfeasible from the middle of the second half of the century". According to historian Javier Moreno Luzón, the changes that took place during his reign "provoked very serious social and political conflicts.... Spain did not resemble Great Britain, but neither did it resemble an African colony; it was closer to Italy and other second-tier European states which, at the beginning of the 20th century, were entering into complex mass politics".

== Regency of Maria Christina of Habsburg (1885–1902) ==
=== "Pact of El Pardo" and Sagasta's "Long Parliament" (1885–1890) ===
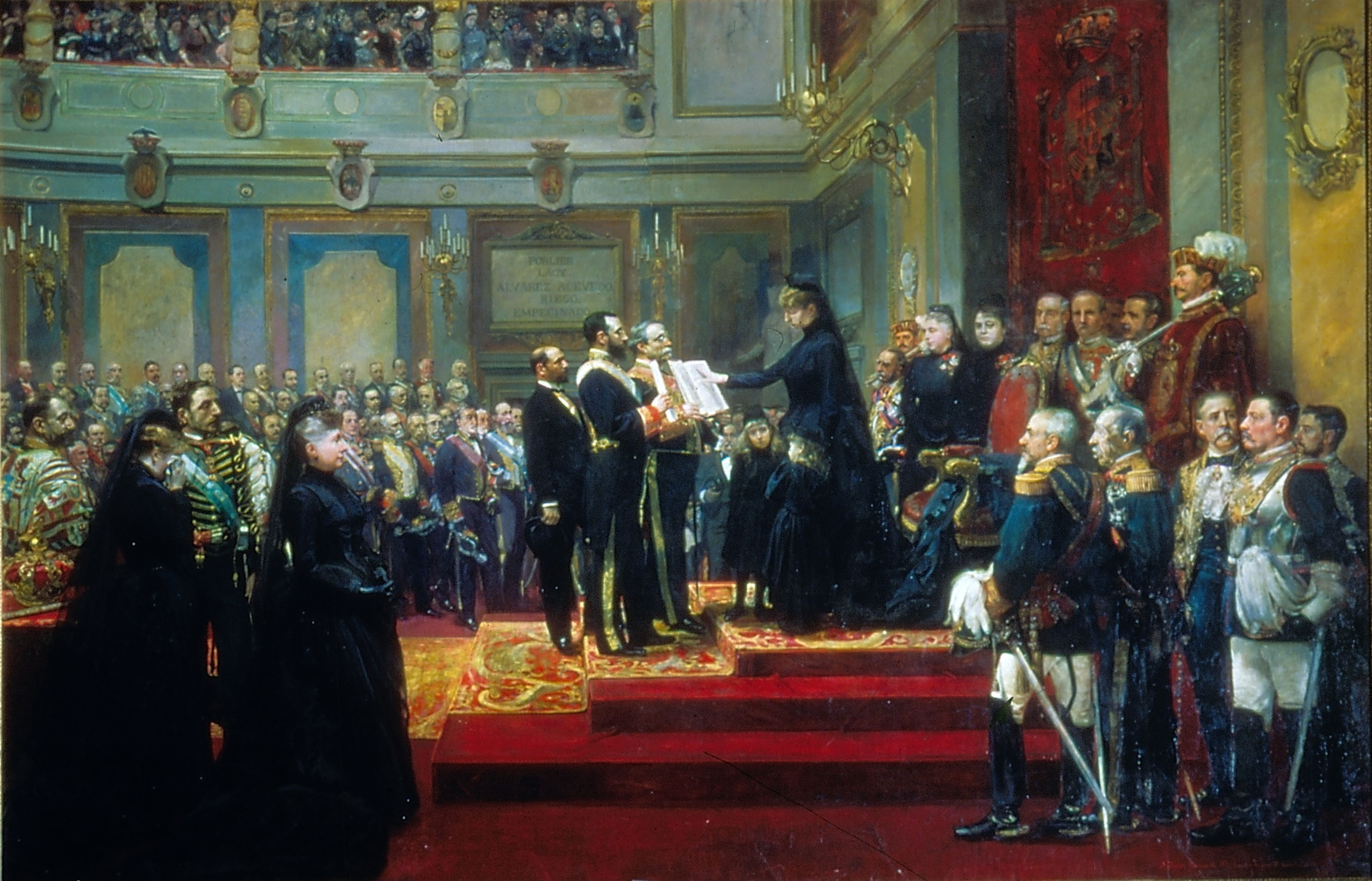
Painting depicting the oath of allegiance to the Constitution of 1876 by Maria Christina of Habsburg-Lorena at the ceremony of her proclamation as regent in December 1885. María Cristina, who is pregnant, is accompanied by her two daughters, María de las Mercedes de Borbón y Habsburgo-Lorena and María Teresa de Borbón. In front of her is the President of the Government, Antonio Cánovas del Castillo.

King Alfonso XII died on 25 November 1885 of tuberculosis, and his wife María Cristina de Habsburgo-Lorena took over the regency. The death of the king, with no male offspring —Alfonso and María Cristina, who had married on 29 November 1879, had had two daughters— and with a third child to be born, as the queen was three months pregnant, created great uncertainty about the future of the Restoration regime, which had only ten years to live, as the supposed "power vacuum" could be exploited by the Carlists or the Republicans to put an end to it. In fact, in September 1886, just four months after the birth of the future Alfonso XIII, a republican uprising led by General Manuel Villacampa del Castillo and organised from exile by Manuel Ruiz Zorrilla was the last military attempt by the republicans, the failure of which deeply affected it.

The leaders of the two parties of the time, Antonio Cánovas del Castillo for the Conservative Party and Práxedes Mateo Sagasta for the Liberal-Fusionist Party, met to agree on the replacement of the former by the latter at the head of the government. This was known as the "Pardo Pact", because although in reality the meeting of the party leaders took place at the seat of the Presidency of the Government and not at the Palacio del Pardo, the term is justified because the last residence of Alfonso XII was of decisive importance. It was there that the Restoration General, Martínez Campos, who arrived an hour after the Regent, was summoned, and who already had a solution to the crisis, following his many meetings since the start of the King's illness: two with Cánovas, who requested it, with Sagasta, with Generals Jovellar, Concha and Quesada, in a previous "military pact"; in fact Cánovas himself confessed that it was Martínez Campos' support that had led him to accept the liberal government. Many meetings and agreements were held at El Pardo; all the ministers and Sagasta arrived there; the most representative generals arrived there; the Nuncio was spoken to in order to facilitate the "pact" with the Church. Martínez Campos and the "other" pacts of El Pardo. This made possible the "benevolence" of the conservatives towards Sagasta's new liberal government so that it could develop the programme that had just been agreed by the various factions that made it up, known as the Law of Guarantees, which consisted essentially of introducing the freedoms and rights recognised during the democratic Sexenio —the pact included the definitive acceptance by the liberals of the 1876 Constitution and the shared sovereignty of the king and the Courts, on which the Constitution was based—. However, the faction of the Conservative Party headed by Francisco Romero Robledo did not accept the cession of power to Sagasta and left the party to form its own, called the Liberal-Reformist Party, which was joined by José López Domínguez's Izquierda Dinástica, in an attempt to create an intermediate political space between the two parties of the time.

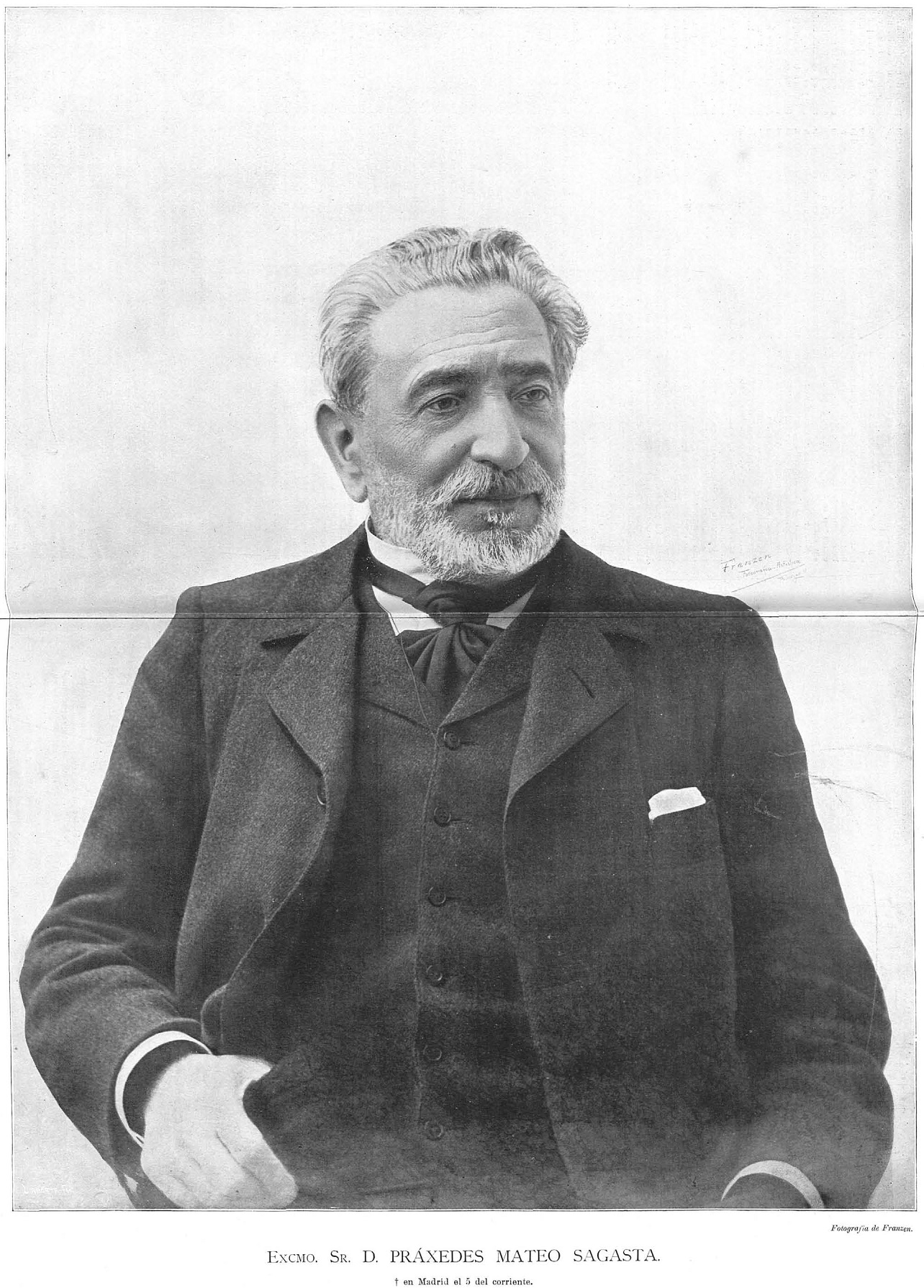
Práxedes Mateo Sagasta, leader of the Liberal-Fusionist Party.

In April 1886, five months after forming the government and one month before the birth of the future Alfonso XIII, the liberals called elections to gain a solid majority in the Courts and thus be able to develop their government programme, although they had already been able to begin to implement it thanks to the benevolence of the conservatives. This period was known as the Long Government of Sagasta or the Long Parliament because of its duration, almost five years, during which "a series of reforms were carried out that definitively shaped the social and political profile of the Restoration as a historical epoch", which is why some historians have considered it the "most fruitful period" of the Restoration. The first major reform of Sagasta's Long government was the approval in June 1887 of the Law of Associations, which regulated freedom of association for the purposes of "human freedom" and allowed workers' organisations to operate legally, as it included trade union freedom, which gave a great boost to the workers' movement in Spain. Under the protection of the new law, the anarcho-syndicalist FTRE, founded in 1881 as the successor to the FRE-AIT of the Sexenio Democrático, spread, and the socialist Unión General de Trabajadores (UGT) was born, founded in 1888, the same year in which the Spanish Socialist Workers' Party (PSOE), which had been born underground nine years earlier, was able to hold its First Congress.

The second major reform was the law of the jury, an old demand of progressive liberalism that had always been resisted by conservatism, and which was approved in April 1888. Trial by jury was established for those crimes that had the greatest impact on the maintenance of social order or that affected individual rights, such as freedom of the press. According to the law, the jury would be in charge of establishing the proven facts, while the legal qualification of the facts would be the responsibility of the judges.

The third major reform was the introduction of universal (male) suffrage by a law passed on 30 June 1890. This satisfied a long-standing demand of the liberal and democratic left and was a "political event". However, the extension of suffrage to all men over the age of twenty-five —some five million in 1890— regardless of their income, as was the case with census suffrage, did not democratise the political system, because electoral fraud continued, only now the cacique networks were extended to the population as a whole, so that governments continued to be formed before the elections, and not after, since the government of the turn was able to build up a solid majority in the Courts with the encasillado —during the Restoration, no government ever lost an election—. Thus, "although formally it amounted to the establishment of democracy, [the approval of universal (male) suffrage] in practical terms made no difference". Moreover, the Constitution was not reformed, so that the principle of national sovereignty was still not recognised, and only one third of the Senate was elected, nor was freedom of religion, another of the principles of a democratic system, recognised.

On the other hand, proof that the aim of the law was not to establish democracy lies in the fact that no guarantees were adopted to ensure the transparency of suffrage and thus prevent electoral fraud, such as the updating of the census by an independent body, the requirement of accreditation for the person who was going to vote or the control of the whole process, which remained in the hands of the Minister of the Interior, known as the "great elector", as it was he who ensured that his government had a large majority in the Courts. "The fact that in some urban centres the opposition was able to reverse this reality is almost a testimonial fact. Political control from above, the practice of the turn by means of electoral fraud, is what constitutes the essence of political practices in Spain at the end of the century", concludes Manuel Suárez Cortina.

=== Stabilisation of the political regime of the Restoration (1890–1895) ===
The first half of the last decade of the 19th century was the period of "fullness" of the political regime of the Restoration established by Antonio Cánovas del Castillo after the Democratic Sexenio. After these five years of relative stability, during which the shift between conservatives and liberals was normalised, the regime had to face "several problems that were not on its political agenda: the workers' problem, the crystallisation of a peripheral nationalism and, finally, the colonial question itself, which led first to the Cuban War of Independence and then to the Spanish-American war, the defeat that marked the final crisis of the century".

==== Conservative government of Cánovas del Castillo (1890–1892) ====
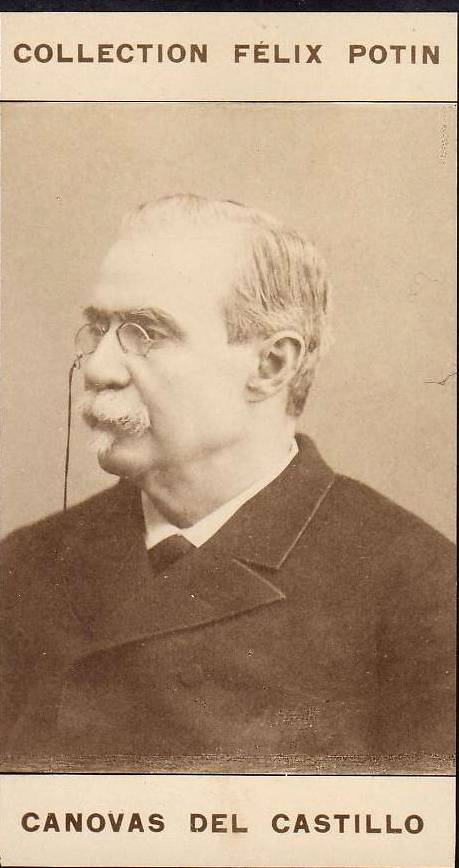
Antonio Cánovas del Castillo, leader of the Conservative Party and architect of the political regime of the Restoration, also known as the Canovist system.

His programme of reforms having culminated with the approval of universal (male) suffrage, Sagasta transferred to Cánovas del Castillo, who formed a government in July 1890, only a few weeks after the law had been passed in the Courts. The new government did not modify the reforms introduced by the liberals, which, according to Suárez Cortina, "thus sealed a basic feature of the Canovist system: liberal advances were respected by conservatism, so that the regime was consolidated on the basis of a balance between conservation and progress". Therefore, it was the Cánovas government that presided over the first elections by universal suffrage held in February 1891, in which the machinery of fraud was once again at work and the conservatives obtained a large majority in the Congress of Deputies (253 seats, compared with 74 for the liberals and 31 for the republicans).

Two tendencies of conservatism coexisted in the government, embodied by Francisco Romero Robledo, who had rejoined the party ranks after his failed experience with the Liberal-Reformist Party, and Francisco Silvela. The former represented "the dominance of clientelistic practices, electoral manipulation and the triumph of the crudest pragmatism", as opposed to the "conservative reformism" of the latter. Cánovas del Castillo leaned more towards Romero Robledo's "pragmatism", so Silvela left the government in November 1891 and would not be able to put his reformist programme into practice until after Cánovas' death and the "disaster of '98".

The most important measure taken by the government was the so-called Arancel Cánovas of 1891, which repealed the free-trade Arancel Figuerola of 1869 and established strong protectionist measures for the Spanish economy, which were complemented by the approval the following year of the Ley de Relaciones Comerciales con las Antillas (in English: Law on Commercial Relations with the West Indies). With this tax, the government met the demands of certain economic sectors —such as the Catalan textile industry— as well as joining the international trend in favour of protectionism to the detriment of free trade. During Cánovas' government, the IV Centenary of the Discovery of America was celebrated, but there were also two events of great importance for the future. The birth of the Unió Catalanista, the first fully political organisation of Catalan nationalism, which in 1892 approved its founding document, the Bases de Manresa, and the publication that same year of Sabino Arana's book Bizkaya por su independencia, which represented the birth certificate of Basque nationalism.

==== Return of the liberals to power (1893–1895): Anarchist terrorism ====
In December 1892, a case of corruption in the Madrid City Council provoked a crisis in the Cánovas government, which the regent solved by calling Sagasta back to power. Sagasta, in accordance with the Canovist system, obtained a decree to dissolve the Parliament and call new elections to obtain a broad majority to support the new government. The elections were held in March 1893 and, as expected, were a resounding triumph for the government candidates (the Liberals won 281 deputies, compared with 61 for the Conservatives —divided between the Canovists, 44, and the Silvelists, 17— plus 7 Carlists, 14 Republican Possibilists and 33 Republican Unionists).

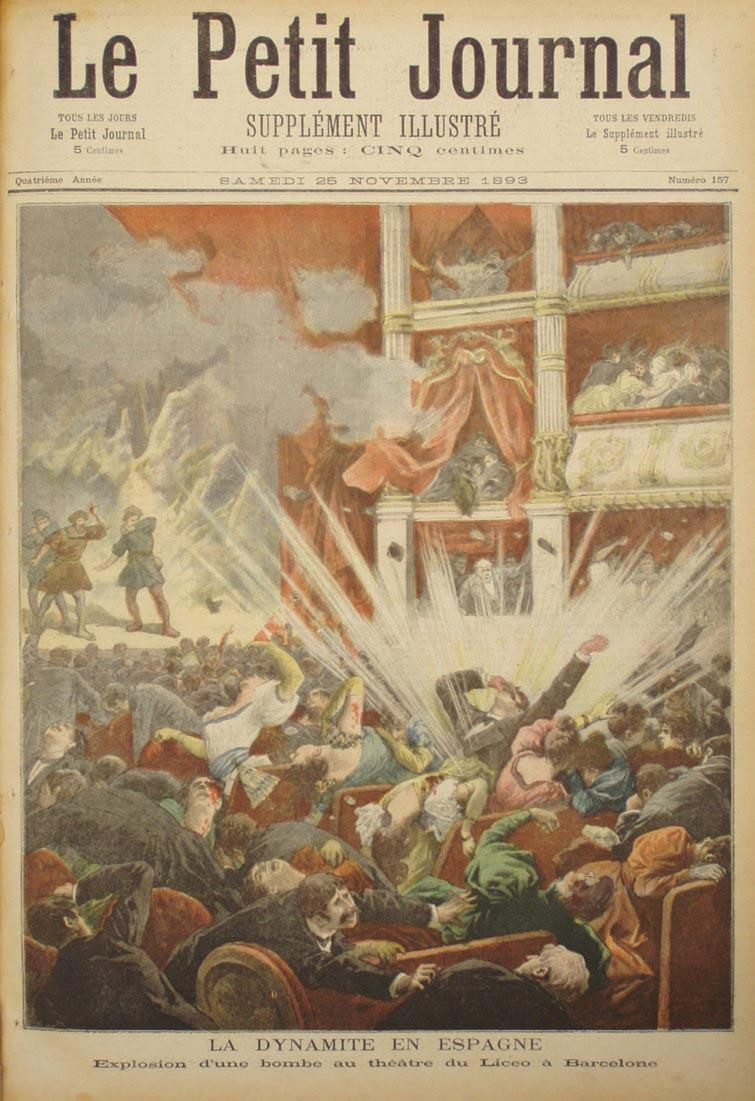
Front page of Le Petit Journal on the bombing of the Liceu by an anarchist on 7 November 1893, which killed 22 people and injured 35.

The most prominent figures in the new government were Germán Gamazo, leader of the right wing of the Liberal Party, and his son-in-law Antonio Maura. The former held the Treasury portfolio, but his goal of achieving a balanced budget was frustrated by the increase in spending caused by the brief Margallo war that took place around Melilla between October 1893 and April 1894. The second, at the head of the Ministry of Overseas Territories, set in motion the reform of the colonial and municipal regime in the Philippines to give them greater administrative autonomy —despite the opposition it aroused among certain sectors of Spanish nationalism and the Church— but failed in his attempt to do the same in Cuba, because the Spanish Constitutional Union found it too advanced, while it did not satisfy the aspirations of the Cuban Autonomist Liberal Party. The colonial reform project for Cuba was rejected by the Cortes, branded as unpatriotic, and Antonio Maura came to be described as a filibuster, a fool and a energumen. Maura and his father-in-law Germán Gamazo resigned, opening up a serious crisis in Sagasta's government.

The government had to face the anarchist terrorism of "propaganda by the deed" justified by its supporters as a response to the "violence of bourgeois society and the bourgeois state". Its main stage was the city of Barcelona, and the first major attack took place on 24 September 1893, in which General Arsenio Martínez Campos, Captain General of Catalonia, was slightly wounded, but one person was killed and others injured. The perpetrator of the attack, the young anarchist Paulino Pallás —who was shot two weeks later— justified it as a reprisal for the incidents that had occurred a year and a half earlier in Jerez de la Frontera when, on the night of 8 January 1892, some 500 peasants tried to take over the city to free some comrades imprisoned in jail and two neighbours and one of the assailants were killed, This was followed by indiscriminate repression of the workers' organisations in the town —four workers were executed after a court martial, and sixteen more were sentenced to life imprisonment; all of them denounced that they had been tortured to extract confessions. The following month, on 7 November, a bomb thrown into the stalls of the Liceu Theatre in Barcelona killed 22 people and injured 35 others.

=== Crisis at the end of the century (1895–1902) ===
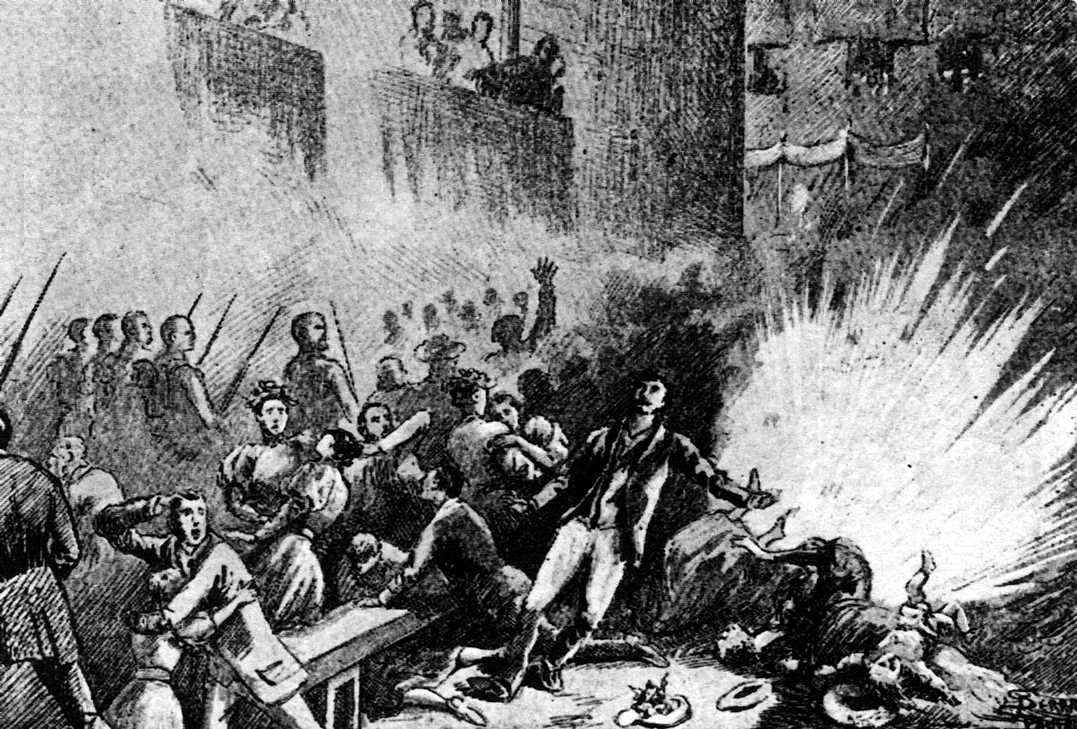
Drawing of the bomb explosion during the Corpus Christi procession in 1896 in Carrer Canvis Nous in Barcelona. The subsequent repression known as the Montjuic trial raised a wave of national and international protest.

The final crisis of the Restoration century was determined by the Cuban War of Independence that began in February 1895, the first consequence of which was the fall of the liberal government of Sagasta, which was replaced by a conservative government presided over by Antonio Cánovas del Castillo. But anarchist terrorism also played a certain role internally, with the most important attack taking place in Barcelona on 7 June 1896 during the Corpus Christi procession in Canvis Nous Street, in which six people died on the spot and another forty-two were injured. The police repression that followed was brutal and indiscriminate and culminated in the famous Montjuic trial, during which 400 "suspects" were imprisoned in Montjuic Castle, where they were brutally tortured —"nails pulled out, feet crushed by presses, electric helmets, cigars extinguished on the skin..."—. In several martial courts, 28 people were sentenced to death and 59 others to life imprisonment.

The Montjuic trial had great international repercussions, given the doubts about the evidence relied on for the convictions —basically the confessions of the accused obtained under torture – which was also followed by a press campaign against the government and the "executioners". This campaign was led by the young journalist Alejandro Lerroux, editor of the Madrid republican daily El País, which published the stories of the tortured for months under the title Las infamias de Montjuïc (The infamies of Montjuïc) —this also embarked on a propaganda tour in La Mancha and Andalusia—. It was in this exalted atmosphere of protest at the Montjuic trials that the assassination of the president of the government, Antonio Cánovas del Castillo, by the Italian anarchist Michele Angiolillo took place on 8 August 1897. Práxedes Mateo Sagasta had to take over the government.

==== Cuban War (1895–1898) ====
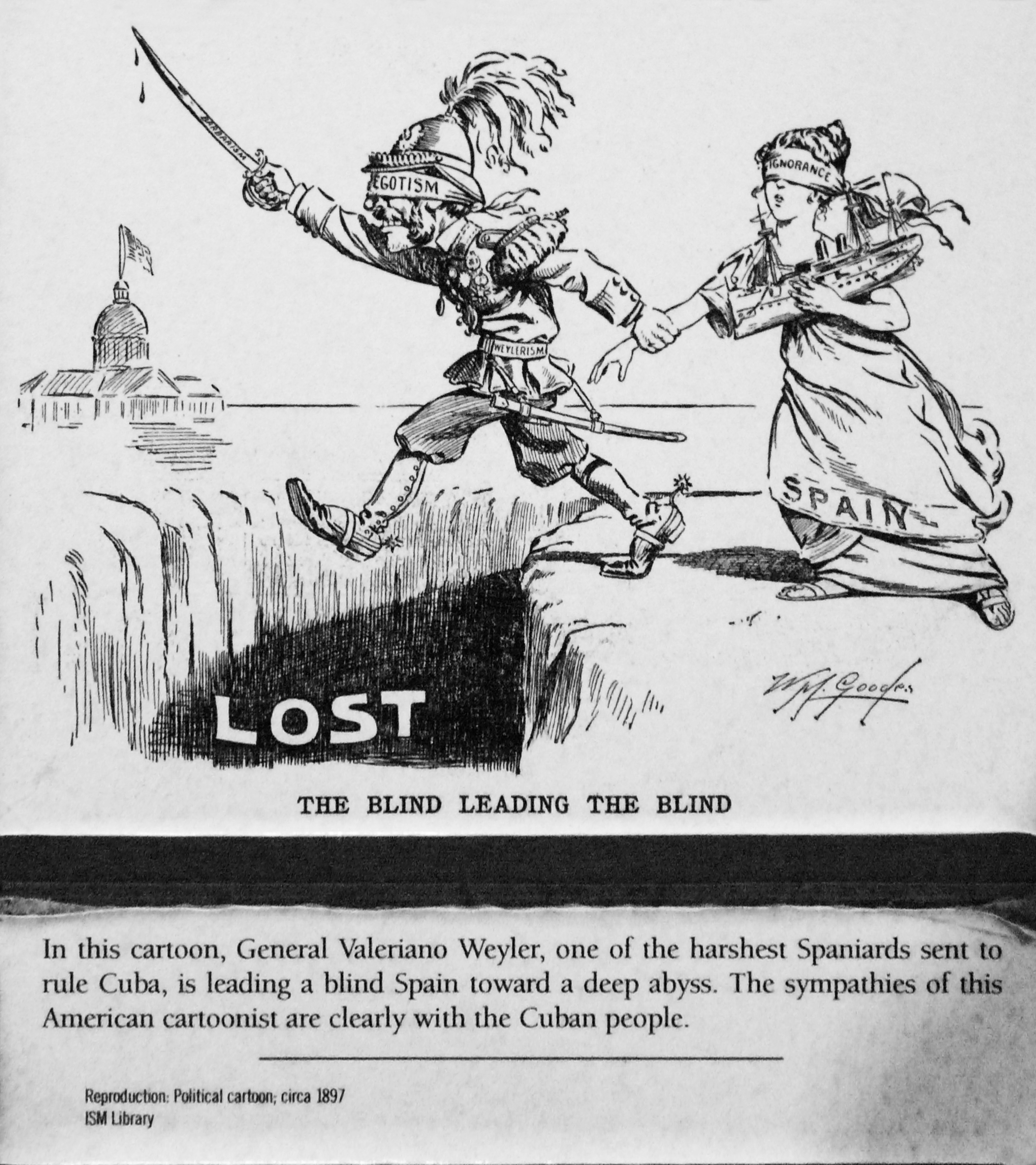
American satirical caricature of General Valeriano Weyler's actions in the Cuban War, entitled The Blind Man Leading the Blind.

On the last Sunday in February 1895, a new pro-independence insurrection broke out in Cuba led by the Cuban Revolutionary Party, founded by José Martí in New York in 1892, thus putting an end to the truce opened by the Peace of Zanjón. The Spanish government reacted by sending a large military contingent to the island —some 220,000 soldiers were to arrive in Cuba in three years—. In January 1896 General Valeriano Weyler relieved General Arsenio Martínez Campos —who had failed to put an end to the insurrection— of his command, determined to carry the war "to the last man and the last peseta". "Weyler decided that it was necessary to cut off the support that the independence fighters were receiving from Cuban society; and to this end he ordered the rural population to concentrate in villages controlled by the Spanish forces; at the same time he ordered the destruction of crops and livestock that could be used to supply the enemy. These measures worked well from a military point of view, but at a very high human cost. The population, which had been re-concentrated and lacked sanitary conditions and adequate food, began to fall victim to disease and to die in large numbers. On the other hand, many peasants, with nothing left to lose, joined the insurgent army".

Meanwhile, in 1896, another independence insurrection began in the Philippine archipelago led by the Katipunan, a nationalist organisation founded in 1892. Unlike in Cuba, the rebellion was stopped in 1897, although General Polavieja resorted to methods similar to those of Weyler —José Rizal, the leading Filipino nationalist intellectual, was executed—.

In August 1897 Cánovas was assassinated, and Sagasta, the leader of the Liberal Party, had to take over the government in October. One of the first decisions he took was to dismiss General Weyler, whose hard-line policy was not working, and he was replaced by General Ramón Blanco y Erenas. Likewise, in a last attempt to reduce support for the insurrection, Cuba was granted political autonomy —as was Puerto Rico, which remained at peace— but it came too late and the war continued.

==== Spanish-American War: the "Disaster of '98" ====
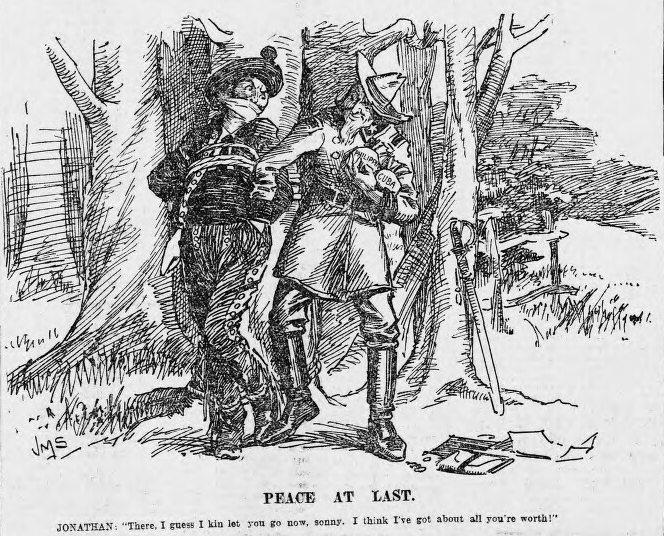
American satirical cartoon about the 1898 Treaty of Paris, which was signed after the Spanish defeat in the Spanish-American War and ended the last remnants of the Spanish Empire.

Besides the geopolitical and strategic reasons, the American interest for Cuba —and for Puerto Rico— was due to the growing interdependence of their respective economies —investments of American capital; 80% of the Cuban sugar exports were already going to the United States— and also to the sympathy aroused by the Cuban independence cause among the public opinion, especially after the sensationalist press aired the brutal repression exercised by Weyler and started an anti-Spanish campaign asking for the intervention of the American army on the side of the insurrectionists. In fact, the American aid in arms and supplies canalized through the Cuban Council presided by Tomás Estrada Palma and the Cuban League "was decisive to prevent the subjugation of the Cuban guerrillas", according to Suárez Cortina. The American position was radicalized with the Republican President William McKinley, elected in November 1896, who discarded the autonomist solution admitted by his predecessor, the Democrat Grover Cleveland, and clearly opted for Cuba's independence or annexation —the American ambassador in Madrid made an offer to buy the island which was rejected by the Spanish government—. Thus, the granting of autonomy to Cuba approved by the government of Sagasta —the first experience of this type in contemporary Spanish history— did not satisfy at all the North American pretensions, nor those of the Cuban independence soldiers who continued the war.

In February 1898 the American battleship Maine sank in the port of Havana where it was anchored as a result of an explosion —264 sailors and two officers died— and two months later the United States Congress passed a resolution demanding Spain's independence from Cuba and authorized President McKinley to declare war, which he did on April 25.

The Spanish-American war was brief and was settled at sea. On May 1, 1898, the Spanish squadron in the Philippines was sunk off the coast of Cavite by an American fleet —and the disembarked American troops occupied Manila three and a half months later— and on July 3 the same thing happened to the fleet sent to Cuba under the command of Admiral Cervera off the coast of Santiago de Cuba —a few days later Santiago de Cuba, the second most important city on the island, fell into the hands of the American troops that had disembarked—. Shortly afterwards, the Americans occupied the neighboring island of Puerto Rico.

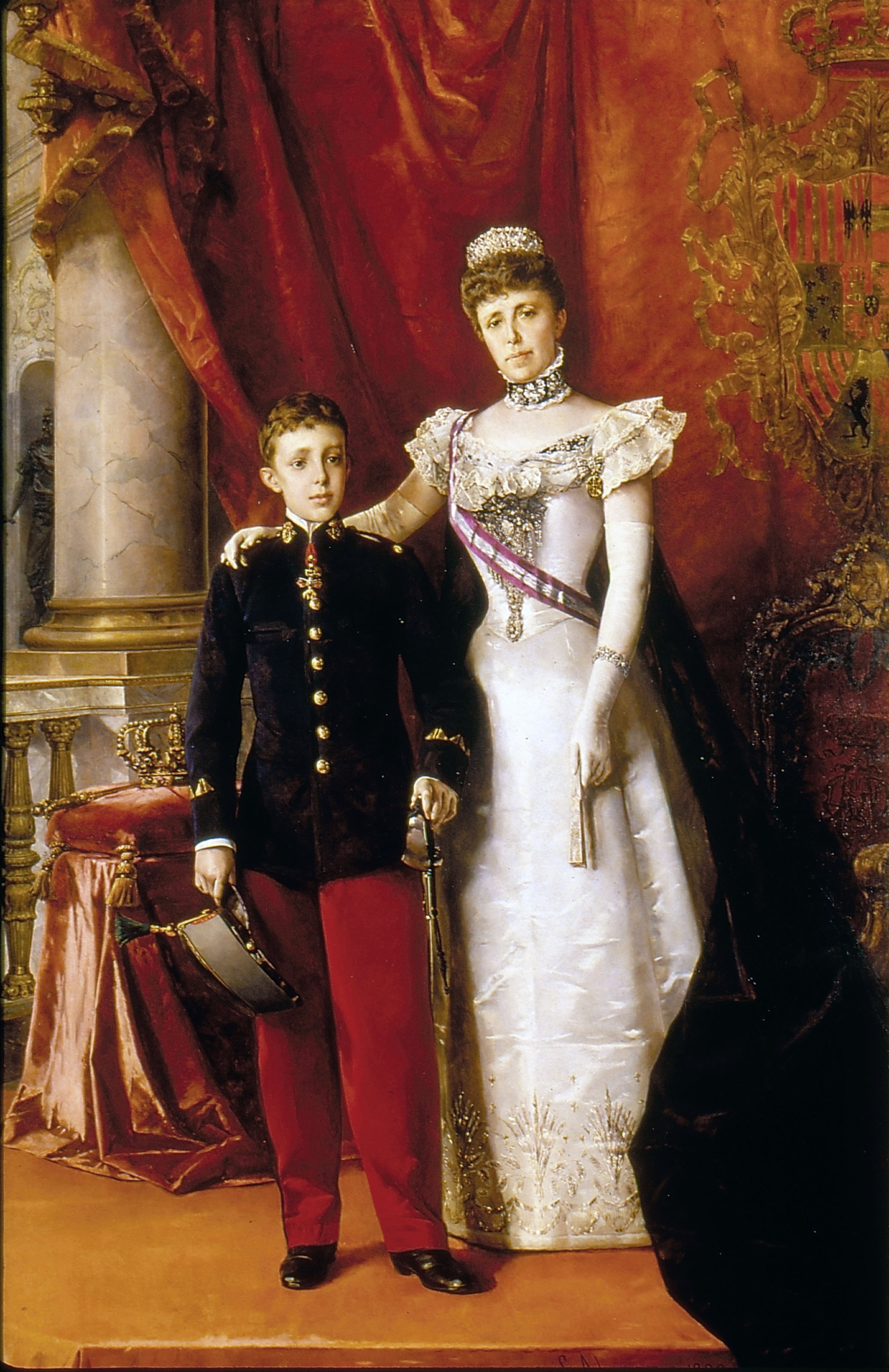
The regent María Cristina de Habsburgo-Lorena with her son the future Alfonso XIII, twelve years old. Painting by Luis Álvarez Catalá, 1898.

Immediately the government of Sagasta requested the mediation of France to initiate peace negotiations that culminated with the signature of the Treaty of Paris, on December 10, 1898. By this Treaty, Spain recognized the independence of Cuba and ceded to the United States, Puerto Rico, the Philippines and the island of Guam, in the Mariana Archipelago. The following year Spain sold to Germany for 25 million dollars the last remnants of its colonial empire in the Pacific, the Caroline Islands, the Marianas —minus Guam— and Palau. "Described as absurd and useless by much of historiography, the war against the U.S. was sustained by an internal logic, in the idea that it was not possible to maintain the monarchic regime if it was not based on a more than foreseeable military defeat," Suarez Cortina says. As the head of the Spanish delegation at the Paris peace negotiations, the liberal Eugenio Montero Ríos, said: "Everything has been lost, except the Monarchy". Or as the American ambassador in Madrid said: the politicians of the dynastic parties preferred "the probabilities of a war, with the certainty of losing Cuba, to the dethronement of the monarchy". After the defeat, the Spanish nationalist patriotic exaltation turned into a feeling of frustration. However, this feeling had no political translation since both Carlists and Republicans —with the exception of Pi y Margall who maintained an anti-colonialist stance— had supported the war and had manifested themselves as nationalist, militarist and colonialist as the parties of the day —only socialists and anarchists remained faithful to their internationalist, anti-colonialist and anti-war ideology—and the Restoration regime would manage to overcome the crisis.

==== "Regenerationist" governments (1898–1902) ====
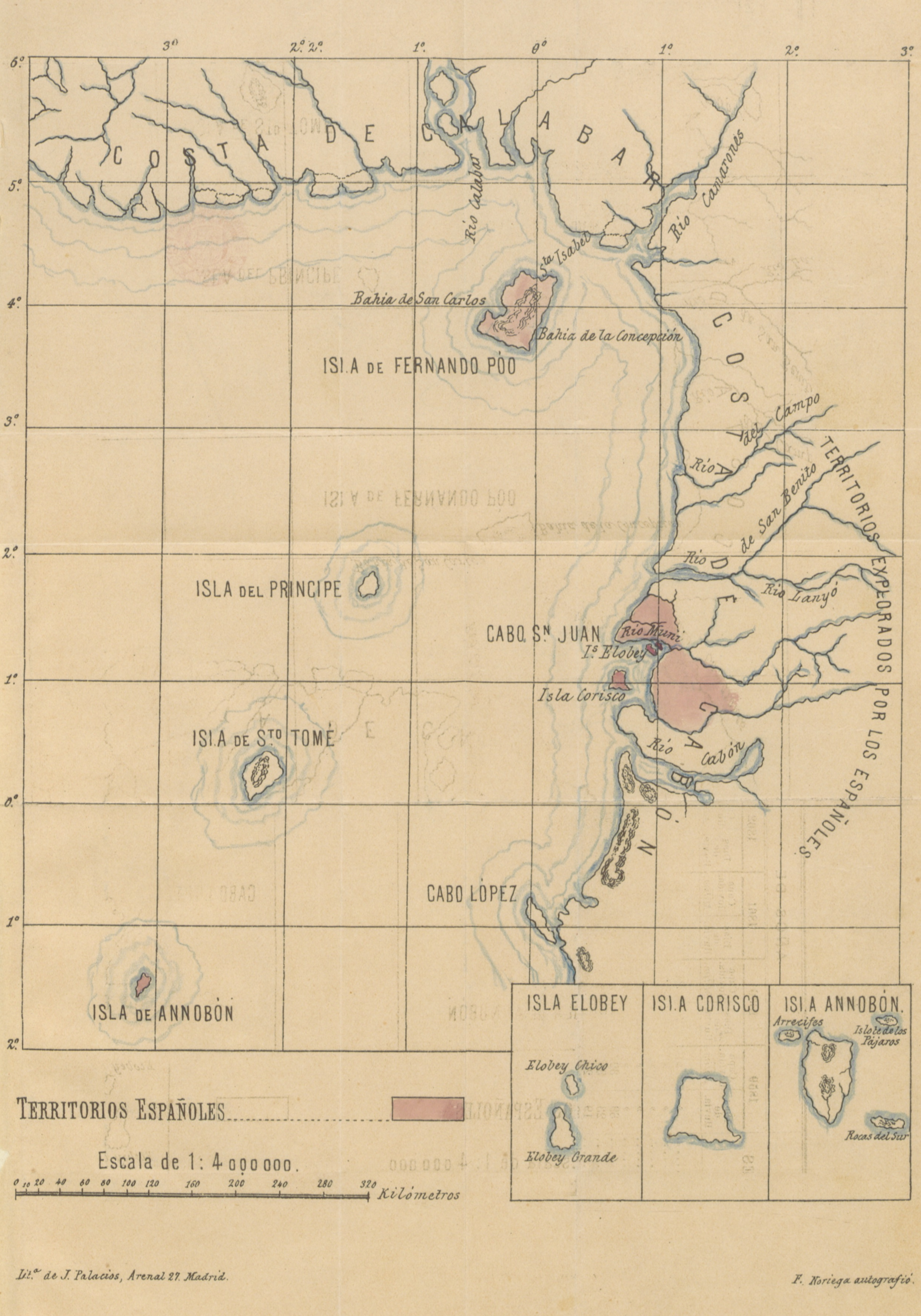
Map of the Spanish possessions in the Gulf of Guinea in 1897, before the Treaty of Paris of 1900 that would lead to the creation of Spanish Guinea, until it became independent in 1968 as Equatorial Guinea.

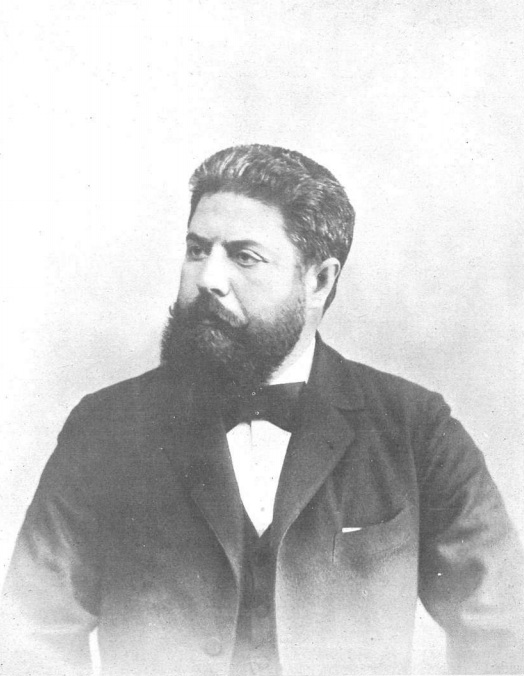
Joaquín Costa.

Joaquin Costa.The years at the end of the 19th century and the beginning of the 20th century were marked by regenerationism, a current of opinion that proposed the need to "vivify" —to regenerate— Spanish society so that the "disaster of '98" would not be repeated. This current participated fully in what was called the literature of Disaster, which had already begun some years before 98 —Lucas Mallada had published Los males de la Patria in 1890— and which set out to reflect on the causes that had led to the situation of "prostration" in which the Spanish Nation found itself —as demonstrated by the fact that Spain had lost its colonies while the rest of the main European States were building their own colonial empires— and on what had to be done to overcome it. Among the many works published were Ricardo Macías Picavea's El problema nacional (1899), Damián Isern's Del desastre nacional y sus causas (1900) and Dr. Madrazo's ¿El pueblo español ha muerto? (1903). Also participating in this debate on the "problem of Spain" were the writers of what years later would be called, precisely, the Generation of '98: Ángel Ganivet, Azorín, Miguel de Unamuno, Pío Baroja, Antonio Machado, Ramiro de Maeztu, and others.

But, undoubtedly, the most influential author of the regenerationist literature was Joaquín Costa. In 1901 he published Oligarquía y caciquismo, in which he pointed to the political system of the Restoration as the main cause of the "backwardness" of Spain. To "regenerate" the "sick organism" that was Spain in 1900, an "iron surgeon" was needed to put an end to the "oligarchic and cacique" system and promote a change based on "school and pantry".

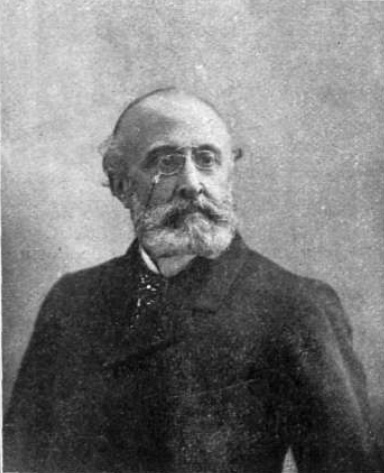
Francisco Silvela (1903), successor of Antonio Cánovas del Castillo at the head of the Conservative Party.

In March 1899 the new conservative leader, Francisco Silvela, took charge of the government, which was a great relief for Sagasta, who had been in charge of the State during the days of the disaster of 98. Silvela echoed the demands for the "regeneration" of society and the political system —he himself characterized the situation as that of a country "without a pulse"—, which was translated into a series of reformist measures. Silvela's project —and that of General Polavieja, Minister of War— consisted of "a conservative regeneration formula that tried to safeguard patriotic values at a time of national crisis".

The most important reform was the tax reform carried out by the Minister of Finance, Raimundo Fernández Villaverde, which was designed to face the difficult financial situation of the State as a consequence of the increase in public expenditure caused by the war and to stop the depreciation of the peseta and the rise in prices —with the consequent increase in popular discontent—.

The only important opposition movement that Silvela's conservative government had to face was the taxpayers' strike —or "tancament de caixes", literally 'closing of the cashboxes', in Catalonia— promoted between April and July 1900 by the National League of Producers, an organization created by the regenerationist Joaquín Costa, and by the Chambers of Commerce, directed by Basilio Paraíso. But this movement, which demanded political and economic changes, ended up failing and the National Union that emerged from it dissolved, especially when the Basque and Catalan bourgeoisies abandoned it and went on to support Silvela's government.

The internal disagreements —mainly the result of General Polavieja's opposition to the reduction of public spending imposed by Fernández Villaverde to achieve a balanced budget, since it clashed with his request for greater economic allocations to modernize the Army— were what ended up causing the fall of Silvela's government in October 1900. He was succeeded by General Marcelo Azcárraga Palmero, with a government that only lasted five months. In March 1901 the liberal Sagasta returned to preside over the government that would be the last of the Regency of María Cristina de Habsburgo-Lorena and the first of the effective reign of Alfonso XIII.

== Constitutional period of the personal reign of Alfonso XIII (1902–1923) ==
=== First years (1902–1907): Division of the parties of the time and interventionism of the king ===
When Alfonso XIII, at the age of sixteen, acceded to the throne in May 1902, the government was presided over by Práxedes Mateo Sagasta, the elderly leader of the Liberal Party, one of the two parties in power together with the Conservative Party. He remained in power until December of that year —Sagasta would die a month after leaving office, at the age of 77— and was succeeded at the head of the government by another veteran politician, Francisco Silvela, 60 years old, leader of the Conservative Party since the assassination in 1897 of Antonio Cánovas del Castillo. As was the custom in the political regime of the Restoration when there was a changeover between the two parties in power, the president obtained a decree from the king to dissolve the Courts and called elections, which were held in April 1903 to obtain a large majority in the Courts. Silvela promised that the elections would be sincere, although without risking the conservative majority, which allowed the coalition republican parties to obtain a resounding triumph in several capitals, such as Madrid, Barcelona and Valencia. This relative Republican success exacerbated tensions within the Conservative Party, so that "Silvela, a tired man, could not stand the pressure and after the first of the so-called oriental crises (traditionally believed to be due to the mention of the place where, in any case, all changes of government took place at the time, the Royal Palace, but which actually has a deeper meaning, since it alludes to the "oriental" way in which crises originating in the royal whim are carried out, in the style of the oriental despots, in Montesquieu's classic distinction between monarchy and despotism), he resigned the presidency of the government and the leadership of the conservative party".

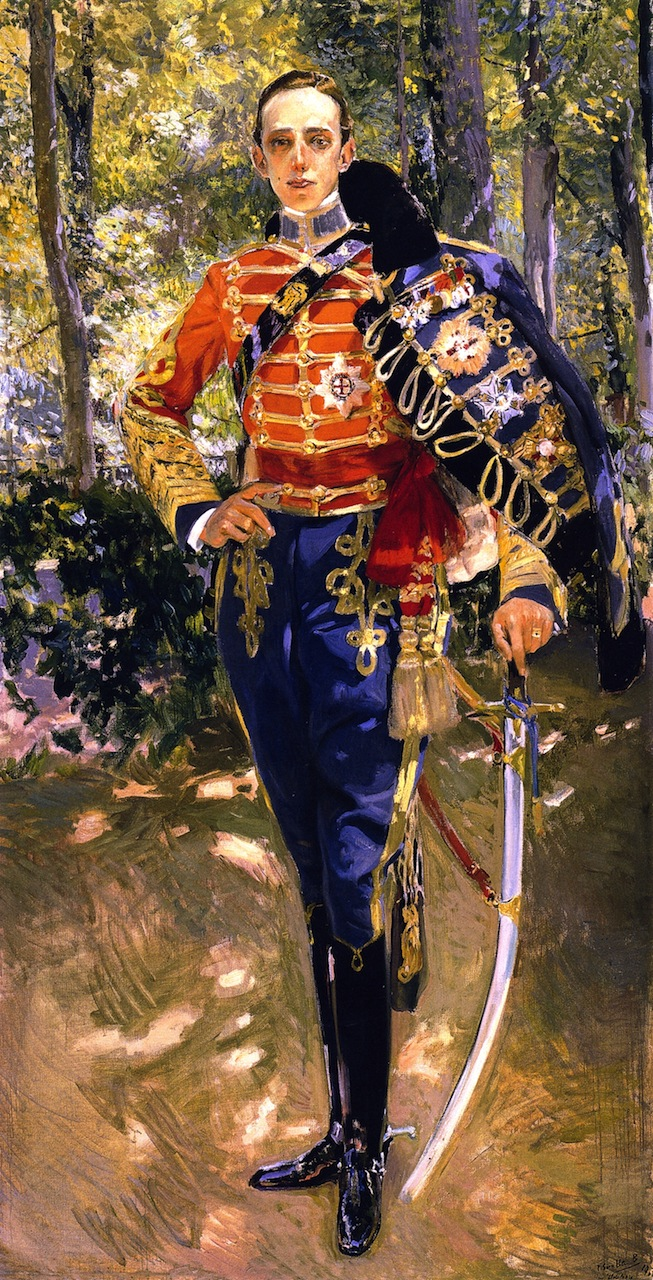
Portrait of Alfonso XIII in hussar uniform, by Joaquín Sorolla (1907).

The disappearance of the historical leaders unleashed the struggle between the various factions that made up both the liberal and conservative parties for leadership. In the Conservative Party, the faction headed by Raimundo Fernández Villaverde, who had succeeded Silvela at the head of the government, clashed with the faction headed by Antonio Maura, who in December 1903 replaced him. The division within the Liberal Party was even greater, since there were up to five aspirants to succeed Sagasta, Eugenio Montero Ríos, José López Domínguez, Francisco Romero Robledo, Segismundo Moret and José Canalejas. The result was a weakening of the parties, although the turn was not altered. The Conservative Party governed between 1903 and 1905 and the Liberal Party between 1905 and 1907, but these were years of great instability. During the Conservative period there were "five total crises [of government] with the transition through the government of four different presidents and no less than 66 ministers". During the year and a half that the Liberals were in power there were five governments.

During these years there was a growing interventionism of the new king in political life, provoking friction between the Crown and the governments, causing criticism from a certain sector of the press. In mid 1903, El Heraldo de Madrid published: "It would seem that there is the purpose of demonstrating that in Spain there is no more power than that of the royal will, that today it leans to the left and tomorrow to the right, not according to the results of the parliamentary debates... but according to the advice given and the winds that blow in spheres that are not strictly constitutional and parliamentary". Thus when in December 1903 the conservative Antonio Maura came to the government, the Republicans spoke of a new "oriental" crisis, adding that it had had "feminine" touches, alluding to the alleged intervention of the queen mother, the former regent María Cristina de Habsburgo-Lorena.

The first important case of interventionism in the political life of Alfonso XIII took place in December 1904, when he refused to endorse the proposal for the appointment of the Army Chief of Staff, forcing the president of the government Antonio Maura to resign afterwards.

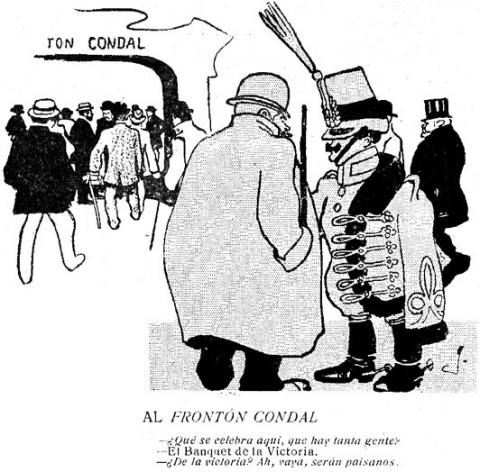
This cartoon appeared in the satirical magazine ¡Cu-Cut! which provoked the wrath of the military and the caption reads: AL FRONTÓN CONDAL: "What is being celebrated here, that there are so many people?" "- The Victory Banquet." "Of the Victory? Oh, well, they must be fellow countrymen."

The interventionism of the Crown became even more evident on the occasion of the events of the ¡Cu-Cut! On November 25, 1905, a group of officers assaulted in Barcelona the editorial office of the satirical Catalanist weekly "¡Cu-Cut!" for the publication of a cartoon that ironized about the defeats of the Spanish army. The editorial office of another Catalanist publication, the newspaper La Veu de Catalunya, was also attacked. The liberal government of Eugenio Montero Ríos tried to impose its authority over the military and agreed not to give in to the pressure of the general captains who showed their support to the insurrectionist officers, but the monarch finally did not back the government and supported the attitude of the Army, which forced Montero Ríos to resign.

The new government presided over by the other liberal leader Segismundo Moret, who received the king's order to prevent a repetition of the attacks "on the Army and the symbols of the Fatherland", set out to satisfy the military —he appointed General Agustín Luque, one of the captain generals who had most applauded the assault on the ¡Cu-Cut!— and quickly had the Courts approve the Law for the Repression of Crimes against the Fatherland and the Army —known as the "Law of Jurisdictions"— by which from that moment on the competencies to judge them passed to the military jurisdiction.

According to the historian Santos Juliá, "the government yielded to the army thanks to the weight that the Crown placed on the military saucer, with a far-reaching result: the Courts approved the Law, with which they created a sphere of autonomous military power and set the precedent of yielding to military insubordination. The militarization of public order had taken a giant step forward with this Law". According to historian Borja de Riquer, "by tolerating the insubordination of the military in Barcelona, the monarch had left the political system exposed to new pressures and blackmail, which considerably weakened the supremacy of civilian power in the face of militarism".

In response to the impunity of those responsible for the events of the ¡Cu-Cut! and to the Law of Jurisdictions, a coalition of parties was formed in Catalonia in May 1906 called Catalan Solidarity, presided over by the old republican Nicolás Salmerón, which included the republicans —except the party of Alejandro Lerroux—the Catalanists —the Regionalist League, the Catalanist Union and the Republican Nationalist Center, a splinter group of the Lliga a few months earlier—, and even the Catalan Carlists. His successes were spectacular, with massive demonstrations such as the one held in Barcelona on May 20, 1906, which drew 200,000 people. In the general elections of 1907 he obtained an overwhelming triumph, winning 41 deputies out of the 44 that corresponded to Catalonia. After his victory in the elections, as Borja de Riquer has pointed out, "nothing would be the same in Catalan political life, and the governments in Madrid, and the crown itself, would have to accept the fact that the Catalan question had become one of the most worrying problems in Spanish political life".

=== "Long government" of Antonio Maura (1907–1909) ===
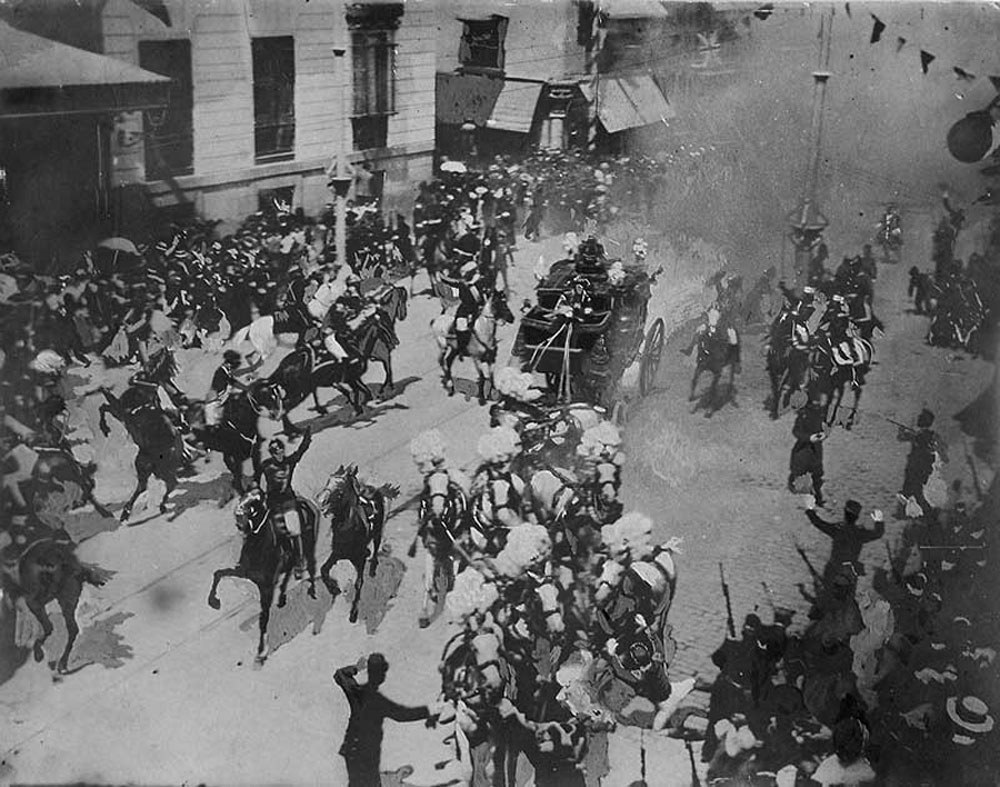
Historical photograph of seconds after the assassination attempt against king Alfonso XIII and Victoria Eugenia de Battenberg on their wedding day, May 31, 1906. The historian Manuel Suárez Cortina relates the fall of the government of the liberal Segismundo Moret with this attack, the work of the anarchist Mateo Morral, and from which the king and queen were unharmed.

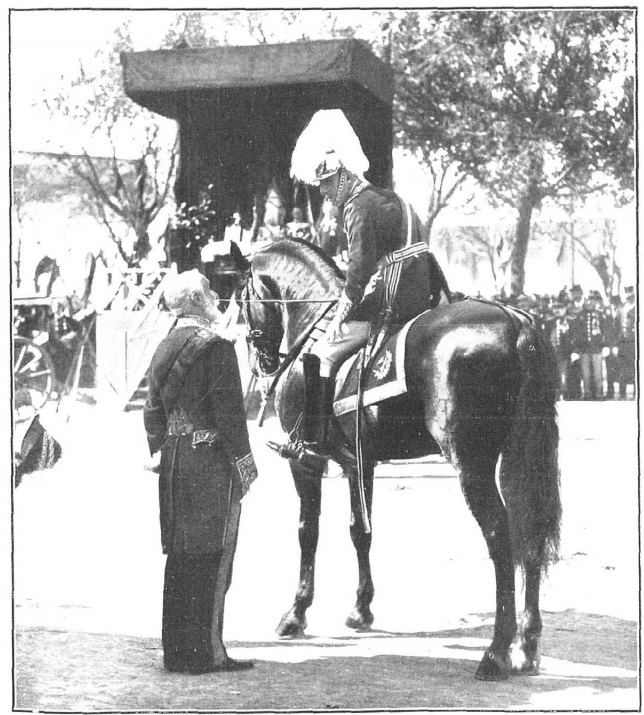
Maura conversing with the monarch in April 1909; photograph by Campúa.

The approval of the Law of Jurisdictions opened a crisis within the Liberal Party, ending with the resignation of Segismundo Moret as head of the government in July 1906. He was followed by three other presidents of Liberal governments, but the disagreements between the factions of the party continued, so in January 1907 the King called upon the leader of the Conservative Party, Antonio Maura, to form a government. Following the customs of the political regime of the Restoration, Antonio Maura received a decree from Alfonso XIII to dissolve the Courts and call for new elections to obtain a broad majority in Parliament. On the other hand, the great novelty of the elections was the overwhelming triumph in Catalonia of the Catalan Solidarity coalition, which obtained 41 deputies out of the 44 that corresponded to it.

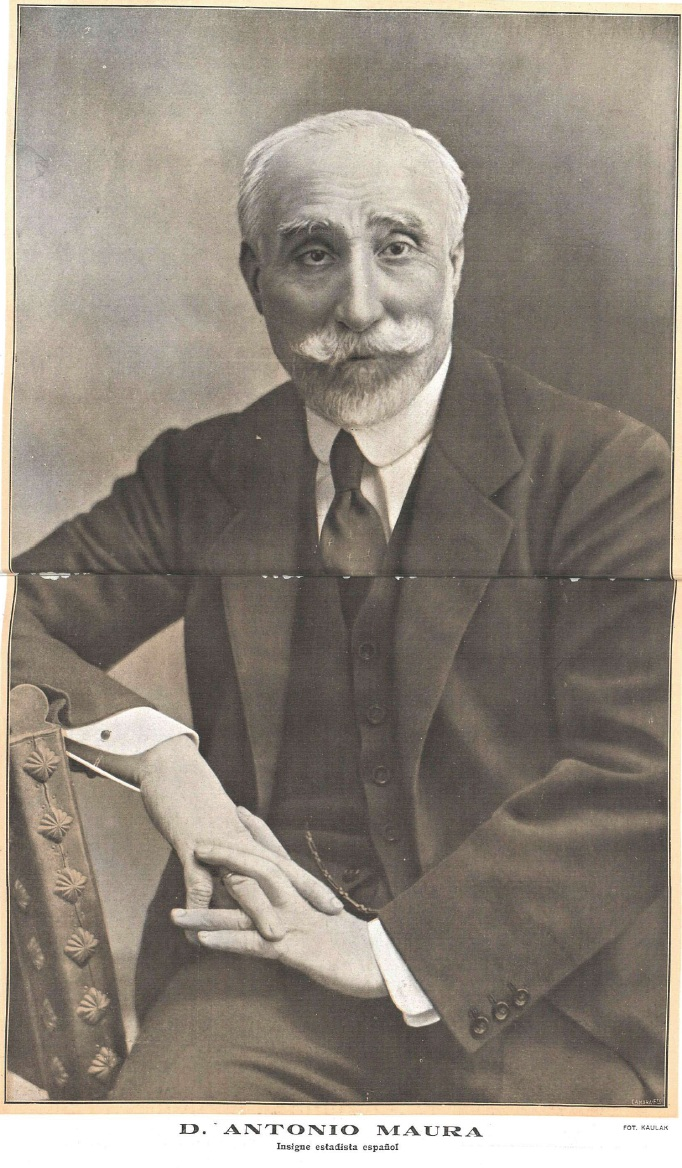
Antonio Maura.

Between 1907 and 1909, Maura set in motion the so-called "revolution from above" of the Restoration regime —that is to say, the reform of the political regime from the institutions and on the initiative of the government itself— whose essential purpose was to obtain popular support for the monarchy of Alfonso XIII, putting an end to the cacique system. According to Javier Moreno Luzón, Maura was "convinced that, in a rural and essentially Catholic country like Spain, this opening, controlled if necessary with the reinforcement of repressive mechanisms, would benefit the crown, the Church and the established social order, that is to say, conservative interests".

The first piece of his "revolution from above" was the new electoral law passed in August 1907, whereby the town councils ceased to control the electoral process, now in the hands of the Central Census Board, and in which the electoral crime was typified and passed to the jurisdiction of the Supreme Court. On the other hand, compulsory voting was introduced to encourage participation in the elections and in article 29 it was established that they would not be held in those electoral districts in which only one candidate was presented, who would be automatically proclaimed. All these measures were intended to put an end to electoral fraud.

However, Maura's declared intention that the new electoral law would allow for "honest" elections was not fulfilled since he did not renounce the uninominal districts, the basis of the system for the classification of deputies that assured the triumph of the party in government. Moreover, the fraud was aggravated by the application of Article 29 since, as Manuel Suárez Cortina has pointed out, "in some elections one third of the Parliament was proclaimed by this procedure. This was the case in the 1910 elections and in the following ones; while the parliamentary system remained in force, more than a hundred deputies were proclaimed by Article 29".

Even more important in Maura's "revolution from above" was the project for the reform of the local administration to grant the town councils and provincial councils, "which were living on meager resources and therefore provided deficient services", real financial and administrative autonomy. But Maura proposed a corporative system for the election of the town councils, which aroused the opposition of the liberals, radically opposed to the corporative vote, who resorted to parliamentary obstructionism during its processing, and prevented the bill from being approved. At the same time, the Maura government developed a Spanish nationalist policy which it extended to the economic field with the protection and promotion of national industry and also dealt with the social question by implementing a series of legislative initiatives relating to Sunday rest, the work of women and children, emigration, strikes, conciliation and arbitration in labor relations in industry, and so on, culminating in the creation of the Instituto Nacional de Previsión (National Welfare Institute).

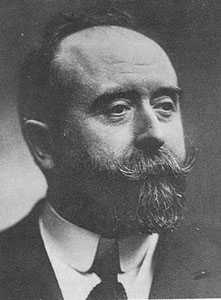
Minister of the Interior Juan de la Cierva.

The public order policy was developed by the authoritarian Minister of the Interior, Juan de la Cierva y Peñafiel. His star project was the law for the repression of terrorism, which allowed the government to close newspapers and anarchist centers and banish those responsible for them without a court order. The law was attacked by the Republicans and the Socialists, who considered it a threat to liberties. The opposition to the law was also joined by the liberals, giving birth to the "Bloque de Izquierdas" which was promoted by the trust of the three main liberal newspapers of Madrid (El Liberal, El Imparcial, El Heraldo de Madrid) and which took the form of a large rally "against Maura and his work" in the Princesa theater in Madrid on May 28, 1908, three weeks after the law was approved in first instance by the Senate.

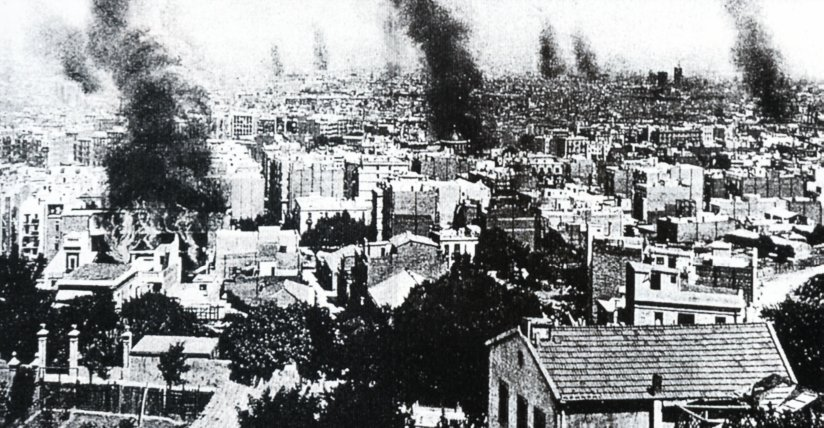
Barcelona became La ciutat cremada ("the burned city") during the Tragic Week.

But what finally brought down the Maura government was the Tragic Week in Barcelona and the repression that followed. On July 9, 1909, workers building a mining railroad around Melilla were attacked by rebel Rifian cabilas —four Spanish workers were killed— so the government decided to send reinforcements from the mainland, 44,000 men, many of them reservists, married and with children. This unleashed a wave of protests against the war in Morocco that culminated, as a result of the embarkation of troops in Barcelona, with the events of the Tragic Week. On Monday, July 26, a general strike broke out in Barcelona, which soon spread to other Catalan cities and which in the Catalan capital resulted in an anticlerical riot, the product, according to Javier Moreno Luzón, "of years of revolutionary propaganda, in the midst of a popular culture that blamed the country's ills on the influence of the Church, considered hypocritical and sinister".

In a week of riots 104 civilians and 8 guards and soldiers were killed —the wounded numbered several hundred— and 63 religious buildings were burned —including 21 churches and 30 convents—. The subsequent repression was very harsh: 1700 people were imprisoned and there were death sentences, of which 5 were executed —59 were sentenced to life imprisonment and 175 were exiled—. The best known figure among those arrested was the pedagogue and anarchist activist Francisco Ferrer Guardia whose execution on October 13 raised waves of indignation throughout Europe.

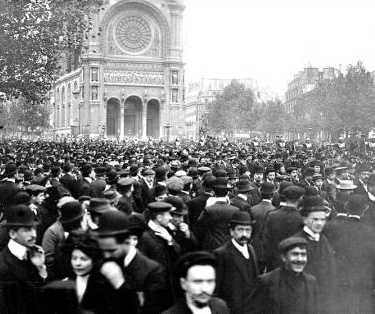
Protest in Paris at the execution of Francisco Ferrer Guardia (October 17, 1909).

The international protest, which had hardly been followed up in Spain, was used by the Liberal Party to promote a campaign together with the Republicans against the government with the slogan "Maura, no". On September 20, the PSOE joined this anti-Maurist "Block of the Left", thus abandoning for the first time in its history isolationism and the rejection of the "bourgeois parties".

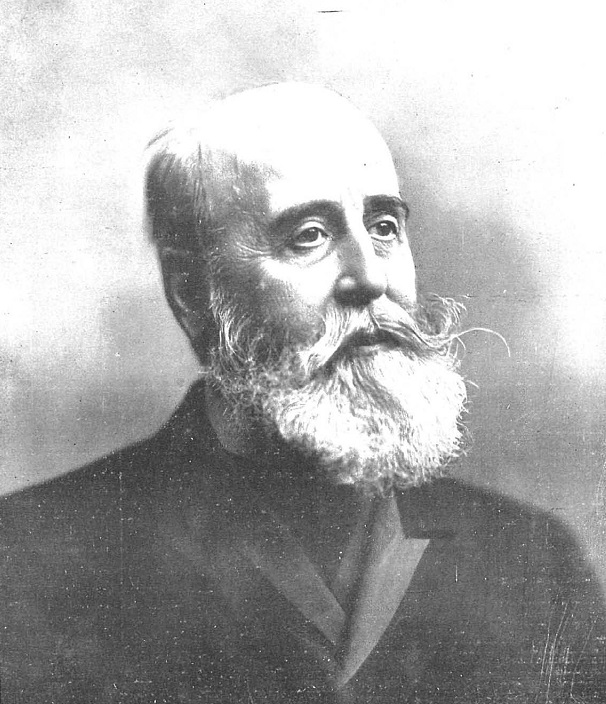
The liberal Segismundo Moret in 1909.

On October 18, 1909, only five days after Ferrer's execution, a heated debate began in the Congress of Deputies that lasted several days in which the Minister of the Interior Juan de la Cierva even accused Moret that his policies when he was at the head of the government had led to the assassination attempt against the King. The scandal in the Parliament became even greater when Maura supported Cierva by shaking his hand. The next day the liberal newspaper El Imparcial declared that the situation was "extremely serious" because the liberals had been accused of "sinister contacts with the anarchists". The Diario Universal, owned by the liberal Count of Romanones, affirmed that the government could not last "not even one more day". On October 22 Maura went to the Palace to present the continuity of his government to the King, but when he presented his resignation in a formal manner, the King accepted it. Gabriel Maura Gamazo recounted many years later the shock his father felt when he was removed as President of the Government. The King appointed Moret in his place.

The replacement of Maura by Moret was an unusual event in the history of the Restoration. The party in opposition, in this case the Liberal, had brought down the party in power, the Conservative, by resorting to a street campaign and seeking the support of the "anti-dynastic" parties —Republicans and Socialists—. That is why Maura responded to his dismissal by liquidating the pact on which the political regime of the Restoration had been based. Thus, the crisis of the Tragic Week "led to a breakdown of the basic solidarity that linked the protagonists of the turn under the constitution of 1876", states Javier Moreno Luzón.

=== Liberals in power (1909–1913): Reforms of Canalejas ===
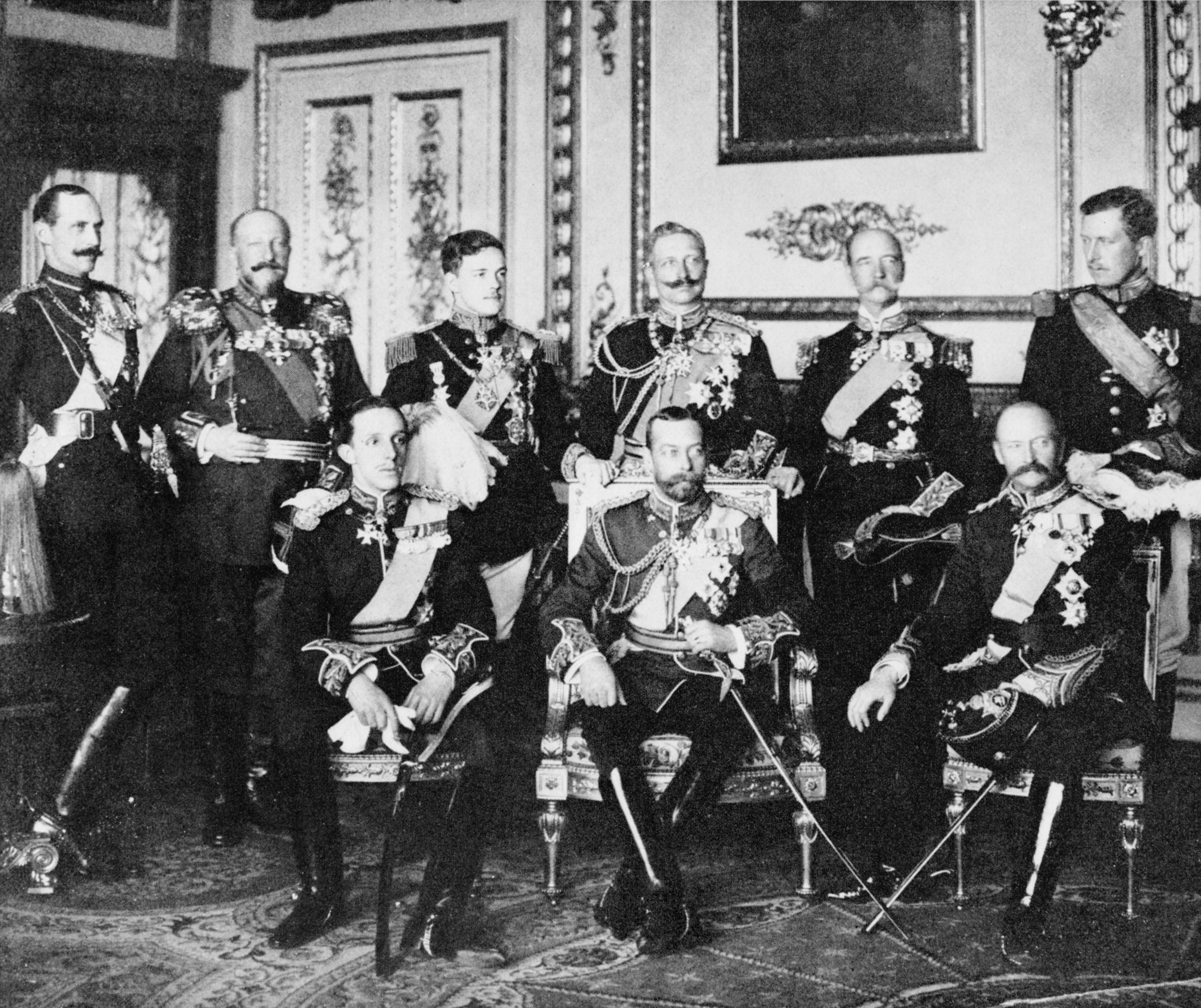
Alfonso XIII attended the funeral of King Edward VII in London (May, 1910).

The government of the liberal Segismundo Moret, who had succeeded the long government of Antonio Maura, lasted few months. His approach to the republicans opened a crisis in the liberal party that was taken advantage of by the King to intervene and appoint José Canalejas as the new president of the government in February 1910.

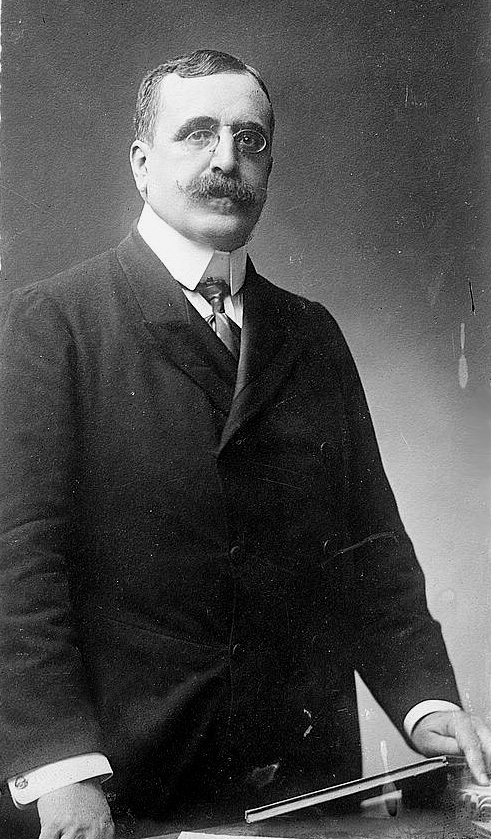
José Canalejas.

Canalejas' political project, described as "democratic regeneration", "was based on a complete nationalization of the monarchy, in line with the English or Italian experiences" and his government program was typical of the liberal interventionism that "conceived the state as the main modernizing agent of the country". Thus he tackled all the problems of the moment, among them the "religious question" was one of his priorities. The ultimate goal of Canalejas, according to Javier Tusell, was to achieve a "friendly" separation of Church and State "which [Canalejas] wanted to achieve through negotiations carried out as discreetly as possible". The problem was that the Vatican, "which in those years was obsessed with the condemnation of modernism", was not willing to modify the privileged position of the Catholic Church in Spain.

Canalejas proposed to reduce the weight of the religious orders by means of a law that would treat them as associations, except for the two recognized in the Concordat of 1851. While the Parliament was debating it, in December 1910 a transitory and temporary provision known as the Law of the Padlock (in Spanish: "Ley del candado") was approved, according to which no new religious orders could be established in Spain during the following two years. But the law was practically without effect when an amendment was approved according to which, if after two years the law of associations had not been approved, the restriction would be lifted. And that is what ended up happening, since the law never saw the light of day and the number of religious continued to grow. In spite of everything, Canalejas, a devout Catholic, was considered the enemy of the Catholic religion, at a time when the Portuguese revolution of 1910, which had put an end to the Monarchy and proclaimed the First Portuguese Republic, was causing a commotion.

The government was more successful in the reforms undertaken to address the social question. Canalejas was convinced that the way to resolve labor conflicts was through arbitration and negotiation between employers and workers, so he favored the mediating role of the Institute of Social Reforms created in 1903, under the government of the conservative Francisco Silvela. He also enacted measures aimed at improving the living and working conditions of the working class, although he did not manage to get the collective labor contract law passed, which was his star project in this field, as he encountered fierce opposition to it.

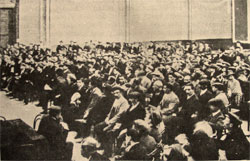
Founding congress of the CNT in 1910.

During the Canalejas government there was a great increase in strikes, motivated by the strengthening and expansion of the workers' organizations. The abandonment of isolation by the socialists with the formation in November 1909 of the republican-socialist conjunction which brought its general secretary Pablo Iglesias to the Congress of Deputies stimulated the rapid expansion of the PSOE and above all of the UGT union, while the majority anarcho-syndicalist workers' current was consolidated with the birth in 1910 of the National Confederation of Labor. The government's response was to alternate arbitration with repression, as occurred with the revolutionary general strike of 1911, which led to the dissolution of the CNT and the prosecution of the UGT leaders.

Canalejas also dealt with two of the oldest demands of the popular classes that motivated periodic protests and riots: the abolition of the indirect taxes known as "consumos" that taxed basic products, thus increasing their price; and the inequalities when it came to military service. The "consumos", which Canalejas himself considered "a plundering of the proletariat", were abolished, although the president had to use his best efforts with the deputies of his own party who opposed the bill, threatening them that "whoever does not vote [this law] is in front of me and is outside the liberal party, subject to my leadership by his will". In spite of everything, thirty deputies voted against it.

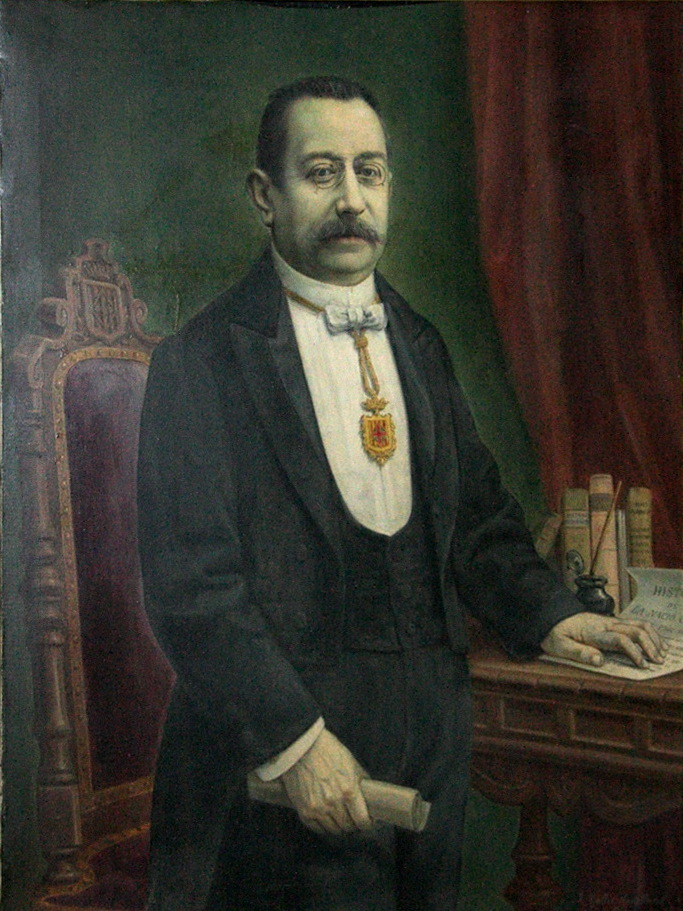
Portrait of Enric Prat de la Riba, when he was president of the Provincial Deputation of Barcelona.

As for the second popular demand, in 1912 compulsory military service was established, although only in wartime, which meant putting an end to the "redemption in cash" that allowed wealthy families that their sons did not do military service by paying a certain amount of money. But in peacetime, an intermediate solution was chosen, since it seemed that cash redemptions could not be dispensed with to finance the army. Thus were born the so-called "quota soldiers", recruits who only did military service for five months if they paid 2000 pesetas and for ten months if they paid 1500 —the latter amount was the amount earned by a day laborer in a year—. As a kind of compensation, the law also established that the only sons of poor families were exempted from military service.

Canalejas also addressed the Catalan question and proposed to satisfy the demands of the Catalanist Regionalist League by creating a new regional body that would integrate the four Catalan deputations under the name of Commonwealth of Catalonia (in Spanish: Mancomunidad de Cataluña) and that would be headed by one of the leaders of the League, Enric Prat de la Riba, then president of the Provincial Deputation of Barcelona. To obtain the support of the majority of the liberal deputies Canalejas had to make one of his best parliamentary speeches, and even so 19 of his deputies, among them Segismundo Moret, voted against it. The project was approved on June 5, 1912, by the Congress of Deputies, but when Canalejas died it had not yet been ratified by the Senate, so it did not enter into force until December 1913, and the Mancomunidad de Cataluña would not be constituted until March 1914.

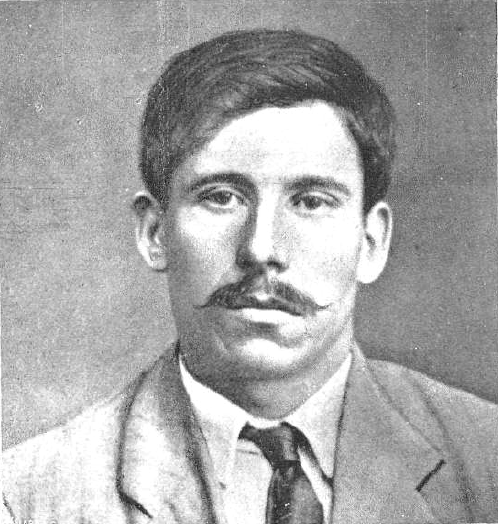
The anarchist Manuel Pardiñas who assassinated Canalejas on November 12, 1912.

Canalejas was successful in dealing with the Moroccan problem, when he managed in May 1911 to secure control of the Spanish "zone of influence" with the capture of Arcila, Larache and Alcazarquivir, in response to the capture of Fez by the French, which allowed him to negotiate with France, with the mediation of Great Britain, the definitive establishment of the Spanish protectorate of Morocco. At the beginning of November 1912 the definitive agreement with France on Morocco had been reached, but the signing of the treaty, planned for the end of the month, could not be carried out by Canalejas because he was assassinated on the 12th by an anarchist in the Puerta del Sol in Madrid.

The disappearance of Canalejas had a great importance in the Spanish political life because it left without leadership one of the parties of the turn, the liberal, that during the rest of the reign of Alfonso XIII was not able to reconstruct, being divided in factions, which contributed to the crisis of the political regime of the Restoration.

=== Return of the conservatives to power (1913–1915): "Suitable" versus "maurists". ===
The division of the liberal party was the cause of the fall of the government of the Count of Romanones since it was a faction of his own party, the liberal-democratic one headed by Manuel García Prieto, which provoked it by voting together with the conservatives in a motion of confidence presented by the government in the Senate.

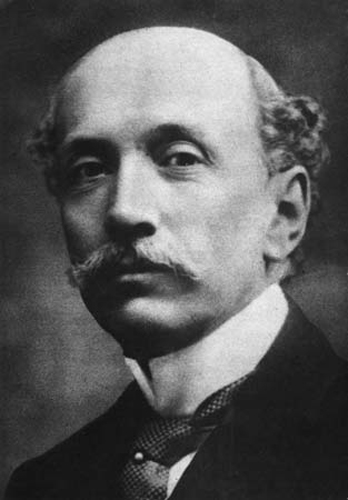
Eduardo Dato, leader of the suitable conservatives.

The King then appointed Eduardo Dato as President of the Government, but his party, the Conservative, was as fractured as the Liberal, because its leader Antonio Maura had broken with the turn system. Maura considered that after the assassination of Canalejas the King should not have appointed another liberal to head the government but should have given way to a conservative government. On January 1, 1913, Maura had made public a letter in which he announced his resignation as head of the Conservative Party and advised the formation of another "suitable" party to take turns with the liberals.

Maura's criticisms became more radical when the Courts were opened in May 1913. He attacked the liberals and described their arrival to power as an "assault". A part of his party, grouped around Eduardo Dato, questioned Maura's position, which ended up fracturing the party between "maurists" and " suitable ones" (the defenders of maintaining the turn with the liberals). In reality, Maurism was constituted as a new Catholic and nationalist political movement, differentiated from the parties of the turn. The paradox was that it was not led by Maura himself, who thus placed himself in an "extremely ambiguous" position. Dato managed to stay in power for the next two years but "at the cost of not having the Parliament open for more than seven months, a resource that governments will increasingly resort to", says Santos Juliá.

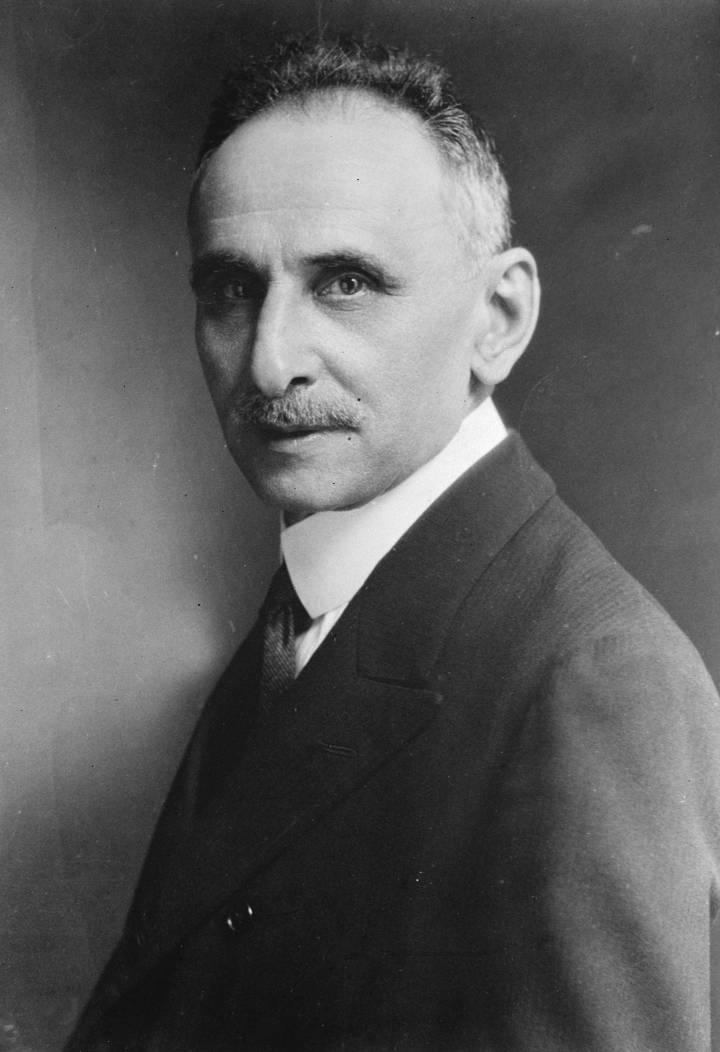
Melquiades Álvarez, leader of the Reformist Party.

According to Suárez Cortina, from 1913 to 1914 "the parliamentary system entered a new phase of crisis derived from the crisis of the parties of the turn" converted into "a set of factions that made political rotation difficult. The turn, as it had functioned uninterruptedly since 1885, was over". On the other hand, as Javier Tusell and Genoveva García Queipo de Llano have pointed out, the division of the turn parties multiplied "the possibility or even the probability of the intervention of the King", who became "a sort of arbiter" between the factions. And also thanks to this "the monarch ratified his role, already very relevant, vis-à-vis the army".

In this context of crisis of the dynastic parties, the Reformist Party of Melquiades Álvarez appeared, which was made up of republicans who had abandoned the republican-socialist conjunction because they were willing to accept the Monarchy if it was transformed into a democratic Monarchy, thus postulating itself as the left party of the system, after Maura's rejection of the turn. Alvarez appealed to the republicans who believed that being "the Republic superior, infinitely superior, theoretically, to the Monarchy, they considered the forms of government accidental, circumstantial, transitory, historical."

The younger generation of intellectuals joined the reformist project and in October 1913 launched the League of Political Education whose manifesto was signed by José Ortega y Gasset, Manuel Azaña, Gabriel Gancedo, Fernando de los Ríos, the Marquis of Palomares del Duero, Leopoldo Palacios, Manuel García Morente, Constancio Bernaldo de Quirós and Agustín Viñales. In March 1914, Ortega y Gasset gave a conference entitled Vieja y nueva política (Old and New Politics) in which he stated that the turn system was exhausted and that it had to be replaced by a new one. As Santos Juliá has pointed out, "the central thesis of the generation of intellectuals who were in their thirties in those years" was that "the work of renovation... was possible without a change of regime" based on the hypothesis that "the crown, although part of the old politics, would take advantage of the crisis of the turn and open the door to that new politics that was pushing from outside".

=== Restoration Crisis (1914–1923) ===
==== Beginning of the crisis and the impact of the Great War in Spain ====
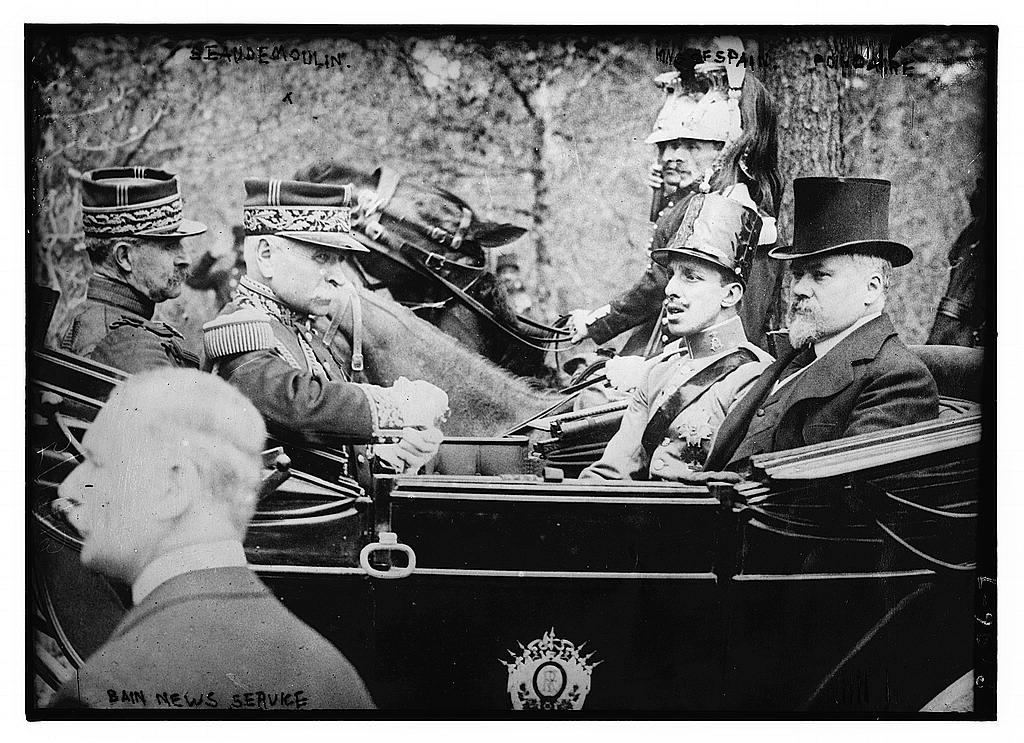
Alfonso XIII visiting Paris in 1913, a year before the outbreak of the First World War. Seated next to him the president of the Third French Republic Raymond Poincaré.

According to historian Manuel Suárez Cortina, "the social and political effects of the war represented a decisive factor in the definitive crisis of the parliamentary system as it had been functioning since 1875. Food shortages, economic dislocation, social misery, precariousness and inflation stimulated the political awakening and ideological militancy of the masses. Under these conditions, the clientelist and cacique modality of Spanish politics broke down. After the war it was no longer possible to restore the old order". Historian Ángeles Barrio, for her part, affirms that the war "was not, however, the immediate cause of the collapse of the two-party system" because "the party system was already in decay when the war broke out".

When World War I began in August 1914, the conservative government of Eduardo Dato decided to keep Spain neutral, because in his opinion, shared by the majority of the ruling class, it lacked the motives and resources to enter the conflict. King Alfonso XIII also agreed and very few opposed neutrality.

Neutrality had important economic and social consequences since it greatly boosted the process of "modernization" that had begun timidly in 1900, due to the considerable increase in Spanish industrial production, to which new markets —those of the belligerent countries, and those of the countries they could no longer supply— suddenly opened up. However, inflation skyrocketed while wages grew at a slower rate and shortages of basic necessities, such as bread, occurred, which provoked food riots in the cities and an increase in labor conflicts led by the two large unions, CNT and UGT, which demanded wage increases to halt the decline in real wages.

==== Return of the liberals to power and the increase of social conflict (1915–1917) ====
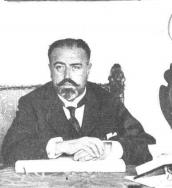
Santiago Alba, Minister of Finance in the government of the Count of Romanones, who failed in his attempt to establish an extraordinary tax on war profits.

Continuing with the turn system, in December 1915, the liberal Count of Romanones replaced the conservative Eduardo Dato at the head of the government. He immediately obtained an ample majority in the Courts in the elections of the following year, thanks to the agreement he reached with the conservative leader in the distribution of seats in the establishment. The new government had to face the growing social unrest led by the CNT and the UGT. In May 1916 the UGT agreed in its XII Congress to make a pact with the CNT to develop joint actions. A similar resolution was agreed by the CNT at its congress held in Valencia in May. The result was the call for a general strike throughout Spain for December 18 in protest against rising prices and shortages. The strike was a success and so the two organizations decided in March of the following year to prepare another, this time "indefinite" and, therefore, "revolutionary", whose aim would be "a complete transformation of the economic structure of the country and of the political structure as well".

In April 1917, one month after the fall of Tsarism, the government of the liberal Romanones, a recognized Allyophile, fell due to his belligerent stance regarding the sinking of Spanish merchant ships by German submarines. Romanones was replaced by the also liberal Manuel García Prieto, considered closer to the Central Empires than his predecessor. But his government only lasted three months because of the serious crisis he had to face, provoked by the challenge launched by the recently created Defence Juntas.

==== Crisis of 1917 ====
The initial trigger of the 1917 crisis, "the worst crisis that the constitutional regime of the Restoration had experienced since its origins" according to Moreno Luzón, was the problem posed by the movement of the "Juntas de Defensa", born in 1916. These were corporate organizations of soldiers stationed on the peninsula who demanded an increase in their salaries —inflation was also affecting the officers— and who also protested against the rapid promotions for war merits obtained by their comrades stationed in Morocco, and who thanks to them could increase their income.

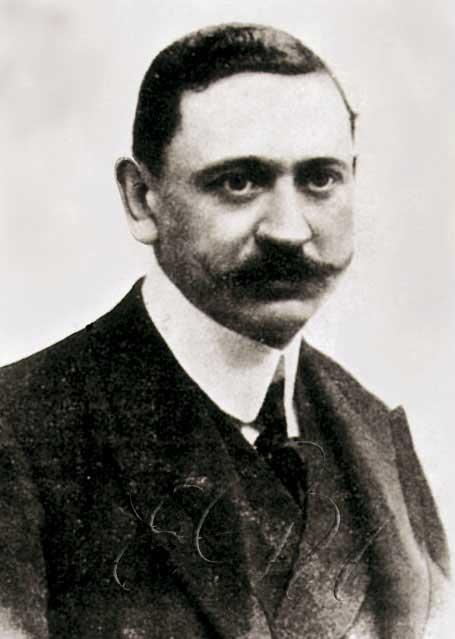
Manuel García Prieto, president of the government who opposed the legalization of the Defence Juntas but was forced to resign due to the lack of support from king Alfonso XIII.

The juntas demanded their legal recognition, which was opposed by the government of Romanones. The government that succeeded him presided by the liberal Manuel García Prieto went further and ordered the dissolution of the juntas, but the King sided with the juntas "although to do so he had to disavow his Minister of Defense and change the liberal government for a conservative one, in a last attempt to normalize the situation". The government of García Prieto fell and "a conservative one was formed, under the presidency of Dato, who hastened to give in by approving the junta regulations". Thus, what happened in 1905–1906 with the events of the ¡Cu-Cut! and the subsequent approval of the Law of Jurisdictions was repeated again in 1917: the military appealed to the King and he again took their side; he forced the government to resign, replacing it with another one presided by the conservative Eduardo Dato, who suspended the constitutional guarantees, censored the press and accepted the regulations of the "Juntas de Defensa" (Defence Juntas). He also closed the Courts a few days later.

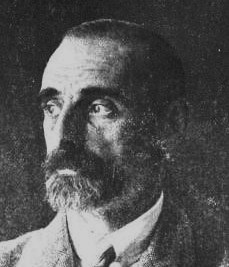
Francesc Cambó, leader of the Lliga Regionalista.

In this context of political crisis, the Catalanist leader Francesc Cambó took the initiative and on July 5 gathered all the Catalan deputies and senators at the City Council of Barcelona —although the 13 monarchist deputies left the meeting immediately—- who reaffirmed the will of Catalonia to become an autonomous region, a right that could be extended to other regions, and demanded the reopening of the Courts, which would have the function of constituent assembly. If the Dato government did not accept any of the requests, they would call on all the deputies and senators to attend an Assembly of Parliamentarians to be held on July 19 in Barcelona. The Dato government tried to discredit the call by presenting the meeting as a "separatist" and "revolutionary" movement, a campaign that was supported by the conservative press. Finally, Maura did not go to Barcelona, as Cambó expected, and only the deputies of the Catalanist League, the Republicans, the reformists of Melquíades Álvarez and the socialist Pablo Iglesias attended, who approved the formation of a government "which embodied and represented the sovereign will of the country" and which would preside over the elections to the Constituent assembly. The Assembly was dissolved by order of the civil governor of Barcelona and all the participants were arrested by the police, although as soon as they left the Palace of the Parque de la Ciudadela where they had met they were released.

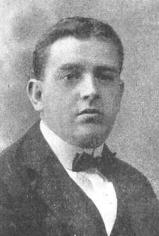
Andrés Saborit Colomer, member of the Strike Committee. He was arrested and sentenced to life imprisonment. He was pardoned after being elected deputy for the PSOE in the general elections of the following year.

Meanwhile, the workers' organizations continued with the preparations for the general strike which they had announced in March. But the Socialists decided to call it on their own, in support of the Valencia railroad workers on strike, with the aim of overthrowing the Monarchy, forming a provisional government and calling a Constituent Parliament. For this reason the CNT, faithful to its "apoliticism", remained on the sidelines.

The strike was a resounding failure. It only had a certain following in Madrid, Barcelona, Valencia and the industrial centers of the north (Vizcaya, Guipúzcoa, Santander, Asturias), and had no impact on the countryside, which, according to Suárez Cortina, "would have been decisive for the authorities to be able to effectively quell the revolt". In addition, the Catholic trade unions condemned the movement and young monarchists volunteered to keep public services running. For Santos Julia, the key to the failure was that the Defence Juntas, which the socialists thought they had "essential coincidences" with, sided with the established order, and not only did they not lead any revolution, but they were fully employed in the repression —"neither did the soldiers form sóviets with the workers, in the Russian manner, but in general they obeyed their bosses", Moreno Luzón points out—.

The final balance of the repression of the strike was 71 dead, 200 wounded and more than 2,000 arrested, among them the members of the strike committee (Julián Besteiro and Andrés Saborit, for the PSOE; and Francisco Largo Caballero and Daniel Anguiano for the UGT). As Javier Moreno Luzón has pointed out, "the crisis of 1917 deflated any further adventures. The Catalan nationalists, the reformists and even the radicals backed down and, to varying extents, offered their services to the Crown. The republican-socialist conjunction volatilized, as did the workers' agreement. Socialism entered a stage of internal dissensions and anarcho-unionism sharpened its hatred of politics. Thus, the constitutional regime of the Restoration, given up for dead on so many occasions, showed a surprising solidity, which gave it oxygen for six more years.

==== "Escape" from the crisis of 1917: "Concentration governments" and the return to the turnismo (1917–1918) ====
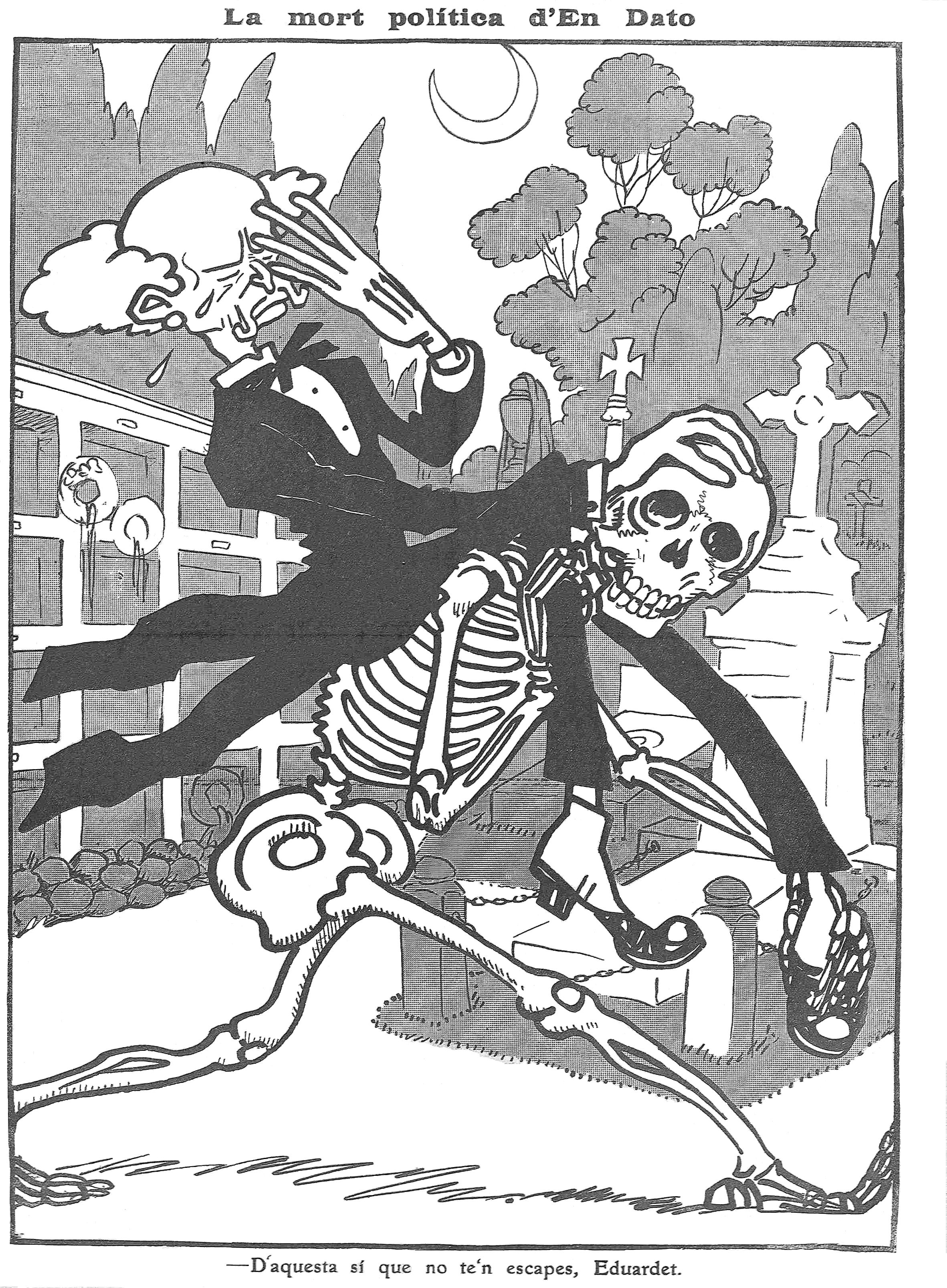
Caricature of Eduardo Dato published in La Campana de Gràcia of Barcelona after the crisis of the summer of 1917, entitled "The political death of Mr. Dato". The caption reads: "You can't escape from this one, Eduardito".

On October 30, the Assembly of Parliamentarians met at the Ateneo in Madrid, presided over by Cambó, who pressed for the end of the turn. That same day he was called to the Palace to meet with the King, who proposed the formation of a government of broad representation that would guarantee the holding of fair elections. After the interview Cambó returned to the Ateneo in Madrid and informed the parliamentarians of the agreement of Alfonso XIII with the proposals of the Assembly and that he was also willing to appoint ministers to the two people they designated.

On November 1, 1917, for the first time in the history of the Restoration, a "concentration government" of conservatives, liberals and the Lliga was formed, presided over by the liberal Manuel García Prieto, although the factions of the conservative Dato and the liberal Santiago Alba were left out. The government called the elections of February 1918, which were pretended to be "clean", but the cacique networks continued to function, resulting in the confirmation of the division of the dynastic parties. The Congress of Deputies was formed by 95 conservative deputies, 70 liberal "garcíaprietistas" and 54 from the rest of the liberal factions, 20 from the Lliga, 7 from the PNV —who obtained representation for the first time— and 6 socialists —who in the previous Cortes had only 1 deputy—. Given their fragmentation, these Cortes were ungovernable because no group had a clear majority. Assessing the result of the elections, Cambó commented that it was "a disaster", "our disgrace" and the demonstration that with the parties of the time it was impossible "to create a strong and prestigious parliamentary power that would be the basis and foundation of all the other constitutional powers".

The "government of concentration" lasted only a few months. A strike of civil servants, who, stimulated by the example of the military, formed their own juntas, was what put an end to it. Then the King commissioned the Count of Romanones to bring together all the liberal and conservative faction leaders to look for a solution. On the night of March 20, 1918, they met at the Palacio de Oriente and there Alfonso XIII threatened them with abdication if they did not accept the formation of a "concentration government" with all of them presided over by Antonio Maura.

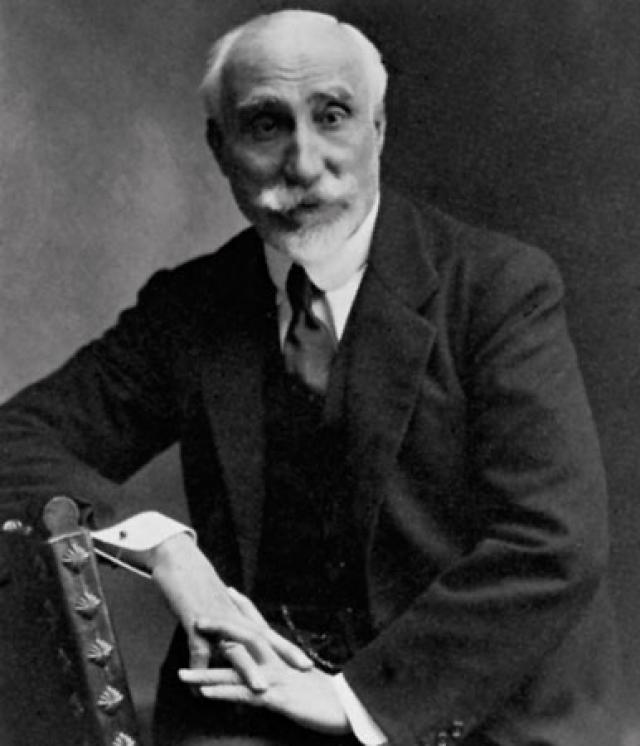
Antonio Maura president of the "National Government" formed in March 1918.

Thus was born the so-called "National Government" which included all the heads of the dynastic factions —Romanones, Alba, García Prieto, among the liberals; Dato, Cierva, together with Maura himself, among the conservatives—, as well as the leader of Catalan nationalism, Francesc Cambó. The new government granted amnesty to the imprisoned Socialist leaders, who were thus able to occupy their seats in the Parliament, and approved a Law of Bases on the irremovability of civil servants and criteria for their promotion based on seniority, which put an end to the figure of the "cesante". However, the government ran aground when it tried to approve the State budgets, which had been prorogued since 1914, so Maura presented his resignation to the King in November 1918.

After the failure of the two "concentration governments", the "turn" between conservatives and liberals was resumed —actually the turn between factions— but in the following two and a half years political stability was not achieved either, since up to seven governments succeeded each other.

==== "Regional question". ====
Maura's "National Government" was succeeded on November 10, 1918, by a liberal government presided over by García Prieto, with Santiago Alba in the Treasury. It had to face the serious "food supply problem" caused by the rise in prices, but the reforms that Alba tried to introduce again met with the resistance of the industrial sectors that had benefited so much from the Spanish neutrality in the Great War, while the demonstrations of protest against the increase in the price of basic products increased. Finally, it was the pressure of the Lliga, which demanded a statute of autonomy for Catalonia, that brought down the cabinet only a month after it had been formed. The king then entrusted the government to the Count of Romanones, whose primary task, according to Ángeles Barrio, was "to steer the autonomy issue through smoother channels".

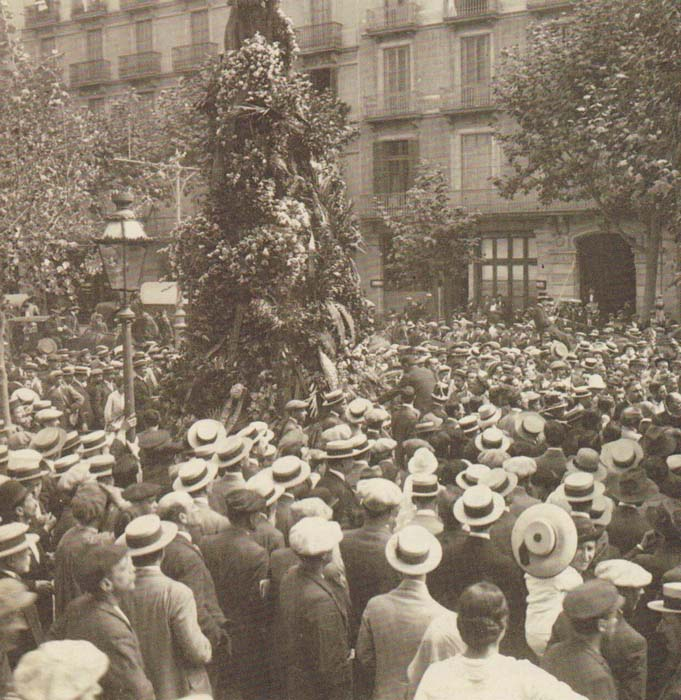
Homage to Rafael Casanova in the 1914 Diada.

Cambó and the Lliga had organized a campaign for "full autonomy" for Catalonia which, according to Moreno Luzón, "shook the Spanish political scene to its foundations" and initially had the support of the King, who intended, as he told Cambó, to distract "the masses [of Catalonia] from any revolutionary purpose". For Cambó, "Catalonia's time had come".

The possibility of the granting of a Statute of Autonomy for Catalonia provoked the immediate reaction of Spanish nationalism, which deployed a strong anti-Catalanist campaign plagued with clichés and stereotypes about Catalonia and the Catalans, but which managed to mobilize thousands of people who protested in Madrid and other cities.

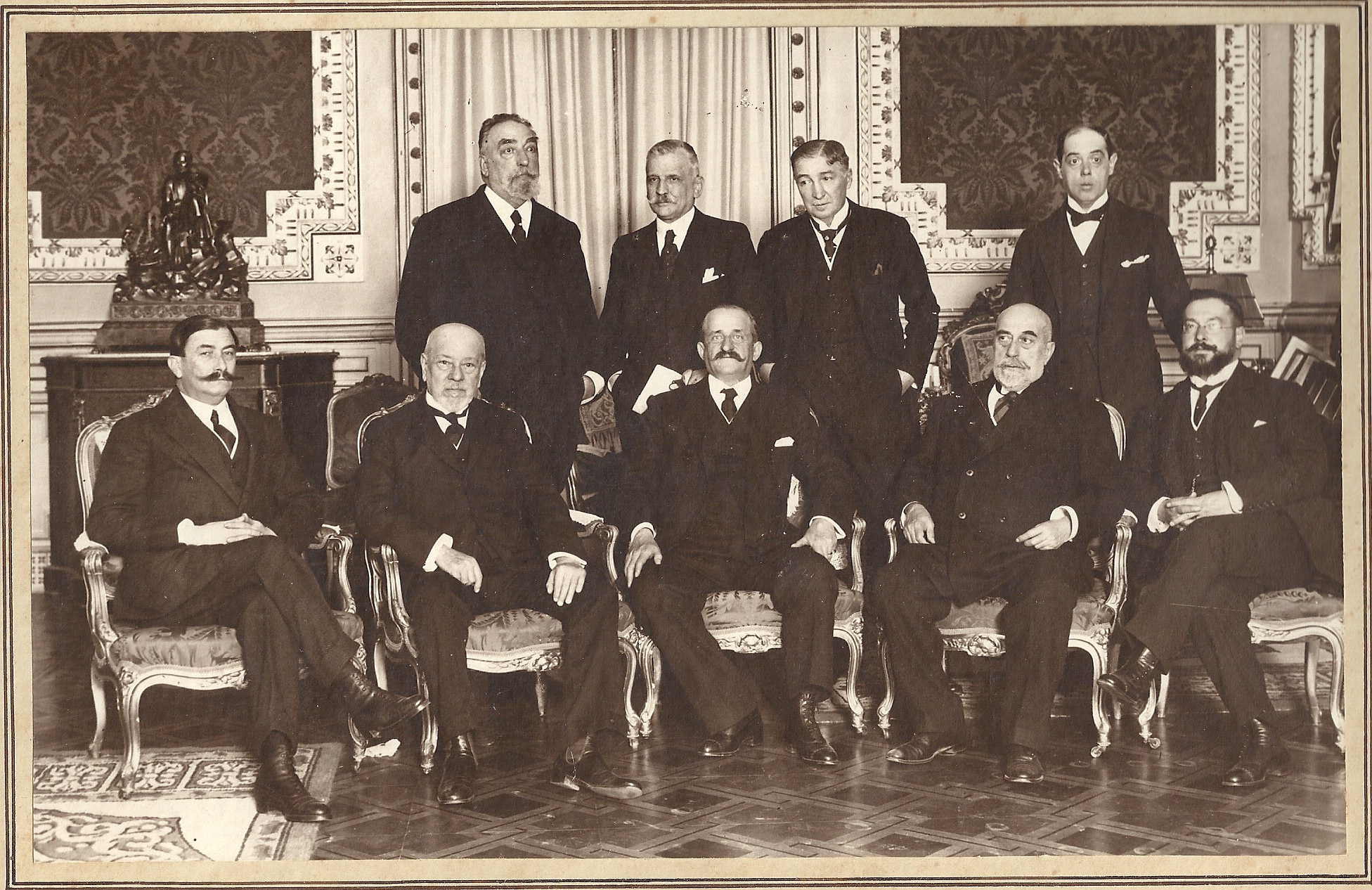
Government presided by the Count of Romanones, seated in the center.

On December 2, 1918, one day after the Romanones government was formed, the Castilian deputations, meeting in Burgos, responded to Catalan pretensions with the Message from Castile in which they defended Spanish "national unity" and opposed any region obtaining political autonomy that would undermine Spanish sovereignty —and even called for a boycott of "the orders of the Catalan industrial houses—. They also opposed the co-officiality of Catalan, calling it a "regional dialect". The following day, the newspaper El Norte de Castilla headlined: "Faced with the problem presented by Catalan nationalism, Castilla affirms the Spanish nation". It also denounced "the separatist campaign flaunted in the Basque provinces". Only in the Basque Country and Galicia there were signs of support for the Catalan nationalists.

The King changed his position and expressed his solidarity "with the patriotic gestures of the Castilian provinces", encouraging the presidents of the deputations to continue in their efforts. In the parliamentary debate at the beginning of December, on the draft bases of the statute of autonomy presented by the Commonwealth of Catalonia, which had the support of 98% of the population of Catalonia represented by its town councils, the spokesman of the liberals, and therefore of the government, Niceto Alcalá Zamora accused Cambó of wanting to be both the Simón Bolívar of Catalonia and the Otto von Bismarck of Spain. Conservative leader Antonio Maura also opposed Catalan autonomy. Addressing the Catalan deputies, he told them that, whether they liked it or not, they were Spaniards: "No one can choose their mother, their brothers, their father's house, their hometown or their fatherland". His intervention was very applauded by the deputies of the two dynastic parties, including the President of the government, Count de Romanones. On the same day of Maura's intervention, December 12, 1918, Cambó wrote a letter to the King bidding him farewell and justifying the withdrawal from the Courts of the great majority of Catalan deputies and senators as a sign of protest for the rejection of the Statute, a gesture that was very much frowned upon by the dynastic parties. Back in Barcelona, Cambó launched in a rally the slogan "Monarchy? Republic? Catalunya!". "Neither do we mortgage autonomy to the Republic, nor do we wait for the Republic to implement autonomy, but we will not slow down our march just because the Monarchy may fall," he declared.

Romanones summoned an extra-parliamentary commission to draft a proposal that would be taken to the Parliament. The commission, chaired by Antonio Maura, drew up a very limited draft Statute that even eliminated some of the powers already exercised by the Mancomunitat de Cataluña, which was unacceptable to the Catalan deputies who had returned to Congress at the end of January 1919. Cambó then asked for a plebiscite to be allowed to be held in Catalonia to find out whether or not the citizens of Catalonia wanted a Statute of Autonomy, but the deputies of the dynastic parties, including Alfons Sala, president of the recently created National Monarchist Union, dragged out the debates and the proposal was never discussed. Finally the government closed the Parliament on February 27, taking advantage of the crisis provoked by the strike of La Canadenca in Barcelona.

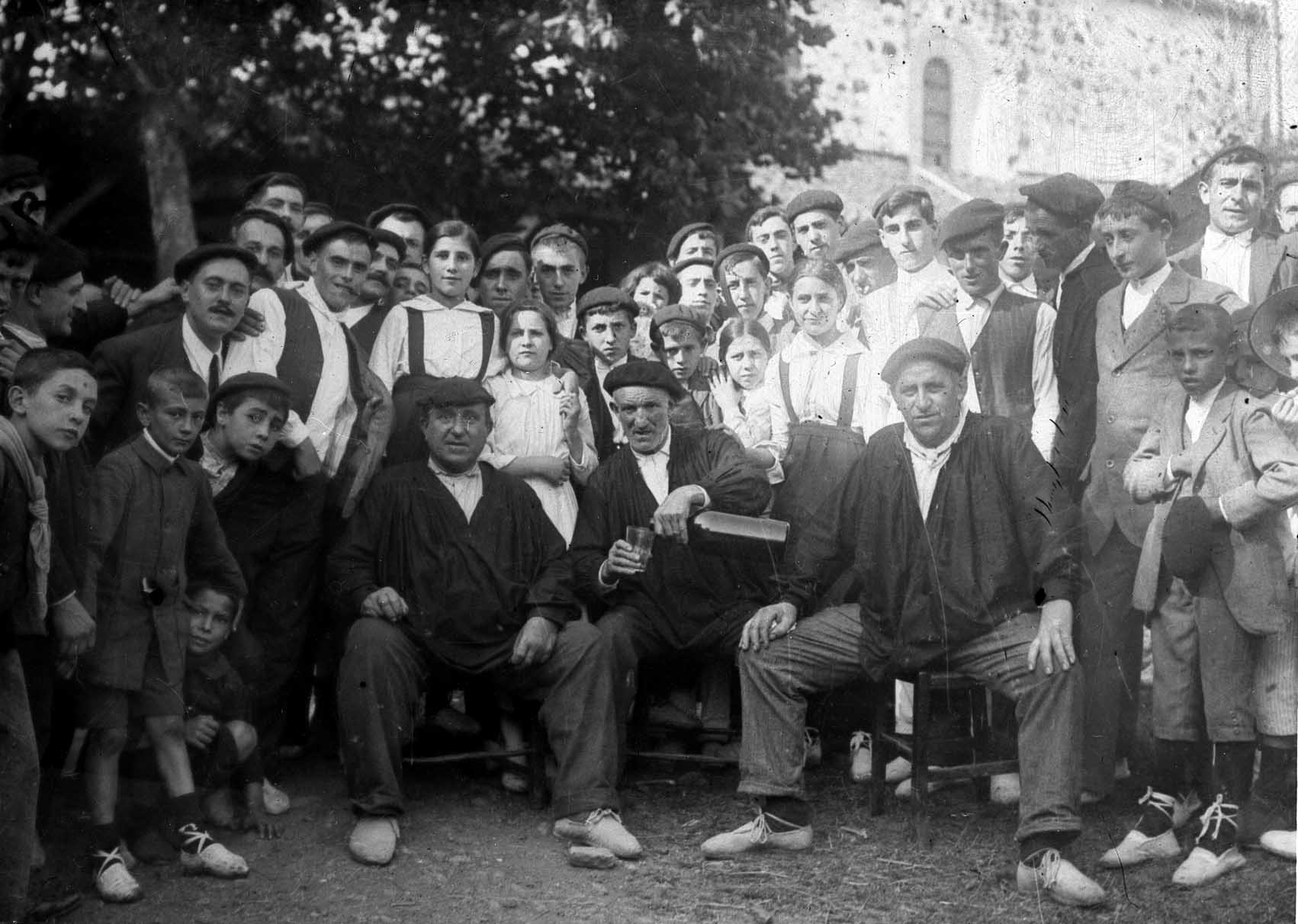
Meeting of versolaris, among them the famous Txirrita, in Arrate, Guipúzcoa (1915).

The Catalan autonomist campaign of 1918-1919 found broad support from Basque nationalism because Catalan aspirations connected with theirs. At that time, Basque nationalism was living the moment of greatest apogee of the Restoration. In 1918 it had triumphed in the elections that gave it political hegemony in Biscay, the fundamental fief of the PNV, which since 1916 had been renamed the Basque Nationalist Communion, replacing the monarchist parties of the time that had held it until then. Precisely the reason for their success had been the "autonomist path" they had taken, and their alliance with Cambó's Lliga Regionalista, which led them to also demand "integral autonomy" for the Basque Country. Thus, the three Basque deputations, on the initiative of that of Biscay, demanded "foral reintegration", or failing that, a broad autonomy based on the old fueros, a proposal that was presented in the Courts on November 8 by the Basque nationalist deputies, but which was rejected.

From 1920 onwards, the Basque Nationalist Communion suffered an electoral setback, mainly due to the fact that the monarchist parties of the time, liberals and conservatives, formed a coalition in an anti-nationalist front called the Monarchist Action League, founded in January 1919, which won the elections of 1920 and 1923, reducing the parliamentary representation of the Nationalist Communion to a single deputy for Pamplona —and that due to its alliance with the Carlists—. In addition, the Basque Nationalists lost the majority in the Vizcaya Provincial Council in 1919 and the mayoralty of Bilbao in 1920.

==== Impact of the "October Revolution": "Bolshevik triennium" and the "social war" in Catalonia ====
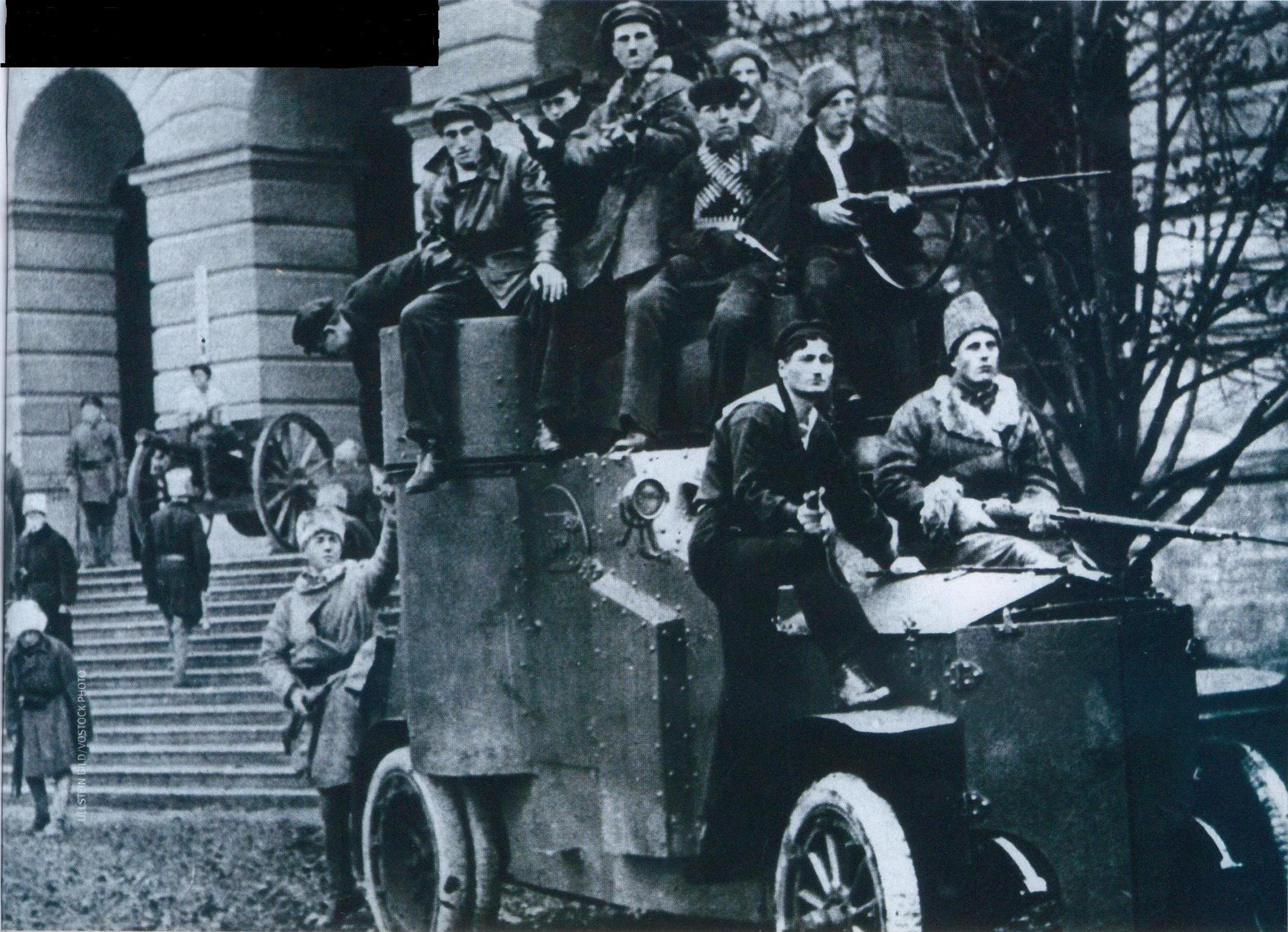
Red Guards in front of the Smolny Institute in Petrograd, center of the October Revolution of 1917 in Russia, which had an enormous impact on the workers' movement throughout the world.

To the "regional question" was added the outbreak of a serious social crisis in Catalonia and in the Andalusian countryside. "A real 'social war', with anarchist attacks and gunmen in the pay of the bosses, was declared in Catalonia and three years of mobilizations of day laborers in the countryside to whom the echoes of the Russian revolution had reached Andalusia".

In Spain, the triumph of the October Revolution in Russia had a great impact on the workers' movement. However, neither the CNT nor the PSOE joined the Third International founded by the Bolsheviks. Only a small group of socialists left the party in 1921 to found the Communist Party of Spain, a tiny group adhering to the Third International and under direct orders from Moscow. But in spite of everything the October Revolution "acted in Spain as an unstoppable mobilizing myth that shocked for years the working class, dragged its leaders and dazzled the masses they tried to frame". In Andalusia between 1918 and 1920 the mobilizations of the day laborers intensified, in what is known as the "Bolshevik triennium". There were constant strikes that were met with extraordinary harshness by the employers and the authorities. The workers' societies demanded a rise in wages and the employment of the unemployed in a locality before resorting to foreign labor. Mobilization was encouraged by means of rallies, newspapers and pamphlets, such as the one entitled The Russian Revolution: the land for those who work it, and during the strikes the day laborers occupied the farms, being violently evicted from them by the civil guard and the army. There were also sabotages and attacks. The Andalusian peasant agitation was reduced in 1920 due to repression and practically disappeared in 1922.

Meanwhile, in Catalonia there was a "social war". The conflict began in February 1919 with La Canadenca strike, which left Barcelona without electricity, water and streetcars. The Romanones government opted for negotiation but had to give in to pressure from the employers, who demanded an iron fist and found valuable allies in the Captain General of Catalonia Joaquín Milans del Bosch and king Alfonso XIII. "The services were militarized, and Barcelona recovered normality while the prisons were filled with prisoners on strike," stated Ángeles Barrio.

During that time an agreement was reached between the company and the workers thanks to the work of the moderate CNT leader Salvador Seguí. There remained the pending issue of the imprisoned strikers, subject to military jurisdiction, but Captain General Milans del Bosch did not give in, so the CNT had to carry out its threat to declare a general strike. The response of the employers, who supported Milans' position, was to declare a lock-out which condemned the workers to destitution. The government tried to dismiss Milans, who had declared a state of war, but the King opposed it, so Romanones resigned. He was replaced by the conservative Antonio Maura, who approved Milans del Bosch's policy. The CNT was dissolved and its leaders were imprisoned, while the Somatén joined in the maintenance of public order in Barcelona.

The Catalan workers' conflict degenerated into a "social war" with both sides resorting to violence, the setting being Barcelona, where unionists and employers' pistoleros clashed with each other. The latter were led by the ex-policeman Manuel Bravo Portillo, hired by the Employers' Federation, who formed an extensive and well-organized gang composed of criminals and corrupt trade unionists, who carried out the first assassinations of CNT militants and leaders. In the anarchist ranks, and protected by their leaders, action groups were formed whose members, according to Moreno Luzon, "moved between murder for hire and the anarchist revolution, protagonists of more and more attacks against businessmen, foremen, policemen, thugs and dissident workers". Among them stood out Buenaventura Durruti, "young gunman and clandestine agitator".

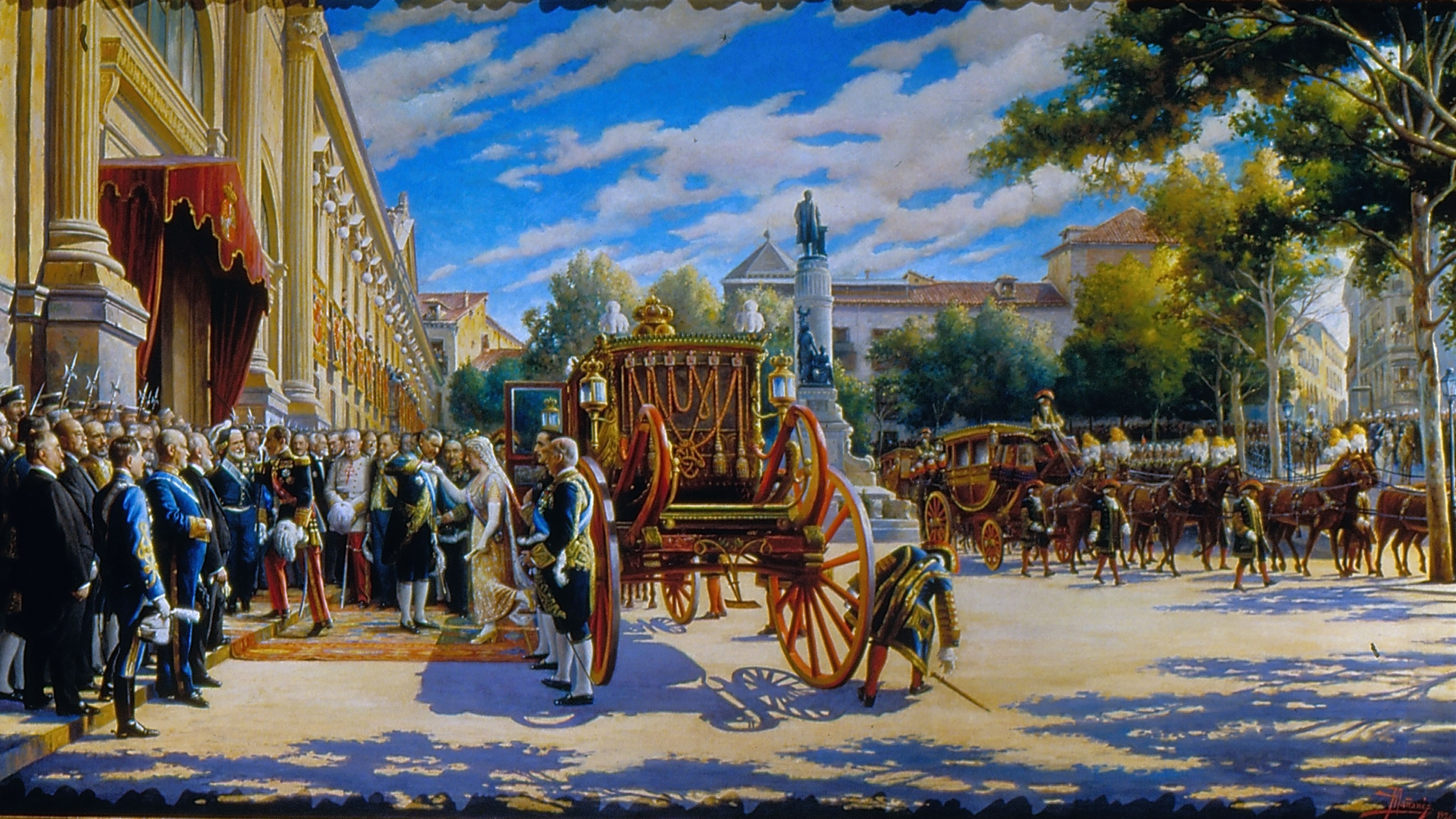
Painting by Asterio Mañanós Martínez on the opening of the Parliament in 1919 that shows the entrance of the kings in the Palace of the Senate, where they are received by the president of the government Antonio Maura.

Maura called elections in June 1919 but he did not obtain his own majority and the rest of the conservative factions refused to recognize him as head of the conservative party, in spite of the King's pressure to do so, "in defense of the monarchy and order". This led to the fall of Maura, who was succeeded in August 1919 by another conservative, Joaquín Sánchez de Toca, returning to the path of negotiation in the social war in Catalonia. However, a few months later the government fell and was replaced by the also conservative Manuel Allendesalazar Muñoz, who recovered the "iron fist". But Allendesalazar's government did not last long either and fell in May 1920, being replaced by the also conservative Eduardo Dato. The latter obtained a decree from the King to dissolve the Parliament and called new elections for December 1920, only a year and a half after those held under Maura's government.

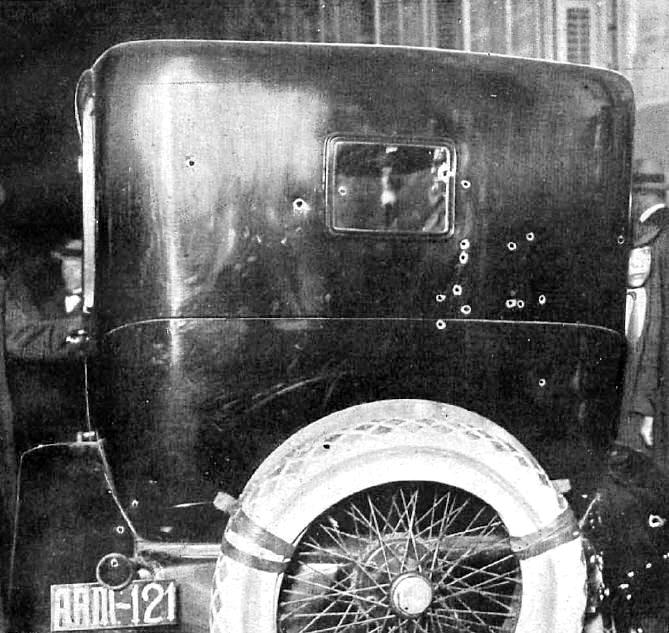
Rear part of the car in which Eduardo Dato was assassinated, showing the bullet holes.

Although at the beginning he promoted negotiation to achieve social peace, Dato returned to repressive politics after the assassination of the Count of Salvatierra, former civil governor of Barcelona during the government of Sánchez de Toca, by an anarchist group. He put at the head of the civil government of Barcelona General Severiano Martínez Anido, who applied a fierce anti-union repression that included the application of the so-called ley de fugas to prisoners, which decimated the CNT but at the same time, according to Ángeles Barrio, "stimulated activism and recourse to individual violence" and "terrorist acts and street violence between anarchists and members of the Free Trade Unions spiraled between 1920 and 1922..." The so-called free unions – as opposed to the single unions of the CNT— were made up of Catholic workers, apolitical or simply disenchanted with the anarchist strategy, whom the employers preferred to hire, which resulted in an increase in their membership – in 1922 they claimed to have 150,000 members—. This opened up a union competition that on numerous occasions ended in shootouts.

The spiral of violence reached the prime minister himself. On March 8, 1921, Eduardo Dato was assassinated in Madrid by a group of three anarchists who shot him from a sidecar as he was driving home. Dato's assassination increased the repression of the CNT and the actions of the gunmen of the "Sindicatos Libres" against its members. In 1923 Salvador Seguí, leader of the CNT, who had not supported the violent way and who defended the return to the trade union way, was also assassinated, as well as the archbishop of Zaragoza Juan Soldevila.

The number of attacks grew until 1921, declining in 1922 and rising again in 1923. According to the data of Eduardo González Calleja, quoted by Javier Moreno Luzón, there were 87 attacks in 1919, 292 in 1920, 311 in 1921, 61 in 1922 and 117 in 1923. The fatalities were 201 trade unionists and anarchists, including their lawyers (23%); 123 employers, managers and foremen (14%); 83 law enforcement officers (9.5%); 116 members of the free or anti-syndicalist unions (13%).

==== "Annual disaster" (1921–1922) ====
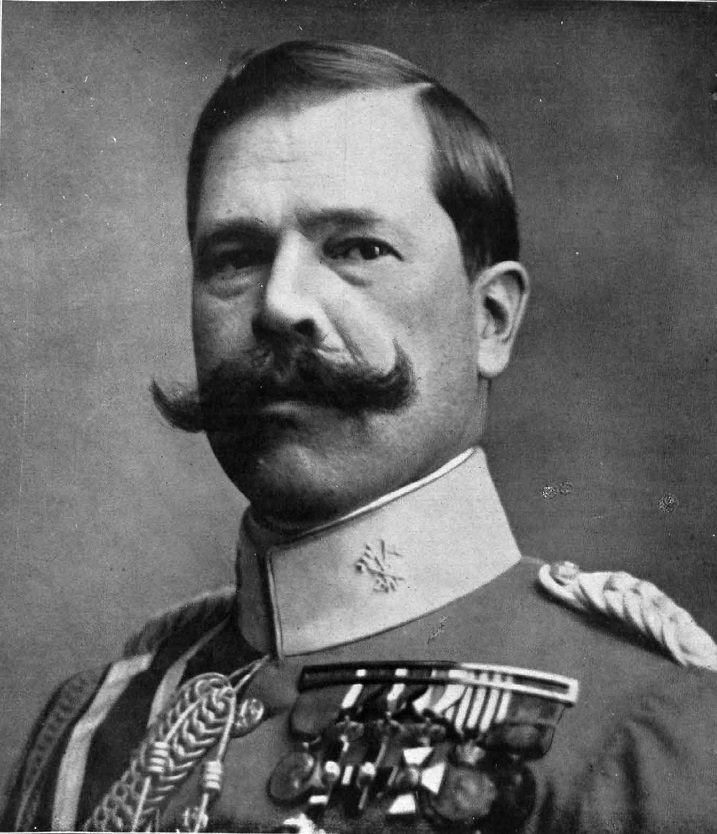
Manuel Fernández Silvestre, general of the Spanish troops in the disaster of Annual.

After the parenthesis of the Great War, the Spanish governments proposed to make effective the dominion of Spain over the entire protectorate of Morocco. This was the task entrusted to General Dámaso Berenguer, appointed Spanish High Commissioner in Morocco in 1919. The advance in the eastern zone was entrusted to General Manuel Fernández Silvestre, appointed at the beginning of 1920 as commander general of Melilla, a position that enjoyed a certain autonomy with respect to the High Commissioner since he dealt directly with the Minister of War. Fernandez Silvestre began the advance from Melilla towards the west by means of the traditional system of blockhouses —fortified wooden boxes— without encountering resistance. In December 1920 he reached the Ben Said cabila and the following month Annual, in the neighboring cabila of Beni Ulixek. Berenguer and Fernandez Silvestre met in March 1921 at the Al Hoceima Islands and decided to stop the advance. The troops of the Melilla Command were thus dispersed in an extensive territory, with supply problems and exposed to a possible attack. The most advanced post was Annual.

After a leave of absence in Madrid where he received numerous expressions of support from the people, the government and the King, Fernandez Silvestre resumed the advance in May 1921, but this time he encountered the resistance of the Rifian tribes led by Abd el-Krim, from the Beni Urriaguel cabila, located further west. Silvestre asked for reinforcements that were not granted but he did not give up the advance and on July 19 he ordered to reconquer the area of Annual. Silvestre himself arrived from Melilla on the 21st at the head of an army of 4,500 men but had to withdraw from Annual to Ben Tieb, to the southeast, in the face of the offensive unleashed by the rebels of Abd el-Krim. The High Commissioner promised to send reinforcements but they did not arrive in time.

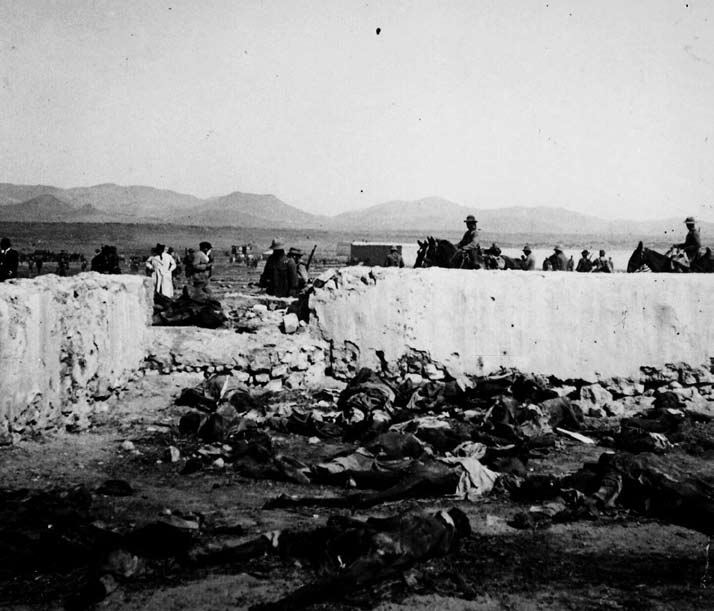
Corpses found in Annual.

"The unexpected offensive of the natives ended in a general disbandment of the Spanish Army in the direction of Melilla. The Spanish troops were dispersed in a very extensive front with a very high number of positions and with serious supply problems. The units were poorly equipped.... The collapse of the front resulted in the loss in just a few days of what had been achieved with great difficulty for years. Not only General Silvestre died but also 10,000 other soldiers".

What would be known as the "disaster of Annual" greatly shocked public opinion. In the Courts and in the press, responsibilities were demanded and King Alfonso XIII himself was accused of having encouraged Fernández Silvestre —"appointed thanks to royal favor" according to the military attaché of the French embassy— to act so imprudently, although there is no proof of this "even though he maintained close relations with him, on the other hand not very different from that which united him with other military men". The Socialist deputy Indalecio Prieto was the one who made the harshest accusation in Congress:

Those fields of domination are today fields of death: eight thousand corpses seem to gather around the steps of the throne in demand of justice.

To deal with the serious political consequences of the "disaster of Annual" the King turned to Antonio Maura who on August 3, 1921, formed, as in 1918, a "government of concentration", made up of both conservatives and liberals, and also once again the Catalan nationalist Cambó. One of the first measures taken by the new government was to open a file —whose instructor would be General Juan Picasso— to settle the military responsibilities of the disaster. Likewise, a military operation was launched to recover the territory lost in Morocco. However, Maura's government, beset by the "question of responsibilities" lasted only eight months and in March 1922 it was replaced by a conservative government presided over by José Sánchez Guerra.

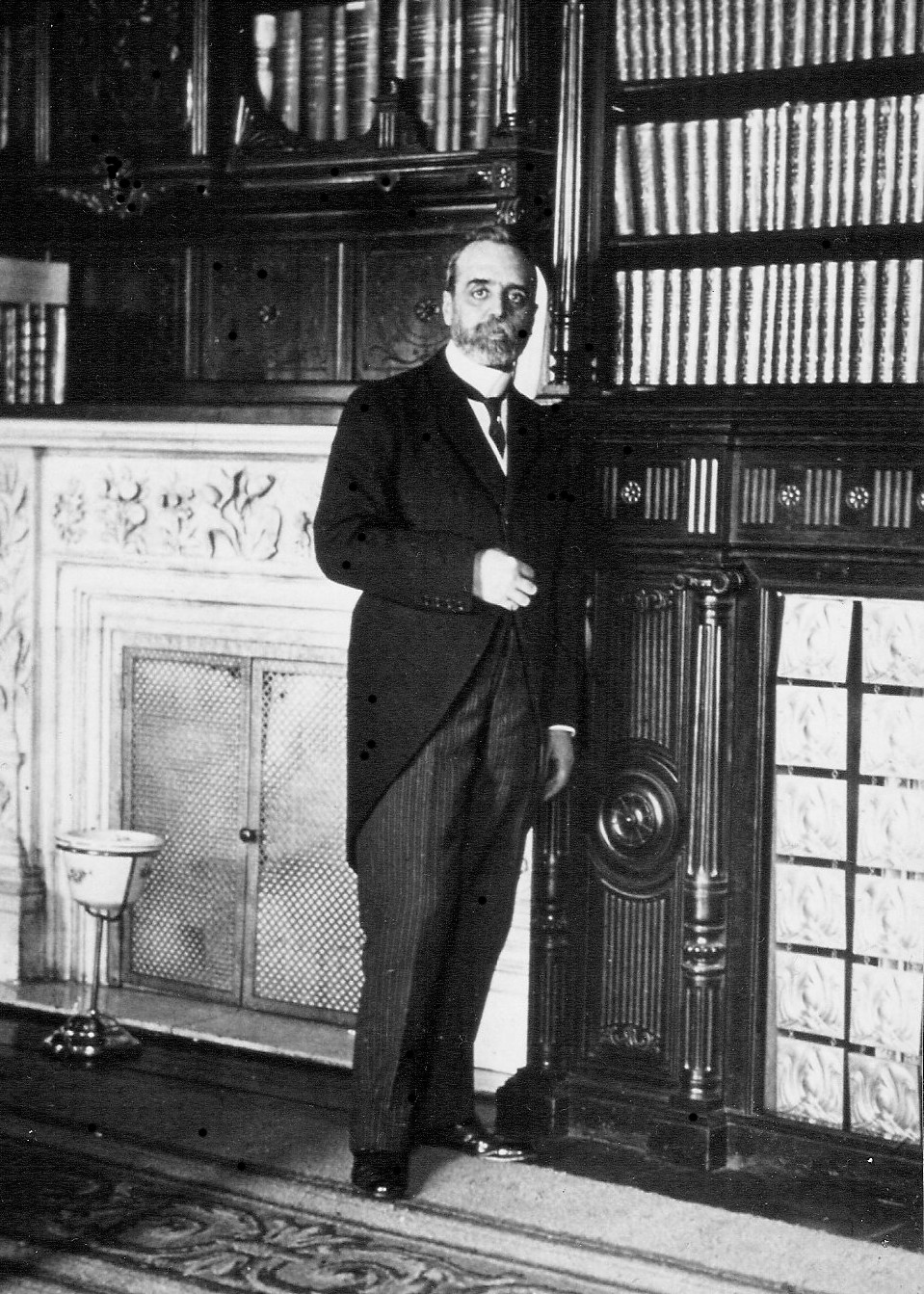
José Sánchez Guerra around 1920

Sánchez Guerra tried to confront the growing military interventionism and proposed to submit the Defence Juntas, then called "informative commissions", to civilian power, counting on the collaboration of the King, who in June 1922 in a meeting with the military of the garrison of Barcelona disavowed them. "The officer cannot get involved in politics", he said. The reformist, republican and socialist deputies, for their part, recalled the support the King had given to the Juntas in the past. Finally, in November 1922, the Courts passed a law dissolving the "informative commissions" and establishing strict rules to be followed for promotions for war merits, thus meeting one of the demands of the Juntas. In this way, the unity of the Africanist and Junteros officers of the Spanish Army was reestablished. Another civilian measure was the removal of General Severiano Martínez Anido from his post as civil governor in Barcelona.

General Picasso presented his report on the "disaster of Annual" which was devastating since in it he denounced the fraud and corruption that had taken place in the administration of the protectorate of Morocco, as well as the lack of preparation and the improvisation of the commanders in the conduct of the military operations, without safeguarding the governments that had not provided the Army with the necessary material means. Based on what was reported in the Picasso File, the Supreme Council of War and Navy ordered the prosecution of thirty six chiefs and officers, together with the High Commissioner, General Berenguer, General Fernandez Silvestre, if he was alive because his corpse had not been found, and General Navarro, prisoner of Abd el-Krim.

Again, the harshest intervention when the issue was debated in Congress was that of the socialist deputy Indalecio Prieto who accused the Minister of War, Viscount of Eza, and above all the King of being the most responsible for what had happened, an accusation for which he was prosecuted. Prieto, among other things, said:

One of the most serious responsibilities assumed by all the parties that have taken turns in this period of the monarchy is that of their adulation, that of their lack of constitutionalism, that of not having known how to frame everyone, including the King, within their constitutional duties.

The debate on the responsibilities made evident the division among the conservatives, which provoked the crisis of the government that ended with the formation in December 1922 of a new one of "liberal concentration" presided by Manuel García Prieto, which was going to be the last constitutional government of the reign of Alfonso XIII.

==== Last constitutional government of the Monarchy of Alfonso XIII (December 1922 – September 1923) ====
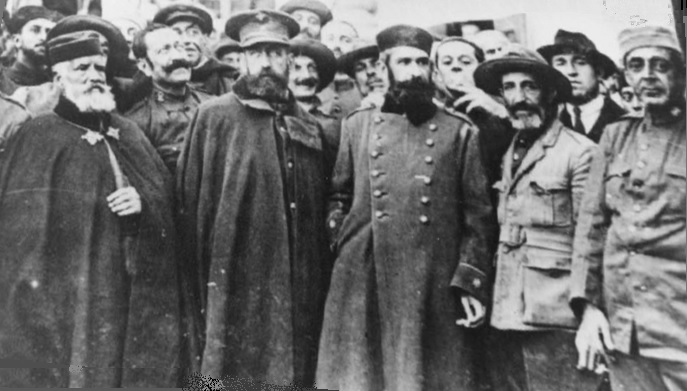
Spanish chiefs and officers after being released after the negotiations that the government of García Prieto held with Abd el-Krim and that a sector of the Spanish army described as "unworthy".

The government of "liberal concentration" presided by Manuel García Prieto announced its intention to advance in the process of responsibilities —in July 1923 the Senate granted the supplication to be able to prosecute General Berenguer since he had parliamentary immunity as he was a member of that Parliament—. Likewise, he tried to reaffirm the primacy of civilian power over the military in the two pending issues, Catalonia and Morocco. He also proposed a very ambitious project of reform of the political regime which would lead to the birth of a true parliamentary Monarchy, although in the elections he convened at the beginning of 1923 there was again widespread fraud and resort to the cacique machinery to ensure a majority. However, the anti-system parties made progress, especially the PSOE, which obtained a resounding victory in Madrid, where it won seven seats. In the end, however, the government was unable to carry out its plans for reform and accountability because on September 13, 1923, General Miguel Primo de Rivera, Captain General of Catalonia, led a coup d'état in Barcelona that put an end to the liberal regime of the Restoration. King Alfonso XIII did not oppose the coup.

== Dictatorship of Primo de Rivera (1923–1930) ==
=== "Dictatorship with a King" ===
On September 13, 1923, the captain general of Catalonia, Miguel Primo de Rivera, revolted against the government and staged a coup d'état. Thus was born the "dictatorship with a King", an expression coined by the historian Santos Juliá to highlight the fact that the final fate of Primo de Rivera's military coup was decided by King Alfonso XIII, who did not support the government and ceded power to it, just as the King of Italy, Victor Emmanuel III, had done a year earlier, when he did not sign the decree declaring a state of siege to prevent the "march on Rome" of the Fascists from triumphing and appointed their leader Mussolini, head of the government. It is not by chance that shortly after the establishment of the Dictatorship, Alfonso XIII said to Victor Emmanuel III during an official visit to Italy: I already have "my Mussolini".

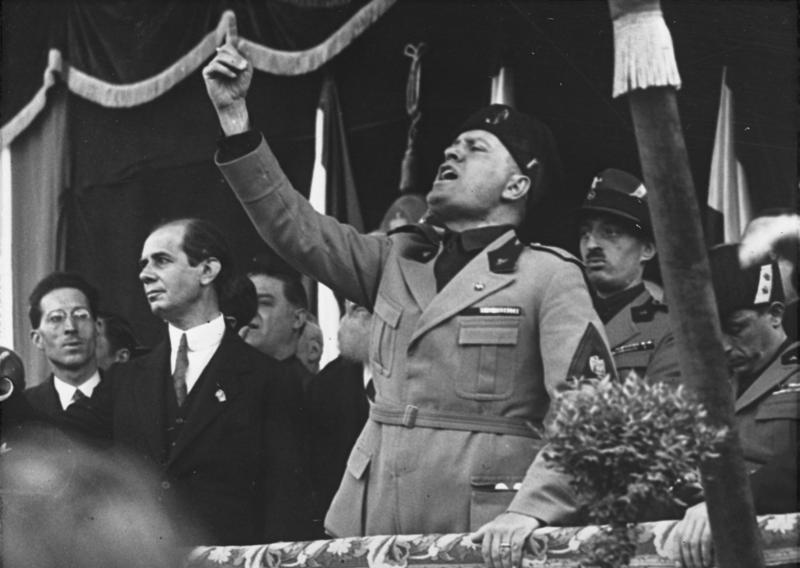
The Italian fascist dictator Benito Mussolini in 1930.

After the acceptance of Primo de Rivera's coup d'état, the King no longer acted as a constitutional monarch, but as head of state of a new political formula of "dictatorship with a King". That Alfonso XIII was no longer a constitutional monarch was proved by the presidents of the Senate, Count of Romanones, and of the Congress of Deputies, Melquiades Álvarez, when three months after the coup they reminded the King that the Constitution of 1876 obliged him to call elections —which the King did not do—. They were dismissed abruptly by means of a decree signed by Primo de Rivera and countersigned by the King. Primo de Rivera justified it in this way:

The country is no longer impressed with movies of liberal and democratic essences; it wants order, work and economy.

In principle, the Dictatorship was to be a temporary regime —Primo de Rivera said that its purpose was to remain only "ninety days" long enough to "regenerate" the country—, but it lasted six years and four months.

=== Military Directory (1923–1925) ===
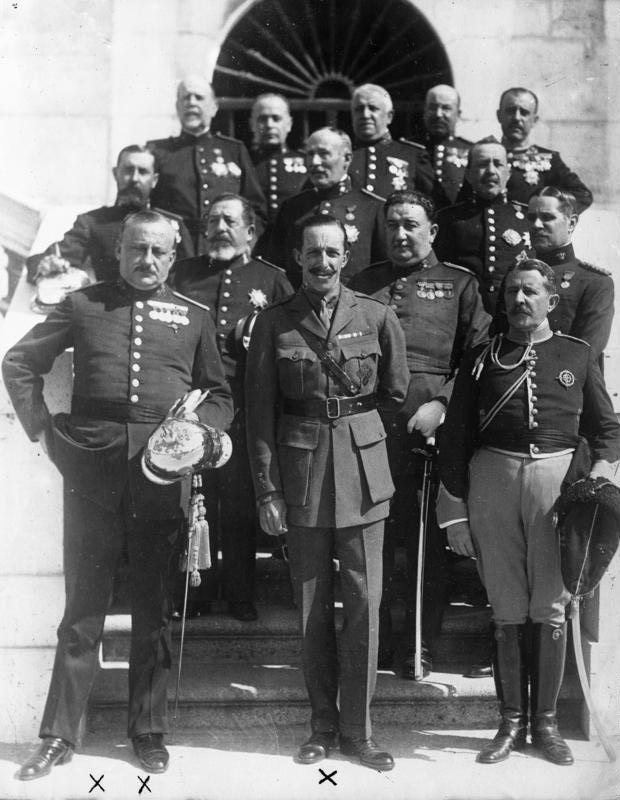
From left to right (in bold the generals members of the Military Directory and in brackets the number of the military region they represent; in italics, the four generals members of the Quadrilateral): General Primo de Rivera, King Alfonso XIII, and General José Cavalcanti de Alburquerque, in the first row; General Antonio Mayandía Gómez (5th.) General Antonio Mayandía Gómez (5th), General Federico Berenguer Fusté and General Leopoldo Saro Marín, in the second row; General Antonio Dabán Vallejo, General Francisco Ruiz del Portal (7th) and General Luis Navarro y Alonso de Celada (3rd); in the third row General Luis Hermosa y Kith (2nd), General Dalmio Rodríguez Pedré (4th), General Adolfo Vallespinosa Vior (1st), General Francisco Gómez-Jordana Sousa (6th), and General Mario Muslera y Planes (8th), in the last row.

==== Reestablishment of "social peace" ====
The first measure taken by the Directory was the dismissal of the provincial and local authorities (civil governors, mayors, presidents of the deputations) who were replaced by the military, whose first mission was the reestablishment of public order by the expeditious method of declaring a state of war, which entailed the suspension of constitutional guarantees (such as the inviolability of the home, freedom of assembly and association, and so on) and the attribution to military jurisdiction of "political crimes" —including the displaying of non-national flags or the use of non-Spanish languages in official acts— and a good part of common crimes. Another of the first decisions of the Directory also had to do with public order: by means of a decree of September 17, the Catalan institution of the Somatén was extended to all the provinces of Spain.

The declaration of the state of war led to the reestablishment of "social peace". The pistolerismo almost completely disappeared (only 51 attacks were registered between 1923 and 1928, compared to 1,259 from 1919 to 1923) and the number of strikes was reduced, which also contributed to the economic growth experienced in the "Roaring Twenties".

The policy followed by the Dictatorship with the two large workers' organizations was very different. Primo de Rivera tried to attract the Socialists, provoking a division within them between those in favor of collaboration with the Dictatorship, led by Julián Besteiro, Francisco Largo Caballero and Manuel Llaneza, and those against, led by Indalecio Prieto and Fernando de los Ríos. The position of the former won and the Socialists were integrated into the Labor Council as a result of the absorption by this new body of the Institute of Social Reforms, and even Largo Caballero was part of the Council of State, causing Prieto's resignation from the PSOE executive. On the other hand, the policy of the Dictatorship towards the CNT was repression, so the anarchist organization went underground.

==== "Dismantling of the caciquismo". ====
Primo de Rivera considered himself the "iron surgeon" who was to achieve the "dismantling of the caciquismo" of which Joaquín Costa had spoken at the beginning of the century. Thus, in addition to re-establishing "social peace", the other objective assigned to the new provincial and local military authorities was to "regenerate" public life by putting an end to the cacique networks, once the "oligarchy" of the politicians of the day had already been dislodged from power. The new civil governors, all of them military, were in charge of investigating cases of corruption, admitting at first anonymous complaints, and to assist the governors, government delegates, also military, were appointed in each judicial district —more than eight hundred local corporations were investigated and more than one hundred files were opened for having detected irregularities in them—.

However, in practice, the measure of appointing government delegates was "not very effective" because among them "there were also cases of corruption" "and some of them even became real caciques". In fact, "the fundamental reason for the crisis of caciquismo during the period of the Dictatorship was the marginalization of the parties of the day from power for so long", although many caciques found refuge in the single party of the Dictatorship, the Patriotic Union.

The political reform at the local level culminated with the enactment of the Municipal Statute of 1924, promoted by the then Director General of Local Administration, the former Maurista José Calvo Sotelo. The preamble of the Statute stated that "the State, in order to be democratic, must rely on free municipalities", but the mayors continued to be appointed by the Government, and not elected by the residents.

Another step in the "dismantling of the caciquismo" was the dissolution of the provincial deputations in January 1924, with the exception of those of the Basque Country and Navarre. The civil governors were left in charge of appointing their new members from among liberal professionals and businessmen, which provoked the disaffection of the members of the Regionalist League headed by Josep Puig i Cadafalch, who at first had believed in the regionalist goodwill of Primo de Rivera, since those appointed to the four Catalan deputations, as in the town councils, were "Spanishists", coming mostly from the National Monarchist Union.

==== Patriotic Union: an "apolitical" party ====
At the beginning of 1924, the idea began to be forged that it was not enough to "regenerate" the country to put an end to the "oligarchy" and "dismantle the caciquismo", but that it was also necessary a "new policy", which would rely on "people of solid ideas" and men "of good faith" who would form a "political party, but apolitical, that would exercise a political-administrative action". A political force that would not define the objectives and policies to be applied, but would take charge of the administration of the State, putting into practice the regenerationist motto of "less politics, more administration".

This is how the Patriotic Union was born in April 1924, although the first "patriotic unions" had arisen spontaneously in the circles of political Catholicism. Primo de Rivera defined the Patriotic Union as "a central, monarchical, temperate and serenely democratic party" and later gave it a trilemma, in the Carlist manner: "Nation, Religion and Monarchy". One of its ideologists, the writer José María Pemán, took care to differentiate it from fascism and affirmed that the State defended by the Patriotic Union was the "traditional social-Christian" one, and that it also rejected universal suffrage, which he considered "a great mistake". The party was made up of people from the traditional Catholic right wing —antiliberal and anti-democratic—, from "maurism" and other conservative sectors, "apolitical" of all kinds and also simple opportunists.

The Patriotic Union was a party "organized from the power and by the power" (as recognized by José Calvo Sotelo), and for its constitution the dictator made use of a political formation in development that came from the anti-liberal and anti-democratic non-Carlist Catholic world, more specifically, the one linked to the National Catholic Association of Propagandists, headed by Ángel Herrera Oria, which had been precisely the organization that had promoted the first "patriotic unions" with the aim of constituting the great party of the Catholic right.

The base of the Patriotic Union was fundamentally local and provincial, and the National board of directors created in 1926 never had very precise functions. More important as a binder of the party was the role of the newspaper La Nación, the press organ of the Unión Patriótica supported with funds from the Administration.

On the other hand, the effectiveness of the Patriotic Union in the "dismantling of the caciquismo" was actually reduced, because "it incorporated in its ranks many former caciques and allowed the creation of new cacicazgos", as in the case of the province of Cadiz, cradle of Primo de Rivera, "where practically all the traditional caciques were integrated in the Patriotic Union".

==== Strengthening of Spanish nationalism and the fight against "separatism". ====
In the "Manifesto" of September 13, reference was made to the "shameless separatist propaganda" as one of the justifications for the coup. Five days later the Directory promulgated the Decree of September 18, 1923 against "separatism", which punished with severe penalties the "crimes against the security and unity of the Homeland", judged by military tribunals. Thus, the Dictatorship opted from the first moment for "an authoritarian and belligerent Spanish nationalism. Symbols and entities related to other nationalisms were persecuted. Censorship reduced to the minimum expression not only the democratic and workers' press, but also publications in other languages. Political activities were severely limited and, in general, sub-state nationalisms and regionalisms entered into a forced eclipse, which would last until 1929".

In Catalonia, it soon became clear that the Regionalist League was wrong to support Primo de Rivera's coup, since he immediately carried out a policy of persecution of Catalan nationalism. Among other measures, Catalan was prohibited in official acts, attempts were made to suppress the use of Catalan in sermons and religious ceremonies, Spanish was imposed as the only administrative language, Catalan place names were Spanishified and changed, the Jocs Florals were boycotted —which had to be held abroad—, the raising of the Catalan flag was prohibited, the dancing of sardanas was limited, professional, trade union and sports institutions were persecuted simply for using Catalan, and so on. This policy generated numerous conflicts with various Catalan institutions and Catalanist entities that refused to accept it, and many of them ended up being closed temporarily or permanently. It was the case, for example, of some premises of the Regionalist League that were closed and that of its newspaper La Veu de Catalunya that was temporarily suspended.

In January 1924 Primo de Rivera met in Barcelona with some Catalan political leaders but only obtained the support of the "Spanishist" National Monarchist Union, whose leader Alfonso Sala Argemí became president of the Mancomunitat after the resignation of Puig i Cadafalch. However, Sala ended up confronting the military authorities of Catalonia and protested by letter to Primo de Rivera. Thus, when in March 1925 the Provincial Statute was approved, which in practice prohibited the Mancomunitat, Sala resigned.

After the disappearance of the Mancomunitat, Primo de Rivera's statements on the culture, identity, language and institutions of Catalonia grew in virulence, expressing his total opposition to any kind of regional autonomy. As historian Genoveva García Queipo de Llano has pointed out, "Primo de Rivera offended not only political groups but the whole of Catalan society". Thus, there was a growing estrangement between Catalonia and the Dictatorship, with conflicts progressively increasing. Acció Catalana took the "Catalan case" to the League of Nations and Francesc Macià, a former military man and founder of Estat Catalá, became the symbol of Catalonia's resistance to the Dictatorship.

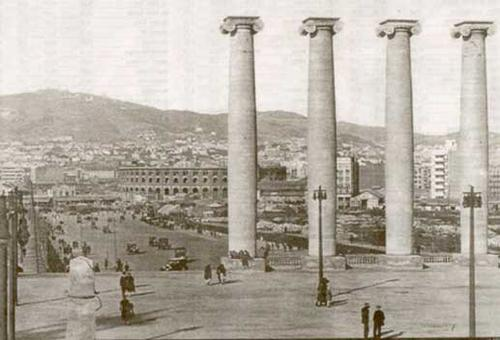
The Four Columns representing the four bars of the Catalan flag, work of the architect Puig i Cadafalch for the International Exposition of Barcelona (1929).

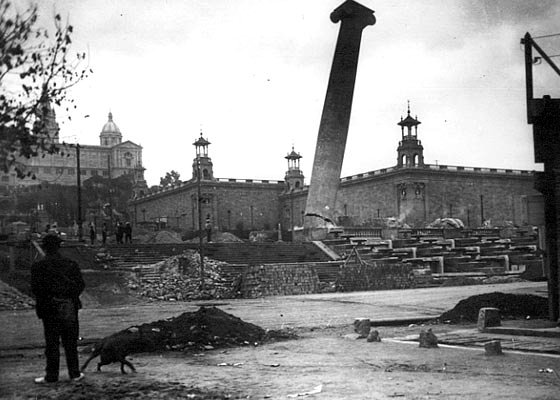

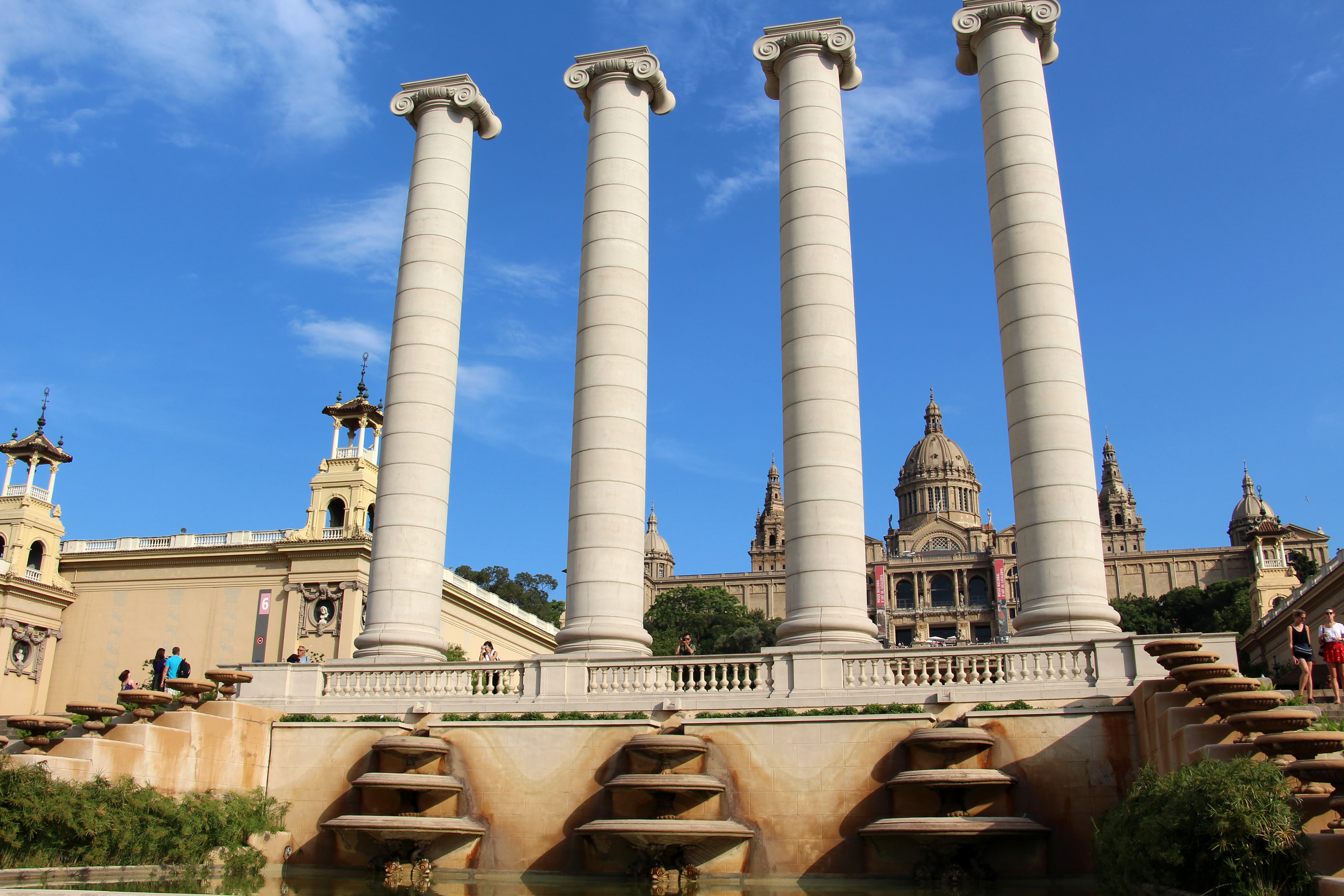
The four columns were rebuilt and placed near their original location in 2011.

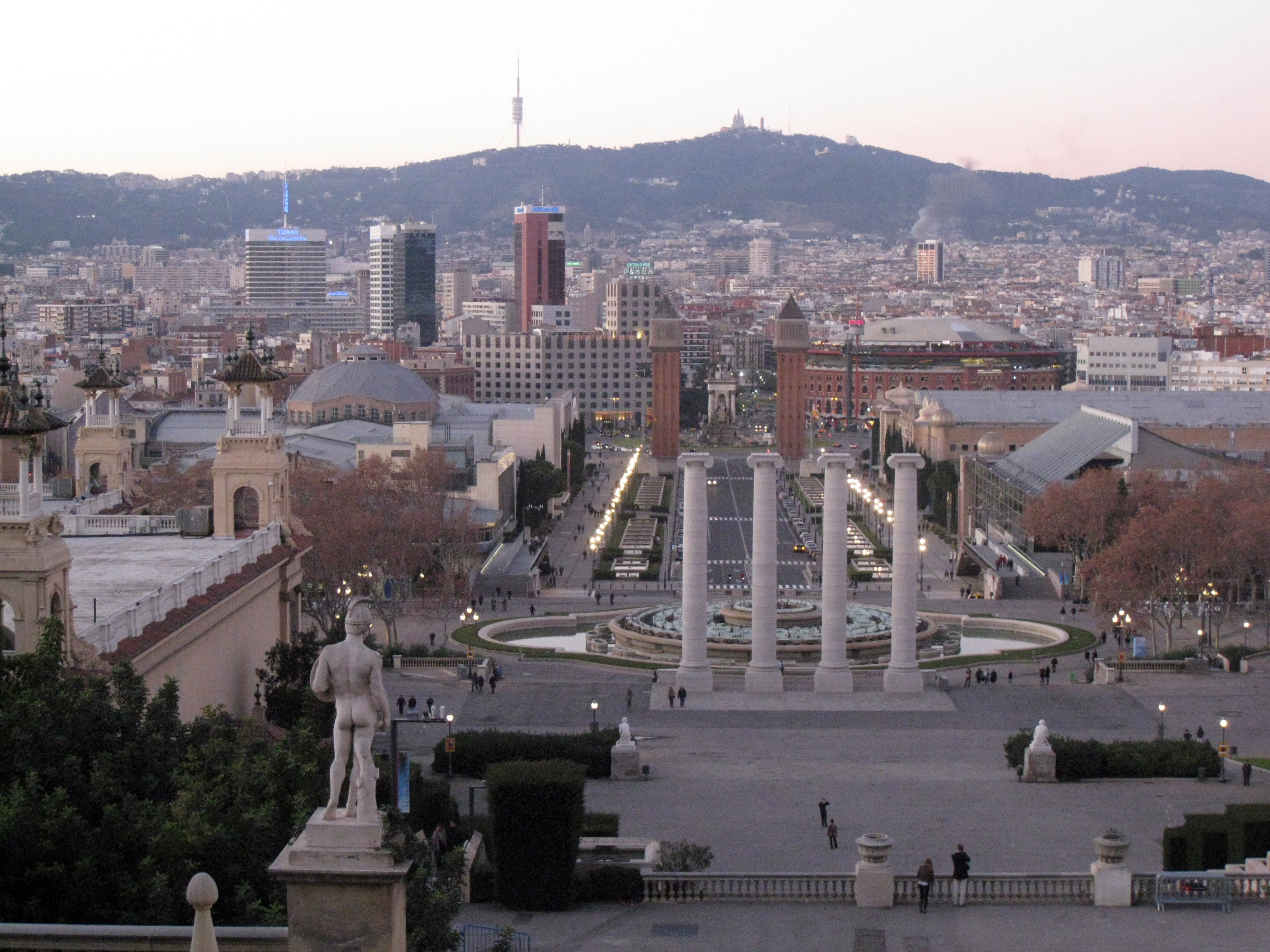
The four columns today as seen from the National Palace of Montjuic.

==== Pacification of Morocco ====
Regarding the "Morocco problem", General Primo de Rivera had always expressed an "abandonment" position, so he ordered the withdrawal of the troops to the coastal strip of the Spanish Protectorate of Morocco, with the consequent discomfort of the "Africanist" sector of the Army. Among them was Lieutenant Colonel Francisco Franco who wrote several articles in the Revista de Tropas Coloniales in defense of Spanish colonialism. One of the underlying reasons for the opposition to the "abandonment" of Morocco was that the withdrawal meant the end of the rapid promotions for "war merits", which had allowed the officers stationed in Africa to be promoted more quickly than those in the peninsular garrisons. This was the case of Lieutenant Colonel Franco himself, who requested a posting in the African Army when he graduated (in the "regulars", first in Melilla and then in Ceuta), and in only five years (from 1912 to 1917) he was promoted from lieutenant to commander for "war merits". When Lieutenant Colonel Millán Astray organized the Foreign Legion in 1920 (following the French model), he appointed Major Franco as commander of one of its battalions. In 1922, Franco published Morocco, diary of a Flag, where he recounted his experience in the Legion. That same year, the conservative media, such as the ABC newspaper, put him as an example of a "soldier", in the face of the anti-militarist campaign that was unleashed after the "disaster of Annual". In 1923 he was head of the Legion and was promoted to lieutenant colonel. When Primo de Rivera finally decided to resume the war in Morocco, Lieutenant Colonel Franco, like other "Africanist" officers, changed his attitude and became staunch supporters of the Dictatorship. Lieutenant Colonel Franco was promoted in only three years to colonel and from colonel to general. He was 33 years old. If there had been no war, he would still be a captain, says historian Gabriel Cardona.

In March 1924 Primo de Rivera ordered the withdrawal of troops from the area of Yebala and Xauen, which would shorten the lines. But the withdrawal was made in very bad weather conditions and was taken advantage of by Abd el-Krim, the leader of the self-proclaimed Republic of the Rif, to launch an offensive, so the operation was a catastrophe. There were more casualties than in the disaster of Annual three years earlier, although with a lower number of deaths, and Abd el-Krim seized a good part of the Spanish protectorate. Primo de Rivera managed to hide the magnitude of the disaster from public opinion thanks to censorship, but in October 1924 he had to personally assume the position of Spanish High Commissioner in Morocco. Only the mistake of the Rifian rebels to attack the French positions in the spring of 1925 allowed Primo de Rivera to save the situation.

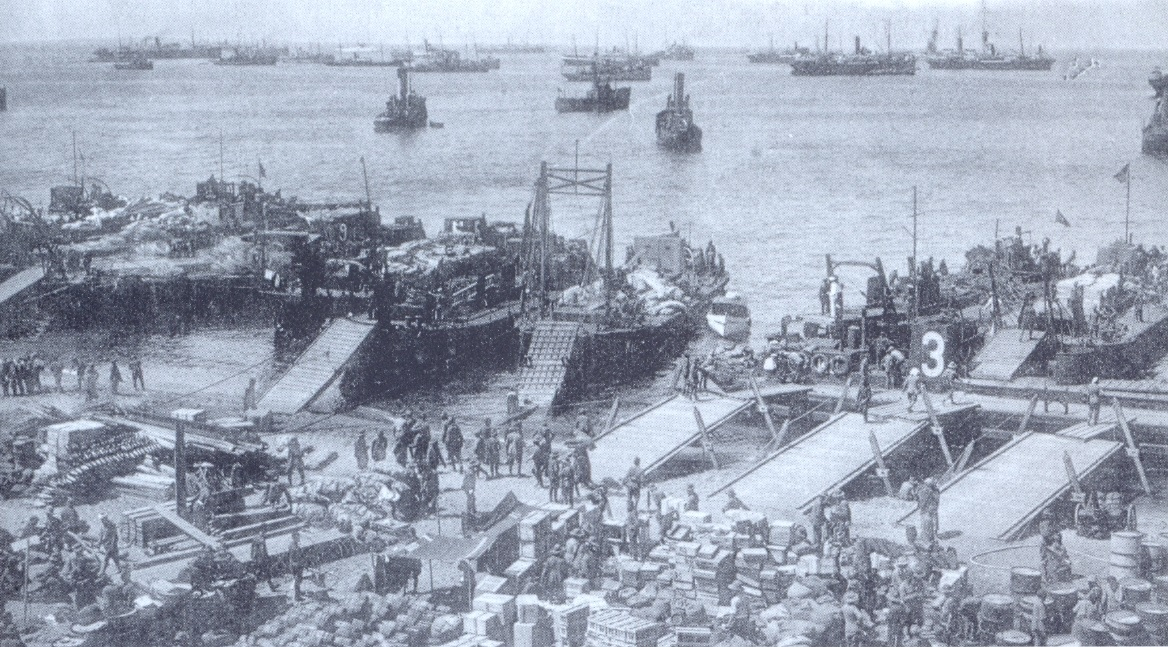
Landing of Al Hoceima, September 1925

Indeed, Abd el-Krim's attack on the areas of Morocco under French protectorate was enough for France for the first time to show its willingness to collaborate with Spain to put an end to the Rifian rebellion. From this collaboration arose the project of the Al Hoceima landing which took place in September 1925 and was a complete success as it caught the enemy from behind and split in two the area controlled by the rebels. Thus in April 1926, Abd el-Krim requested negotiations and the following year Morocco was completely pacified, ceasing to be a problem for Spain. In his obsession not to fall into the hands of the Spanish army, Abd el-Krim surrendered to the French who deported him to Reunion Island.

According to Genoveva García Quiepo de Llano,

The victory in Morocco was undoubtedly the most spectacular triumph of Primo de Rivera's government, and laid the foundations for the Dictatorship's foreign policy in the future. General Primo de Rivera's will to remain in power from 1925 onwards, despite the fact that he himself had indicated the provisional nature of his regime, was precisely that he had solved a problem that had been the nightmare of all Spanish rulers since 1898.

On the other hand, as Santos Juliá has pointed out, "once the direction of the war had been handed over to the Africanists, it made no sense to continue with the vexed issue of responsibilities, which was definitively shelved".

=== Civil Directory (1925–1930) ===
As the historian Ángeles Barrio has pointed out, "the popularity that the success of the African campaign had given Primo de Rivera allowed him to take a step forward in the continuity of the regime, to return the army to the barracks and to undertake a civilian phase of the Directory. In fact, on December 13, 1925, Primo de Rivera formed his first civilian government, although the key posts —Presidency, occupied by himself, Vice-Presidency and Interior, by Severiano Martínez Anido, and War by Juan O'Donnell, Duke of Tetuán— were reserved for military personnel. In the same act of presentation of the government, in order to get out of the way of the speculations, more and more insistent in various sectors, about the need for a constitutional solution, Primo de Rivera made public his intention to keep the Constitution in abeyance and not to call elections".

With the Civil Directory, Primo de Rivera re-established the Council of Ministers with the traditional portfolios and with a composition half civilian and half military. The civilians belonged to the Unión Patriótica, and among them stood out "the rising stars of corporate authoritarianism: José Calvo Sotelo [a former "maurista" who in the previous two years had occupied the General Directorate of Local Administration] in Finance, Eduardo Aunós in Labor and the Count of Guadalhorce in Public Works". Another prominent minister was the conservative José Yanguas Messía.

According to Genoveva García Queipo de Llano, with the appointment of the Civil Directory Primo de Rivera, "affirmed his will to remain in power and did not mark out any precise path to exit the dictatorial regime".

==== Failed institutionalization of the regime ====
The first step towards the institutionalization of the regime was the foundation in April 1924 of the "single party" Unión Patriótica and the second step was the formation of the "Civil Directory" in December 1925. The next steps were the establishment of the National Corporate Organization and the convening of the National Consultative Assembly charged with drafting a new Constitution.

Primo de Rivera had promised the working class sectors an attitude of "paternal intervention" to improve their living and working conditions, resulting in the creation in November 1926 of the National Corporate Organization (OCN), an institution that would regulate relations between workers and employers under the "supervision" of the State, and whose promoter was the Minister of Labor Eduardo Aunós, a former member of the Regionalist League and defender of social Catholicism. The idea of the OCN was inspired by the social doctrine of the Church, although it was also influenced by the Fascist corporate model, given the "tutelary" role granted to the State. According to Ángeles Barrio, the OCN's ultimate goal was to guarantee social peace through a policy of intervention in the world of work —what she calls "social corporatism"—.

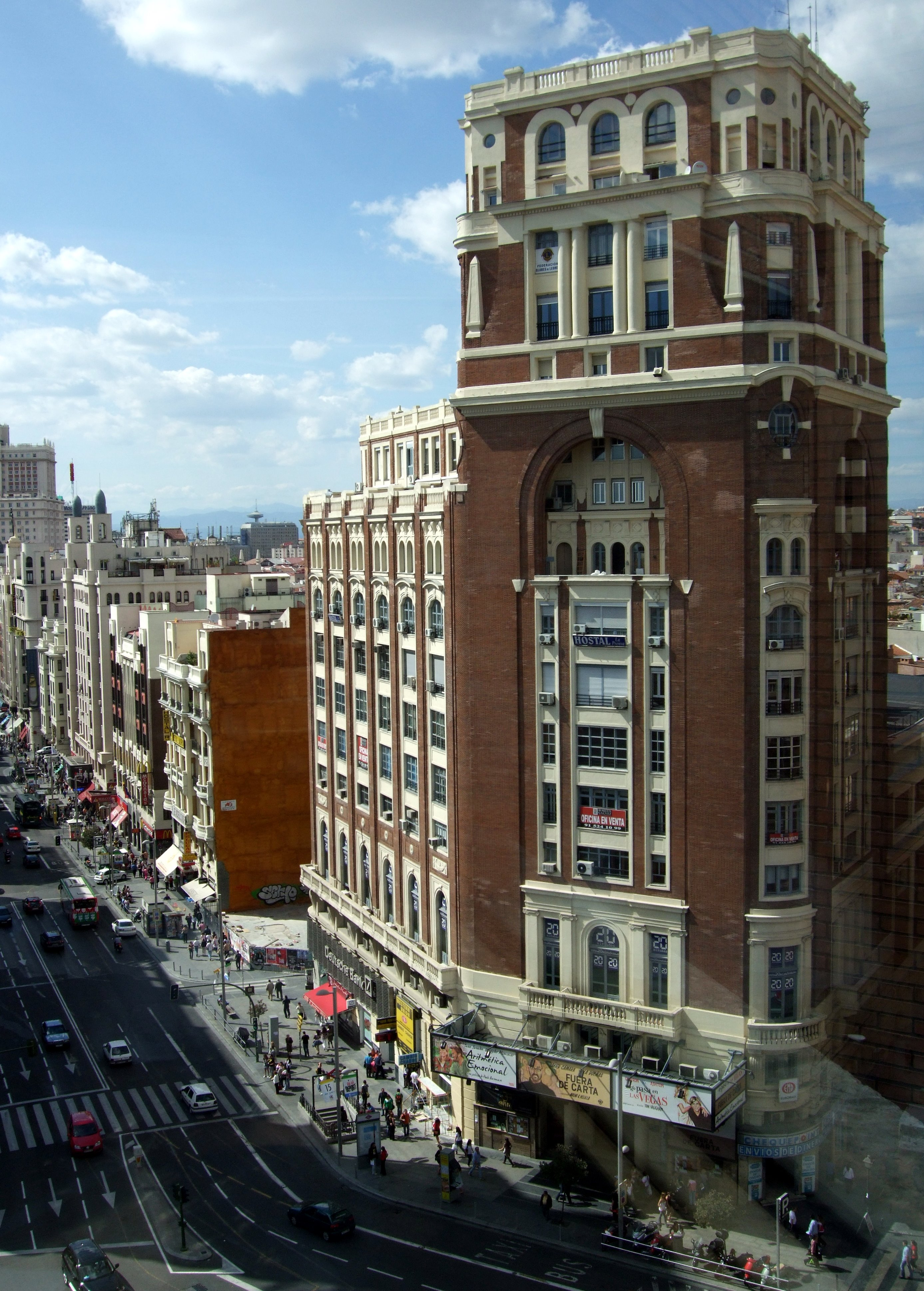
Palacio de la Prensa building on Madrid's Gran Vía, inaugurated in 1929.

The OCN consisted of a first tier formed by joint committees; a second tier constituted by the provincial mixed commissions and, finally, a third tier, formed by the corporation councils of each trade, which constituted the highest body. The representation of employers and workers was equal in each step —five on each side— and the presidential task was exercised by a representative of the government. Primo de Rivera offered the representation of the working class in the OCN to the socialist union, the Unión General de Trabajadores, which created an important element of internal division among the socialists, since the UGT accepted the offer. "The plan that Primo de Rivera proposed to the UGT was advantageous for the development and widening of its union bases and for its representativeness in the field of labor relations, as it had been disputing it with the CNT since the early years of the century," states Ángeles Barrio, but, as this same historian alleges, the collaboration of the UGT with the Dictatorship produced a deep fracture in Spanish socialism, since some leaders such as Indalecio Prieto or Fernando de los Ríos opposed it as unjustified and opportunistic.

On September 13, 1926, the third anniversary of the coup d'état that brought him to power, Primo de Rivera concluded a three-day informal event which he described as a "plebiscite" (plebiscito) to show that he had popular support and thus pressure the King to accept his proposal to convene an unelected Consultative Assembly. Rather than holding an election with a choice of voting yes or no, however, men (and for the first time, women) were invited to sign registration books at various locations if they supported Primo de Rivera, or to cast a signed ballot marking support into a box. There was no provision for opposing the regime.

For a year Alfonso XIII resisted, but in September 1927, he signed the convocation of the National Consultative Assembly which should "prepare and present to the government, in stages, within a period of three years and as a preliminary draft, a general and complete legislation which at the appropriate time should be submitted to a sincere contrast of public opinion and, in the appropriate part, to the royal sanction". This Assembly met in February 1928 and most of its nearly 400 members were appointed directly or indirectly by the government, and only about sixty had previously been deputies, senators or ministers.

In the Royal Decree-Law of September 12, 1927, which founded it, it was stated that "it is not to be a Parliament, it will not legislate, it will not share sovereignty", but a "body of information, controversy and advice of a general nature which will collaborate with the Government". It was "a corporative assembly, completely dependent on the executive power", "with members elected by the town councils, the provincial councils, the patriotic unions, the State bodies and outstanding representatives of the Administration, the army, the justice system or the Church together with other representatives of labor, commerce, culture, arts and other activities by the government, and intended to be the expression of a tripartite model of representation —Administration, Society and Party—which had its roots in classical corporativism and in Italian Fascist corporativism".

A strong setback for Primo de Rivera's project was the refusal of the socialists to participate in the National Consultative Assembly, in principle motivated because the posts had been assigned to them without election, but when Primo de Rivera later accepted that they should be elected by the UGT union, the socialists maintained their refusal. The socialist who most strongly opposed their participation was Indalecio Prieto, while Francisco Largo Caballero and Julián Besteiro continued to defend collaboration with the regime —Besteiro argued that why should the socialists not go to the Assembly if they had participated in the General Courts which, in his opinion, were as illegitimate as that one—. On the other hand, the Universities, increasingly at odds with the regime, did not send representatives either.

The first section of the Assembly, presided over by José Yanguas Messía, with José María Pemán as secretary, and Antonio Goicoechea, Víctor Pradera and César Silió, among its members, presented in the summer of 1928 a proposal for a Charter granted, as the reputed jurist Mariano Gómez described it, although it was presented as a preliminary draft of the "Constitution of the Spanish Monarchy", despite the fact that it broke completely with the history of Spanish constitutionalism.

The preliminary draft of the Constitution —called the Fundamental Statute of the Monarchy, drafted by José María Pemán, Gabriel Maura Gamazo and Juan de la Cierva— had a strongly authoritarian character since it limited the exercise of rights, did not establish the division of powers and only half of the Chamber (the only one) was elected by universal suffrage, while the other half was appointed by the "corporations" and by the King. The draft did not satisfy anyone, not even Primo de Rivera, due to the excessive weight given to the Crown. Thus, one year after its presentation, the draft bill was completely stalled, and the political debate was already focused on the opening of a true "constituent period".

As Genoveva García Queipo de Llano has pointed out, "what ended up ruining the Dictatorship as a political formula was its own inability to find an institutional formula different from that of the past".

==== Foreign policy ====
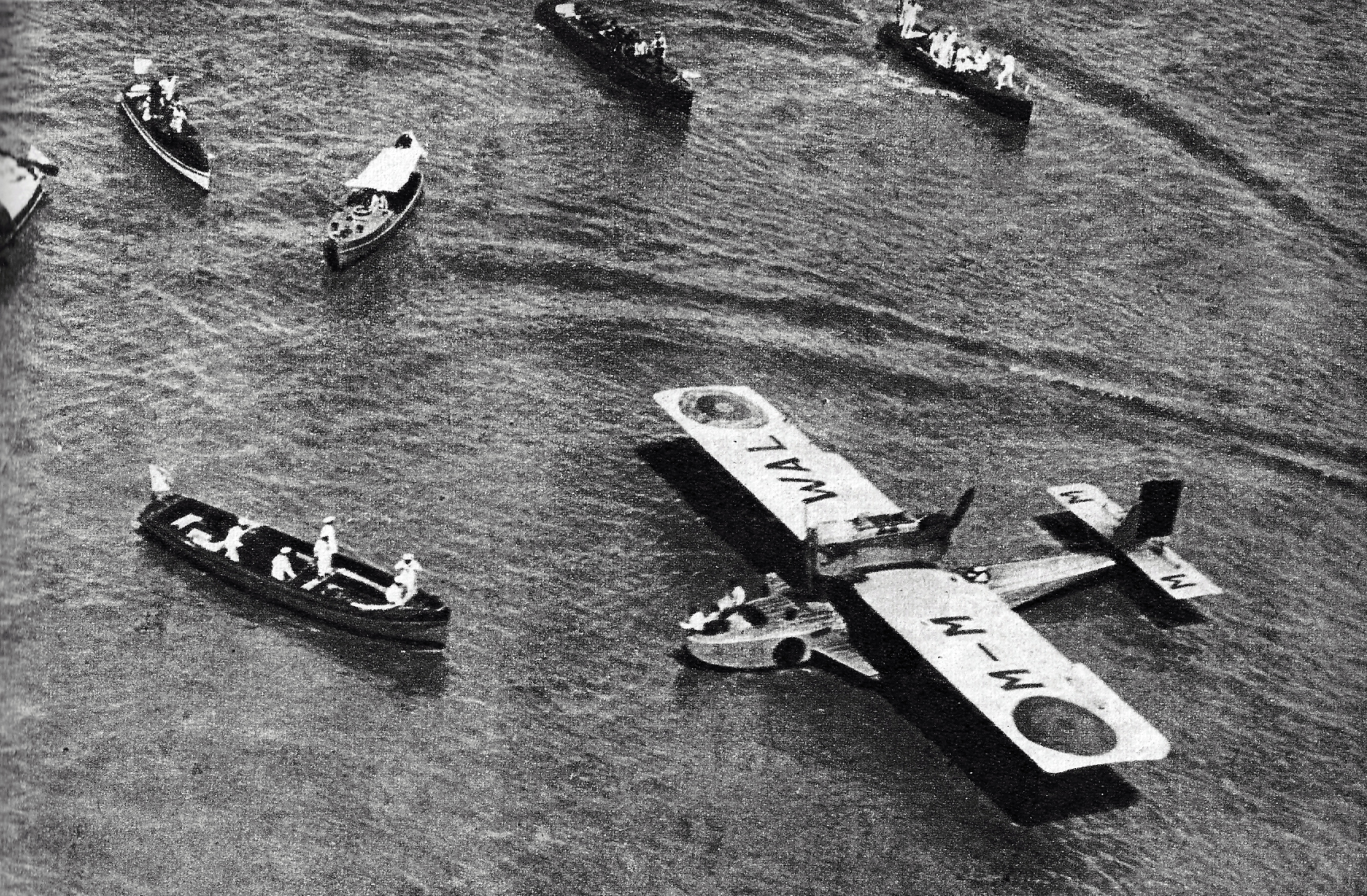
Landing of the Plus Ultra in the Río de la Plata, in front of Buenos Aires (January 1926).

The success in the pacification of Morocco after the landing of Al Hoceima prompted a more "aggressive" foreign policy. Primo de Rivera demanded that Tangier, a Moroccan city with an important Spanish community or of Spanish origin, be integrated into the Spanish Protectorate of Morocco. He was supported in this by Mussolini, which raised the suspicions of France and Great Britain, guarantors of Tangier's international status. At the same time he also demanded that Spain should have a permanent seat on the Council of the League of Nations, threatening to withdraw from the organization if it did not obtain it. But Primo de Rivera did not achieve either objective. As for Tangier he obtained some administrative and military concessions, but the city retained its international status, and as for the League of Nations, Primo de Rivera had to settle for one of its meetings to be held in Madrid.

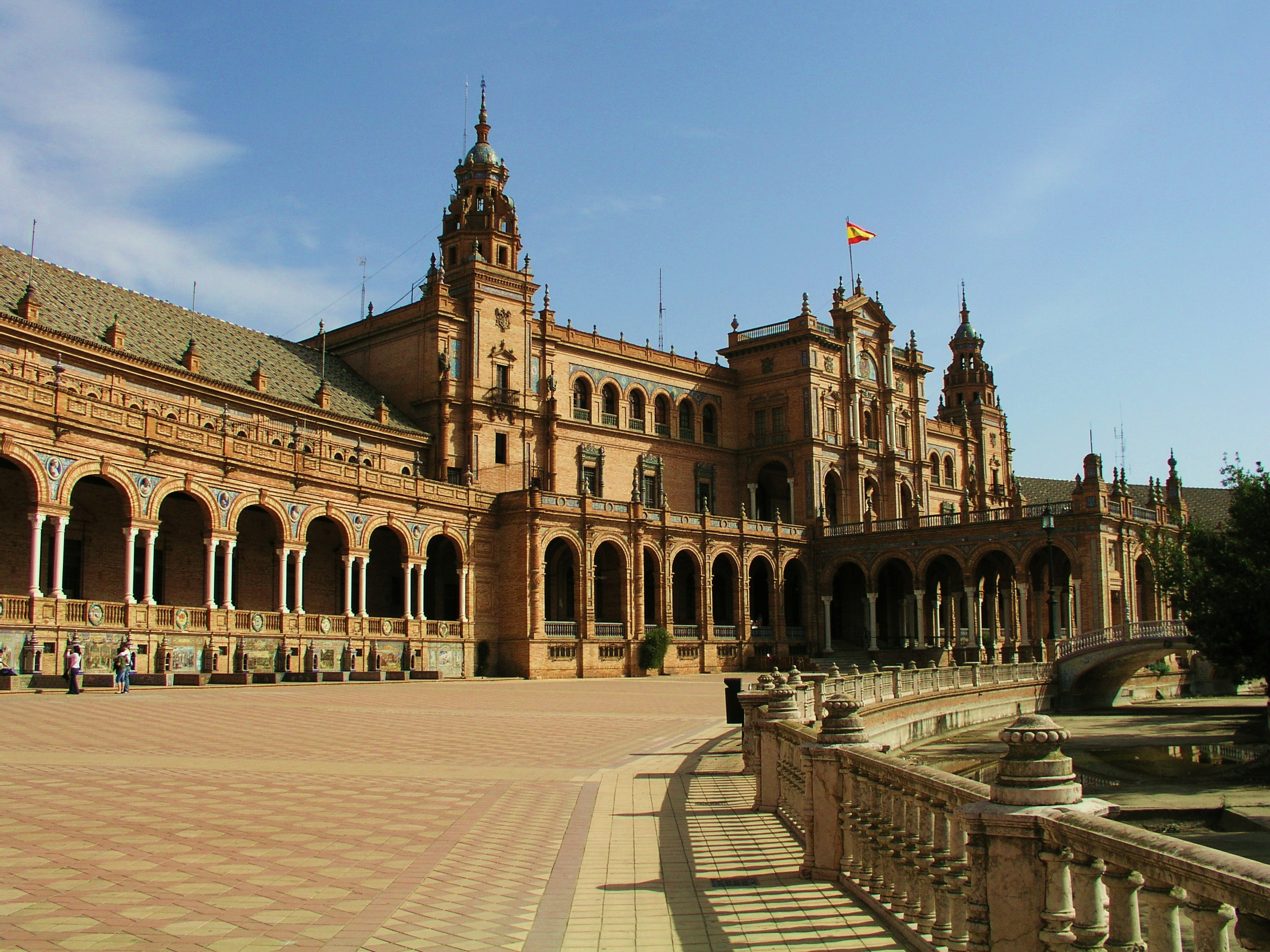
Plaza de España at the 1929 Ibero-American Exposition in Seville.

These failures led Primo de Rivera to reorient his foreign policy towards Portugal and Hispanic America, a term that began to spread at that time. Thus the Dictatorship sponsored the voyage of the Plus ultra, a seaplane piloted by Commander Ramón Franco, which left Palos de la Frontera on January 22, 1926, and arrived in Buenos Aires two days later, after a stopover in the Canary and Cape Verde Islands. A similar objective —to strengthen the ties between the "Mother Country" and the American republics— was pursued by the Ibero-American Exposition of Seville in 1929.

==== Economic policy ====
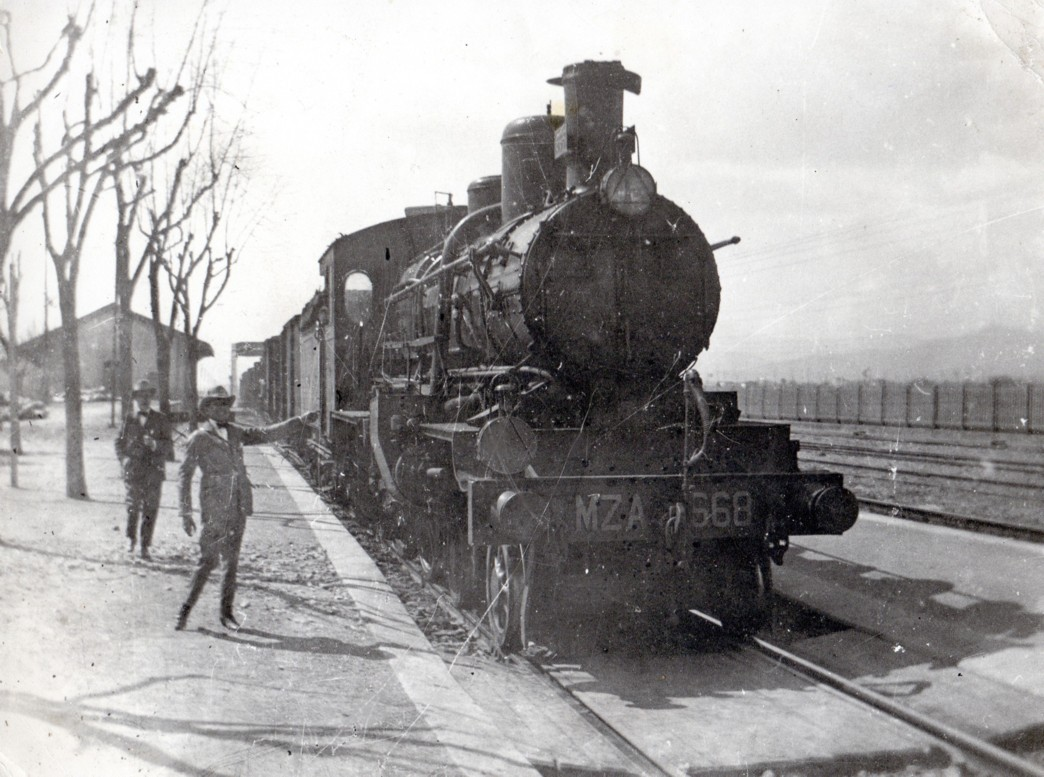
MZA locomotive, one of the most powerful of its time. The enlargement and modernization of the Spanish Communications Network was one of the trump cards of the primorriverist Dictatorship.

The Dictatorship focused its propaganda on economic achievements, but the truth is that the favorable international situation —the "Roaring Twenties"— had a lot to do with the remarkable economic growth that took place in those years. His economic policy was based on greater state intervention, through organizations such as the Council of National Economy created in 1924 (without whose permission, for example, no new industry could be set up), and on the protection of "national production". Two important achievements were the creation in June 1927 of Campsa, the Compañía Arrendataria del Monopolio de Petróleos, and the Compañía Telefónica Nacional de España, with majority capital from the North American ITT. But the interventionist economic policy of the Dictatorship was most evident in public works, from hydraulic works —for whose integral use (energy, irrigation and transport) the Confederaciones Hidrográficas were created— to roads (in 1926 the Circuito Nacional de Firmes Especiales was founded, which built some 7,000 kilometers of roads) and railroads. Electricity was also brought to the rural world. In reality, according to Ángeles Barrio, "extreme economic nationalism, interventionism and fear of competition were already traditional maxims of economic policy in Spain, and Primo de Rivera only made them develop and reach their maximum expression during the years of the dictatorship".

To finance the considerable increase in public spending that the dictatorship's interventionist economic policy entailed, no type of fiscal reform was implemented to increase income, so it was necessary to resort to the issuance of Debt, which produced a heavy foreign and domestic indebtedness, putting the stability of the peseta at risk.

=== Fall of the Dictatorship ===
Historian Genoveva García Queipo de Llano places the beginning of the decline of the Dictatorship in the middle of 1928, when several factors converged: the worsening of Primo de Rivera's diabetes, which soon after leaving power would lead to his death; the failure of the Dictatorship to establish a new regime; and the growing role of the opposition, joined by a sector of the Army which organized several armed conspiracies against the regime. Ángeles Barroso places it a little earlier, at the end of 1927, when with the constitution of the National Consultative Assembly it became clear that Primo de Rivera, in spite of the fact that from the beginning he had presented his regime as "temporary", had no intention of returning to the situation prior to September 1923.

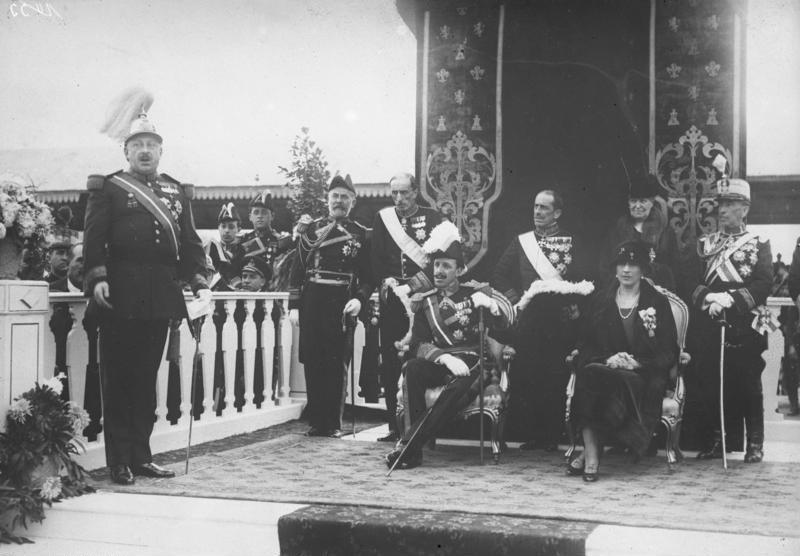
Primo de Rivera with the Spanish monarchs. In the last years of the dictatorship, the distance between the two grew, but the fall of Primo de Rivera would drag Alfonso XIII down.

The social and political sectors that had initially lent their support to the Dictatorship gradually withdrew it: the peripheral nationalisms when the Dictatorship failed to fulfill its promises of "decentralization" and ended up dissolving the Mancomunitat de Cataluña; the business organizations dissatisfied with the "interference" of the UGT in their companies —"the UGT strengthened its organizations and began to extend them to agriculture, which subverted the traditional relations between day laborers and employers in the countryside. In the cities, dominated by small and medium-sized employers, the rise of union power translated into obligations with respect to schedules, hierarchies of trades, definition of tasks and salaries they were not used to"; the intellectual and university sectors that abandoned their "benevolent expectations", disillusioned with their conservative "regenerationism"; various liberal social and political groups that saw how the Dictatorship intended to perpetuate itself in power, breaking its promise to be a "temporary regime"; and so on. The progressive loss of social support for the Dictatorship caused the King to begin "to consider that perhaps the Crown ran some risk if it continued to be tied to the figure of the dictator".

The conflict between the Dictatorship and the intellectuals had its first episode in 1924 when Primo de Rivera reprimanded several professors —Luis Jiménez de Asúa, Fernando de los Ríos— for having expressed their solidarity with Miguel Unamuno, who had been dismissed from his posts at the University of Salamanca and exiled to Fuerteventura, due to the criticism he had made of the dictatorial regime. The conflict was accentuated when many intellectuals supported the protests of the university students, which were answered by the Dictatorship expelling and banishing several of them, including the leader of the movement Antonio María Sbert. These student mobilizations were led by the Federación Universitaria Escolar (FUE), founded in 1929.

In the Army, the main conflict arose with the Artillery Corps, because of its complete disagreement with the open promotion scale —that is, promotions not only by seniority but also by merit— proposed by the Dictatorship. Primo de Rivera's response was, first, to suspend all the weapon's officers in September 1926 and, later, to dissolve it. Alfonso XIII tried to mediate in the conflict by proposing a kind of gentlemen's agreement, but Primo de Rivera radically opposed the pact, threatening to resign and reminding the King that the Army was under his command. The disbandment of the army aroused the solidarity of other military men with the artillerymen, even though they had initially supported the open scale of promotions. The King's final acceptance of the disbandment of the army was interpreted by the artillerymen as a connivance between Alfonso XIII and Primo de Rivera. "Since then, an important sector of the army adopted a republican position". Furthermore, "the conflict with the artillerymen did not fail to have repercussions in the following years, and the most important of them was that it accentuated the progressive distancing from the King".

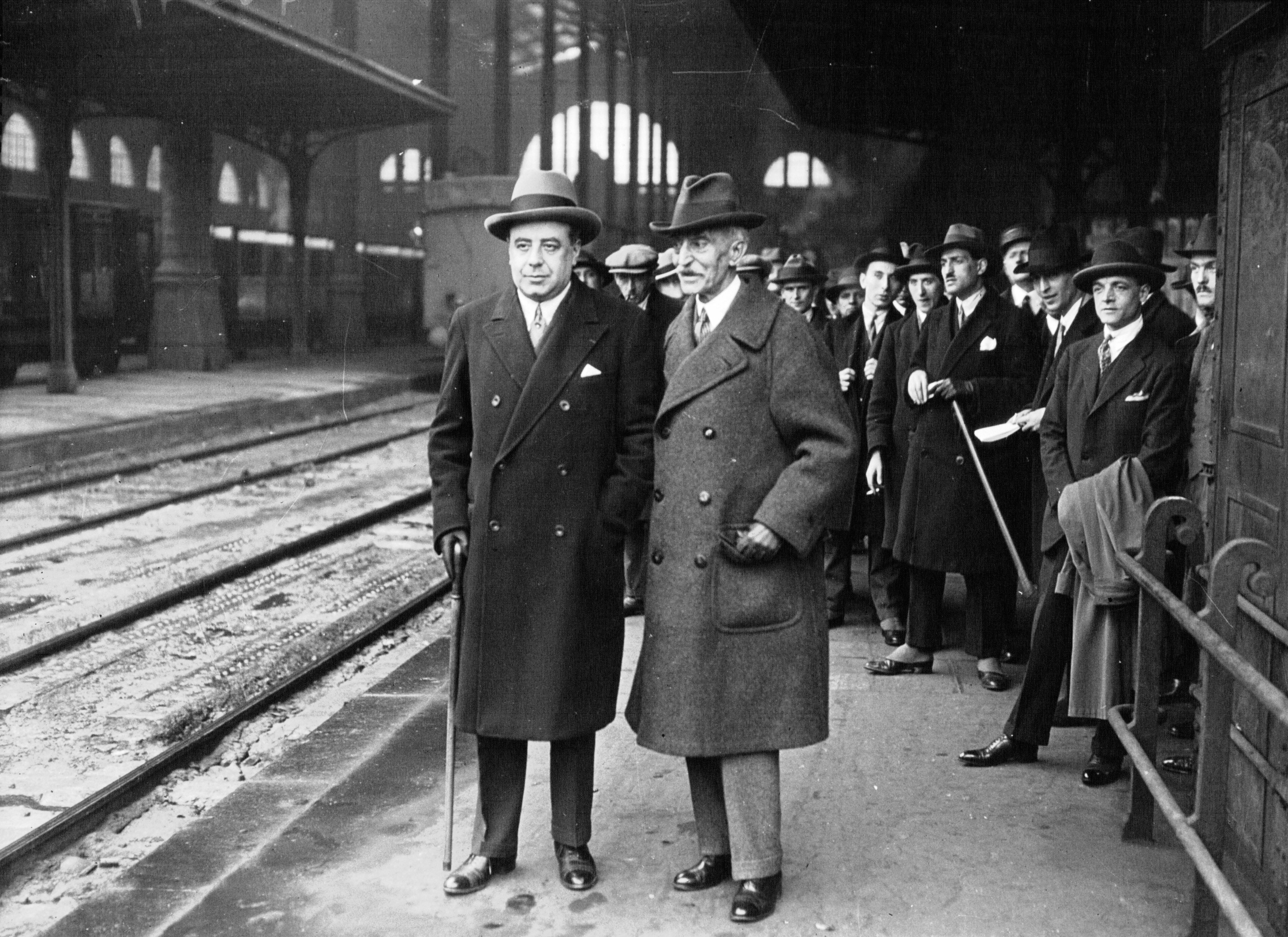
Francesc Macià (right) with his lawyer (left) about to leave Paris after the trial for the failed Prats de Molló plot

Between the two attempts came the so-called Prats de Molló plot, a failed invasion of Spain from French Catalonia led by Francesc Macià and his party Estat Catalá, and in which Catalan anarcho-syndicalist groups of the CNT collaborated.

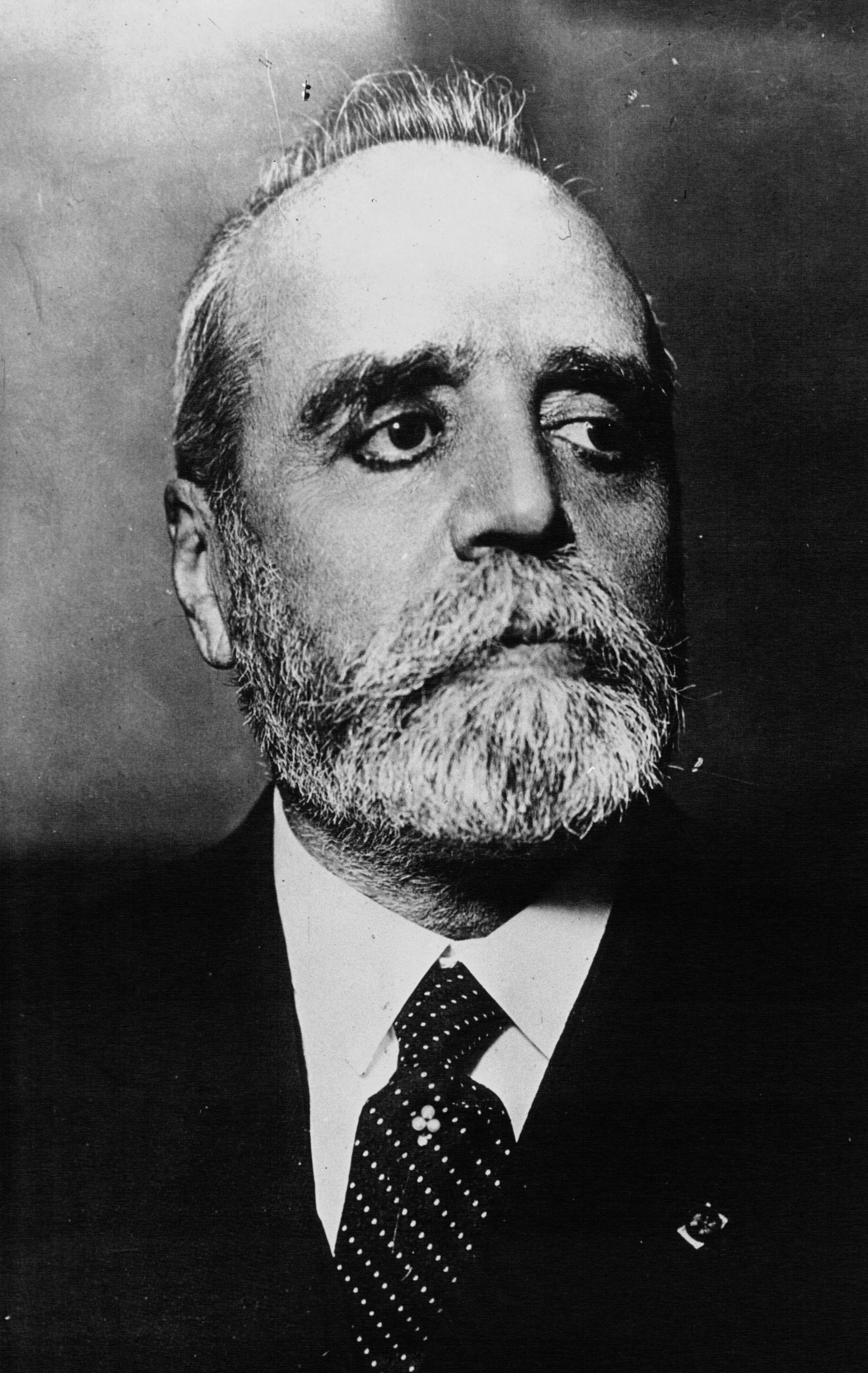
José Sánchez Guerra in 1932.

Attempted coups d'état were a novelty that had legitimized the Dictatorship itself —it was licit to resort to military force (the old pronunciamiento) to overthrow a government and change a regime— and "in this sense, the Dictatorship was like a return to 19th century politics," states Santos Juliá.

As the Dictatorship lost support, opposition groups grew. Among the members of the parties of the turn, of the old politics, who confronted the Dictatorship was the conservative José Sánchez Guerra, who, as he had promised, when the National Constituent Assembly was called, went into exile in Spain, and later participated in the attempted coup d'état of January 1929. But the parties of the turn as such, the Conservative Party and the Liberal Party, had practically disappeared as a consequence of their removal from power and the policy of the Dictatorship of "dismantling the caciquismo". Some of its members joined the Unión Patriótica and others, such as Sánchez Guerra or Manuel de Burgos y Mazo, of the Conservative Party, or Santiago Alba, of the Liberal Party, joined the Constitutional Bloc founded by the reformist Melquiades Álvarez, who advocated the abdication of Alfonso XIII and the calling of Constituent Courts. Others would openly join the Republican camp, such as Niceto Alcalá-Zamora and Miguel Maura Gamazo, who founded the Republican Liberal Right.

For their part, the Republicans were strengthened by the new Republican Action Group of Manuel Azaña —a former member of the Reformist Party of Melquiades Álvarez—, and reached unity of action with the "Republican Alliance", founded in February 1926, on the anniversary of the First Spanish Republic. The Alliance included the old Radical Republican Party of Alejandro Lerroux —from which in December 1929 the Radical-Socialist Republican Party of Marcelino Domingo and Álvaro de Albornoz split off— and the Federal Democratic Republican Party, together with the new formations of Azaña's Republican Action and the Catalan Republican Party, founded by Marcelino Domingo and Lluís Companys. As Ángeles Barrio has pointed out, "the importance of the Alliance lay in the fact that it represented a renewal of republicanism capable of achieving, as was demonstrated following the proclamation of the Second Spanish Republic, what had not been possible until then: to attract to the political project of the Republic a mainly urban, middle and lower middle class social base, as well as broad sectors of the workers".

Faced with the progressive loss of social and political support and the growth of the sectors opposed to the Dictatorship, to which was added a personal factor —his diabetes was worsening—-, Primo de Rivera tried to strengthen his position before the Crown and sought the direct support of the Army —the other pillar on which his power was based—. But the response of the general captains was too lukewarm —he had sent them a letter requesting their support to continue— so he presented his resignation to the King in January 1930, which was accepted on the spot. "Alfonso XIII, who had been for six years a King without a Constitution, named General Dámaso Berenguer [then head of the King's military household] president of the government with the purpose of returning to constitutional normality". After his resignation, Primo de Rivera left Spain and shortly after died in a modest hotel in Paris.

== "Dictablanda" of General Berenguer ==
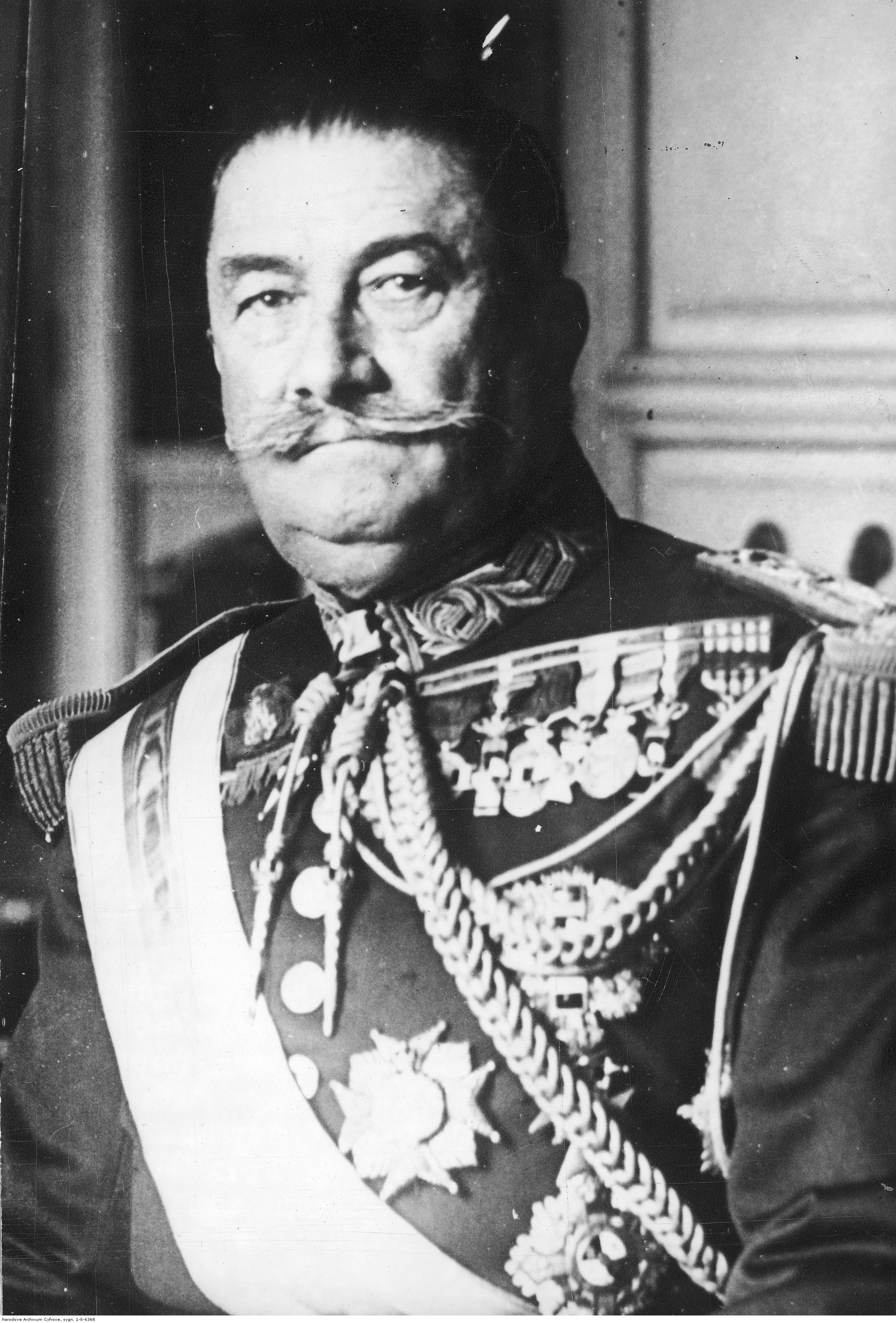
General Dámaso Berenguer

The order given by the King to General Berenguer to return to "constitutional normality" was not possible if what was intended was simply to return to the situation prior to Primo de Rivera's coup d'état of 1923, that is, without taking into account the link that had existed between the Crown and the Dictatorship. But that was the mistake made by the King and his government because since 1923 Alfonso XIII was a King without a Constitution, and his power during that time had not been legitimized by it, but by the coup d'état that the King accepted. The Monarchy had been linked to the Dictatorship and now pretended to survive when the Dictatorship had fallen.

General Berenguer had many problems in forming his government because the dynastic parties, the Liberal-Fusionist Party and the Conservative Party, after six years of Dictatorship had ceased to exist, since they were never real political parties but clientelist networks whose only purpose was to occupy power from time to time, due to the institutionalized electoral fraud of the cacique system. Most of the individual politicians of the parties of the time refused to collaborate, so Berenguer could only count on the most reactionary sector of conservatism headed by Gabino Bugallal. Thus, the Monarchy did not have at its disposal any political organization capable of leading the transition process.

The policy carried out by the Berenguer government did not help to "save" the Monarchy either. The slowness with which the liberalizing measures were approved cast doubt on whether the government's objective was really to reestablish "constitutional normality". For this reason, the press began to describe the new power as a "dictablanda". Then some politicians of the dynastic parties defined themselves as "monarchists without a king" (such as Ángel Ossorio y Gallardo) and others went over to the republican camp (Miguel Maura, son of Antonio Maura, and Niceto Alcalá Zamora, who founded the new party of the Liberal Republican Right).

Throughout 1930 all the symptoms were accumulating which announced that a return to the situation prior to 1923 would not be possible, because the Monarchy was isolated. The social sectors that had always supported it, such as employers and businessmen, began to abandon it because they distrusted its capacity to get out of "that mess". Nor did the Monarchy have the support of the middle class -the influence of the Church in this sector was being reduced and replaced by democratic and socialist ideas-, and intellectuals and university students clearly showed their rejection of the King.

One of the few supporters of the Monarchy was the Catholic Church —which was grateful for having restored its traditional position in society—, but it was on the defensive in the face of the tide of republicanism and democracy that the country was experiencing. The other support was the Army, which had just undergone an experience of power that had opened breaches in its ranks, but in a sector of it loyalty to the King was cracking.

The social and value changes that had taken place in the last thirty years were not at all favorable to the reestablishment of the power system of the Restoration. This, together with the identification between Dictatorship and Monarchy, explains the sudden rise of republicanism in the cities. Thus, in this rapid process of politicization, the popular classes and the urban middle classes came to the conclusion —as the Dictatorship had just demonstrated— that Monarchy was equal to despotism and democracy was equal to Republic. In 1930 "hostility to the Monarchy spread like an unstoppable hurricane through rallies and demonstrations all over Spain"; "people began to take to the streets joyfully, under any pretext, at the slightest opportunity, to cheer the Republic". The Republican cause was also joined by the intellectuals who formed the Agrupación al Servicio de la República (headed by José Ortega y Gasset, Gregorio Marañón and Ramón Pérez de Ayala). On August 17, 1930, the so-called Pact of San Sebastián took place in the meeting promoted by the Republican Alliance in which apparently (since no written minutes were taken) the strategy to put an end to the Monarchy of Alfonso XIII and to proclaim the Second Spanish Republic was agreed upon. The meeting was attended, according to the "unofficial note" made public the following day, by the Republican Alliance, Alejandro Lerroux, of the Radical Republican Party, and Manuel Azaña, of the Republican Action Group; by the Radical-Socialist Party, Marcelino Domingo, Álvaro de Albornoz and Ángel Galarza; for the Liberal Republican Right, Niceto Alcalá-Zamora and Miguel Maura; for Acción Catalana, Manuel Carrasco Formiguera; for Acción Republicana de Cataluña, Macià Mallol Bosch; for Estat Català, Jaume Aiguader; and for the Autonomous Galician Republican Organization, Santiago Casares Quiroga. Also in attendance were Indalecio Prieto, Felipe Sánchez Román, and Eduardo Ortega y Gasset, brother of the philosopher. Gregorio Marañón was unable to attend, but sent an "enthusiastic letter of support".

In October 1930 the two socialist organizations, the PSOE and the UGT, joined the Pact in Madrid, with the purpose of organizing a general strike to be accompanied by a military insurrection that would put "the Monarchy in the archives of History", as stated in the manifesto made public in mid-December 1930. To direct the action a revolutionary committee was formed, made up of Niceto Alcalá-Zamora, Miguel Maura, Alejandro Lerroux, Diego Martínez Barrio, Manuel Azaña, Marcelino Domingo, Álvaro de Albornoz, Santiago Casares Quiroga and Luis Nicolau d'Olwer, for the Republicans, and Indalecio Prieto, Fernando de los Ríos and Francisco Largo Caballero, for the Socialists. The CNT, for its part, continued its reorganization process (although when its ban was lifted it was only allowed to reconstitute itself at the provincial level), and in accordance with its libertarian and "anti-political" ideology it did not participate at all in the republican-socialist conjunction, so it would continue to act in practice as an "anti-system party" of the revolutionary left.

The republican-socialist revolutionary committee, presided over by Alcalá Zamora, which held its meetings in the Ateneo de Madrid, prepared the military insurrection which would be backed up in the streets by a general strike. This recourse to violence and arms to achieve power and change a political regime had been legitimized by the coup d'état that brought about the Dictatorship.

However, the general strike was never declared, and the military declaration failed fundamentally because the captains Fermín Galán and Ángel García Hernández revolted the garrison of Jaca on December 12, three days before the scheduled date. These events are known as the Jaca uprising and the two insurrectionist captains were subjected to a summary court martial and shot. This event extraordinarily mobilized public opinion in memory of these two "martyrs" of the future Republic.

=== Government of Admiral Aznar and the fall of the Monarchy ===
In spite of the failure of the action in favor of the Republic led by the revolutionary committee, whose members, some were arrested and others fled out of the country or went into hiding, General Berenguer felt obliged to reinstate Article 13 of the Constitution of 1876 (which recognized the public freedoms of expression, assembly and association) and to call general elections for March 1, 1931, assembly and association) and to finally call general elections for March 1, 1931 with the aim of constituting a Parliament which, linking with the Courts prior to the last stage [the Dictatorship of Primo de Rivera], would reestablish in its fullness the functioning of the cosovereign forces [the King and the Courts] which are the axis of the Constitution of the Spanish Monarchy. It was not, therefore, neither a Constituent Courts, nor a Courts that could undertake the reform of the Constitution, for which reason the convocation did not find any support, not even among the monarchists of the parties of the time.

On February 13, 1931, King Alfonso XIII put an end to the "dictablanda" of General Berenguer and appointed Admiral Juan Bautista Aznar as the new president, after unsuccessfully trying to get the liberal Santiago Alba and the conservative "constitutionalist" Rafael Sánchez Guerra (who met with the members of the "revolutionary committee" that were in prison to ask them to participate in his cabinet, which they refused to do: "We have nothing to do or say with the Monarchy", Miguel Maura replied). Aznar formed a government of "monarchist concentration" which included old leaders of the liberal and conservative parties, such as the Count of Romanones, Manuel García Prieto, Gabriel Maura Gamazo, son of Antonio Maura, and Gabino Bugallal. The government proposed a new electoral calendar: municipal elections would be held first on April 12, and then elections to the Courts that would have the character of Constituent Courts, so that they could proceed to the revision of the powers of the Powers of the State and the precise delimitation of the area of each one (that is to say, to reduce the prerogatives of the Crown) and to an adequate solution to the problem of Catalonia.

On March 20, in the middle of the electoral campaign, the court martial was held against the "revolutionary committee" which had led the civic-military movement that had failed after the Jaca uprising. The trial became a great demonstration of republican affirmation and the accused were released.

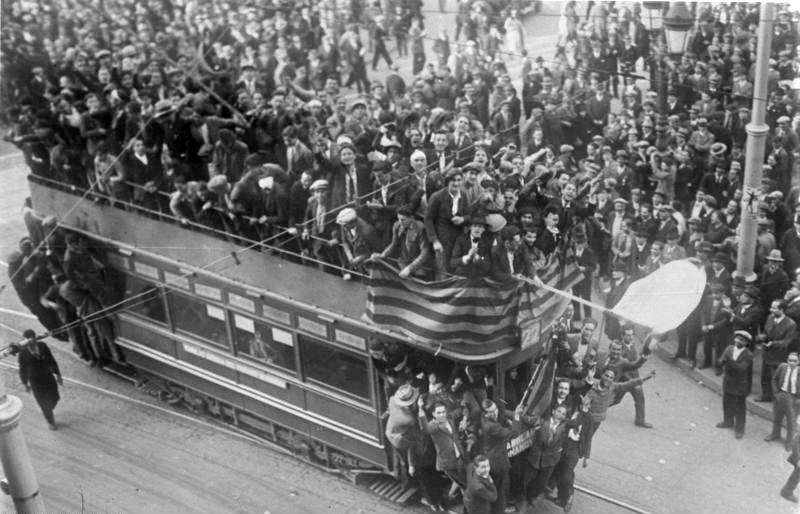
Proclamation of the Second Republic.

Everyone understood the municipal elections of April 12, 1931 as a plebiscite on the Monarchy, so when it was known that the republican-socialist candidacies had won in 41 of the 50 provincial capitals (it was the first time in the history of Spain that a government was defeated in an election, although in the rural areas the monarchists had won because the old caciquismo was still working), the revolutionary committee made public a communiqué affirming that the result of the elections had been "unfavorable to the Monarchy [and] favorable to the Republic" and announced its intention to act with energy and alacrity to give immediate effect to [the] desires [of that Spain, majority, yearning and youthful] by implanting the Republic. On Tuesday, April 14, the Republic was proclaimed from the balconies of the city halls occupied by the new councilors and King Alfonso XIII was forced to leave the country. That same day the revolutionary committee became the First Provisional Government of the Second Spanish Republic.

== Responsibilities ==
One of the first decisions of the Constituent Courts formed after the elections of June 1931 was to appoint a Commission of Responsibilities that would not only resume the work of the one abandoned by Primo de Rivera's coup d'état in September 1923, which had dealt with the Disaster of Annual, but would also deal with the responsibilities contracted by the Dictatorship and by the deposed King Alfonso XIII. Its competences and attributions were discussed between August 13 and 25, and after an intense debate, a law was approved that delimited them. Article 1 stated: "The Constituent Courts confer on its Commission of Responsibilities the mission of investigating as many proceedings as it deems appropriate to purge, and in due course demand, the high political or ministerial management responsibilities that have caused serious material or moral damage to the Nation, specified in the following five categories: a) High responsibility of Morocco. b) Social policy of Catalonia. c) Coup d'Etat of September 13, 1923. d) Management and political responsibilities of the Dictatorships. e) The Jaca Process". Article 8 states: "Once the investigation of each case has been completed, the Commission will submit to the Chamber the proposal of responsibility, indicating in each case the Court that, in the opinion of the Commission, should punish the facts. The House shall freely decide what it deems appropriate in each particular case of those submitted to it by the Commission".

In the early morning of November 20, 1931, the plenary of the Courts approved by acclamation to declare guilty of "high treason" "the former King of Spain", "who, exercising the powers of his magistracy against the Constitution of the State, has committed the most criminal violation of the legal order of his country, and, consequently, the sovereign Court of the Nation solemnly declares D. Alfonso de Borbón y Habsburgo-Lorena out of the Law. Deprived of legal peace, any Spanish citizen will be able to seize his person if he enters national territory. Don Alfonso de Borbón will be stripped of all his dignities, rights and titles, which he will not be able to legally hold either inside or outside Spain, of which the Spanish people, through their representatives elected to vote the new rules of the Spanish State, declares him to be deposed, without him ever being able to claim them either for himself or for his successors. Of all the goods, rights and shares of his property that are in the national territory will be seized for the benefit of the State, which will arrange the convenient use that should be given to them". The president of the government, Manuel Azaña, addressing the deputies, said: "with this vote the second proclamation of the Republic in Spain is carried out".

About a year later, on December 7, 1932, the sentence was published stating that the Constituent Courts condemned the former ministers of the Dictatorship of Primo de Rivera to between twelve and eight years of confinement in Santa Cruz de Tenerife, in Las Palmas or in Mahón, in addition to twenty years of disqualification with the same loss of passive rights. However, none of them served the sentence because they were abroad and on May 2, 1934, the center-right government of Alejandro Lerroux amnestied them, so that from that date they could return to Spain.

== Bibliography ==
- Balcells, Albert (2010). El projecte d'autonomia de la Mancomunitat de Catalunya del 1919 i el seu context históric. Barcelona: Parlament de Catalunya. ISBN 978-84-7283-329-6.
- Barrio, Ángeles (2004). La modernización de España (1917–1939). Política y sociedad (in Spanish). Madrid: Síntesis. ISBN 84-9756-223-2.
- Boyd, Carolyn P. (2003). "El rey-soldado". Alfonso XIII. Un político en el trono (in Spanish) (Javier Moreno Luzón ed.). Madrid: Marcial Pons. ISBN 84-95379-59-7.
- Casanova, Julián (2007). República y Guerra Civil. Vol. 8 de la Historia de España, dirigida por Josep Fontana y Ramón Villares (in Spanish). Barcelona: Crítica/Marcial Pons. ISBN 978-84-8432-878-0.
- Dardé, Carlos (1996). La Restauración, 1875-1902. Alfonso XII y la regencia de María Cristina (in Spanish). Madrid: Historia 16-Temas de Hoy. ISBN 84-7679-317-0.
- De la Cueva Merino, Julio (2003). "El rey católico". Alfonso XIII. Un político en el trono (in Spanish) (Javier Moreno Luzón ed.). Madrid: Marcial Pons. ISBN 84-95379-59-7.
- de Riquer, Borja, ed. (2013). Alfonso XIII y Cambó. La monarquía y el catalanismo político (in Catalan). Barcelona: RBA. ISBN 9788429777345.
- García Queipo de Llano, Genoveva (1997). El reinado de Alfonso XIII. La modernización fallida (in Spanish). Madrid: Historia 16. ISBN 84-7679-318-9.
- González Calleja, Eduardo (2003). "El ex-rey". Alfonso XIII. Un político en el trono (in Spanish) (Javier Moreno Luzón ed.). Madrid: Marcial Pons. pp. 403–435. ISBN 84-95379-59-7.
- González Calleja, Eduardo (2005). La España de Primo de Rivera. La modernización autoritaria 1923-1930 (in Spanish). Madrid: Alianza Editorial. ISBN 84-206-4724-1.
- Juliá, Santos (1999). Un siglo de España. Política y sociedad (in Spanish). Madrid: Marcial Pons. ISBN 84-9537903-1.
- Juliá, Santos (2003). "Los intelectuales y el rey". Alfonso XIII. Un político en el trono (in Spanish) (Javier Moreno Luzón ed.). Marcial Pons. ISBN 84-95379-59-7.
- Lario, Ángeles (1999). El rey, piloto sin brújula. La Corona y el sistema político de la Restauración (in Spanish) (1875-1902). Prologue by Javier Tusell. Madrid, Biblioteca Nueva-UNED, ISBN 84-7030-681-2
- Moreno Luzón, Javier (2009). "Alfonso XIII, 1902-1931". In Josep Fontana; Ramón Villares (eds.). Restauración y Dictadura. Historia de España (in Spanish). Vol. 7. Barcelona: Crítica/Marcial Pons. ISBN 978-8416771080.
- Recio García, María Ángeles (2018). El desastre de Annual en el Parlamento español: las Comisiones de Responsabilidades (PDF). Guerra Colonial. Revista Digital. pp. 61–78. Archived from the original (PDF) on 1 August 2019.
- Suárez Cortina, Manuel (2006). La España Liberal (1868–1917). Política y sociedad (in Spanish). Madrid: Síntesis. ISBN 84-9756-415-4.
- Tusell, Javier (1997). "El reinado de Alfonso XIII (1902-1931)". Historia de España. Vol. IX. La Restauración. De la Regencia a Alfonso XIII (in Spanish) (Feliciano Montero; Javier Tusell ed.). Madrid: Espasa-Calpe. ISBN 84-239-8959-3.
- Tusell, Javier; García Queipo de Llano, Genoveva (2002). Alfonso XIII. El rey polémico (2nd ed.). Madrid: Taurus. ISBN 84-306-0449-9.

Predecessor Reign of Alfonso XII	Periods of Spanish History Reign of Alfonso XIII of Spain	Successor: Second Spanish Republic
