= 1923 Spanish coup d'état =

1923 coup d'état of Primo de Rivera in Spain

- Part of the crisis of the Restoration and the interwar period
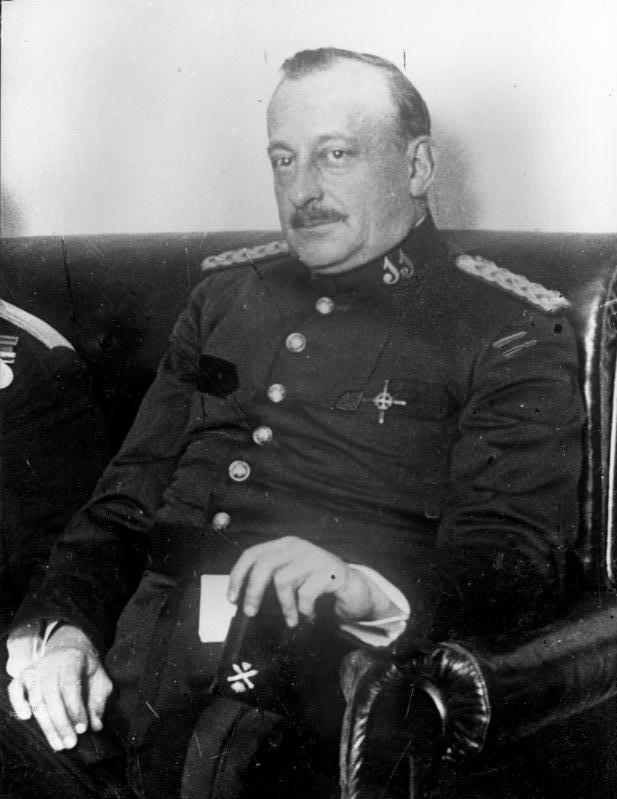
- General Primo de Rivera
- Date: 13–15 September 1923
- Location: Spain, primarily Catalonia
- Also known as: Coup d'état by Primo de Rivera
- Type: Coup d'état
- Motive: Problems in the Rif War; Crisis of the political system; Tensions with the Spanish labor movement; Pistolerismo
- Participants: Miguel Primo de Rivera and most of the Spanish Army, with the acquiescence of King Alfonso XIII
- Outcome: Coup successful: Overthrow of the Restoration system; Miguel Primo de Rivera appointed prime minister of Spain, at the helm of a military directorate; Martial law declared; 1876 Constitution suspended; Dictatorship established

A coup d'état took place in Spain between 13 and 15 September 1923, led by the then-Captain General of Catalonia Miguel Primo de Rivera. It resulted in the overthrow of the Restoration system and the establishment of a dictatorship under Primo de Rivera, mainly because King Alfonso XIII did not oppose the coup and appointed the rebel general as head of the government at the helm a military directorate.

Historian Francisco Alía Miranda has pointed out that "the coup d'état of General Miguel Primo de Rivera [was] atypical for its simplicity. To triumph he only needed the backing of a few prestigious military officers and to publish a manifesto in the press addressed To the country and the Army. The Restoration regime collapsed in a few hours. [...] He did not need more backing from chiefs in command of the troops, for that the shadow of Alfonso XIII was already behind him".

Javier Moreno Luzón pointed out that Alfonso XIII "knew that handing over power to the military entailed a crucial political turnaround. The most important in Spain since the end of 1874, when another coup had facilitated the return of the Bourbon dynasty and the opening of a different stage, the Restoration. To validate that act of force questioned the moderating functions assigned to the monarch by the constitutional texts of 1876... Moreover, now the Government was not taken over by a caudillo at the service of a specific party, but by the army as a corporation. All of which would bring unforeseeable consequences".

According to the Israeli historian Shlomo Ben-Ami, "it is in Catalonia where the immediate origins of Primo de Rivera's coup must be sought. It was there that the bourgeoisie created the hysterical atmosphere that surrounded Primo de Rivera with the halo of "savior" and placed his rebellion, as a contemporary observer noted, in the general context of the anti-Bolshevik reaction that had also reached other European countries. Cambó, authentic representative of the Catalan high bourgeoisie, "the theoretician of the Spanish dictatorship", as Maurín called him, crudely exposed the yearning and responsibility of his class for the dictatorship: [...] "A society in which the demagogic [syndicalist] avalanche puts ideals and interests in grave danger will resign itself to everything as long as it feels protected..." [...] This does not mean, however, that there was a real danger of social revolution on the eve of Primo de Rivera's coup".

== Background ==
=== Political role of the Army ===
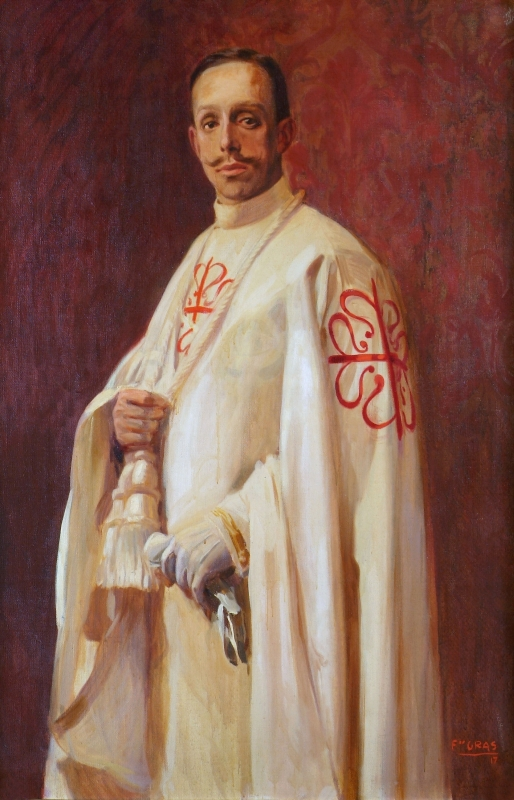
Portrait of Alfonso XIII wearing the habit of the Order of Calatrava (1917).

Since the "disaster of 1898", there was a growing intervention of the Army in Spanish political life, presenting itself as the interpreter of the "popular will" and the defender of the "national interest, above partial interests and partisan politics". Two key moments of this praetorianism were the Cu-Cut! events of 1905 —the assault by officers of the Barcelona garrison on the editorial office and workshops of this Catalan nationalist satirical publication, and also those of the newspaper La Veu de Catalunya, in response to a satirical cartoon about the military— which led to the Law of Jurisdictions of 1906, and, above all, the Spanish crisis of 1917, in which the self-declared Juntas de Defensa, made up exclusively of military personnel, took on a special role.

As José Luis Gómez-Navarro has pointed out, "among Spanish chiefs and officers, since the beginning of the 20th century, but increasingly after the First World War, an anti-parliamentarism and a rejection of politics had spread.... The Spanish army consolidated the defense of values consubstantial to military professionalism but whose weight increased in the face of the crisis: order, hierarchy, discipline and authority; to which was added its growing role as defenders of the foundations of the social order and of the moderating institution that guaranteed the continuity of the social and political system: the monarchy".

=== "Bolshevik triennium" and pistolerismo (1918–1923) ===
In the years following the crisis of 1917, a serious social crisis broke out in Catalonia and in the Andalusian countryside. "An authentic "social war", with anarchist attacks and attacks by gunmen in the pay of employers, was declared in Catalonia and three years of mobilizations of day laborers in the countryside to whom the echoes of the Russian revolution in Andalusia had reached". Although the two great Spanish workers' organizations, CNT and PSOE-UGT did not join the communist movement, the October Revolution "acted in Spain as an unstoppable mobilizing myth that shocked for years the working class, dragged its leaders and dazzled the masses they tried to frame".

In Andalusia between 1918 and 1920 there was an intensification of mobilizations, known as the "Bolshevik triennium". There were constant strikes by day laborers that were responded to with extraordinary harshness by the bosses and the authorities. During the strikes the day laborers occupied the farms, being violently evicted from them by the civil guard and the army. There was also sabotage and attacks.

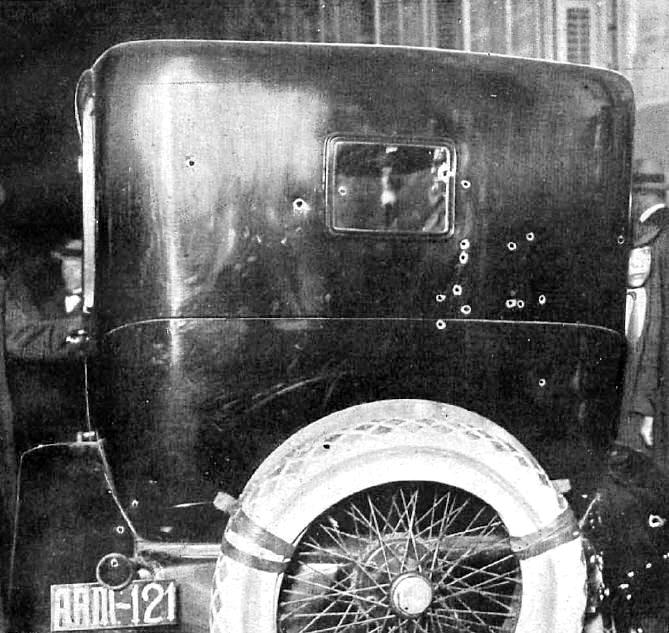
Back of the car in which Eduardo Dato was assassinated, showing the bullet holes.

In Catalonia the conflict began in February 1919 with the strike of the Canadiense, which was the name by which the company Barcelona Traction, Light and Power, that supplied electricity to Barcelona, was known. As a result, the city was left without electricity, water and streetcars. The liberal government of the Count of Romanones opted for the path of negotiation accompanied by the approval of the "eight-hour" decree and a new social insurance system, but had to give in to pressure from the employers, who demanded an iron fist and found valuable support in the Captain General of Catalonia, Joaquín Milans del Bosch, and King Alfonso XIII. Thus it was that the Catalan workers' conflict degenerated into a "social war" whose main stage was Barcelona. The violence of the bosses' pistoleros was answered with terrorist attacks perpetrated by anarchist action groups.

The new government of the conservative Eduardo Dato appointed General Severiano Martínez Anido as civil governor, who greatly increased the harsh repressive policy applied by Milans del Bosch against the CNT. "He implemented a regime of terror that made use of free trade unionism, persecuted the leaders of the CNT and applied the law of escapes: some detainees were executed on the spot by the forces of order, under the pretext that they had tried to flee". Terrorist acts and street violence between anarchists and members of the free and parapolice forces followed one after the other between 1920 and 1923. The spiral of violence reached Dato himself, who was riddled with bullets in Madrid by three anarchists on 8 March 1921. In 1923 Salvador Seguí, a leader of the CNT who had not supported the violent way and who defended the return to the trade union way, and the archbishop of Zaragoza Juan Soldevila were also assassinated.

=== Córdoba speech by Alfonso XIII (1921) ===
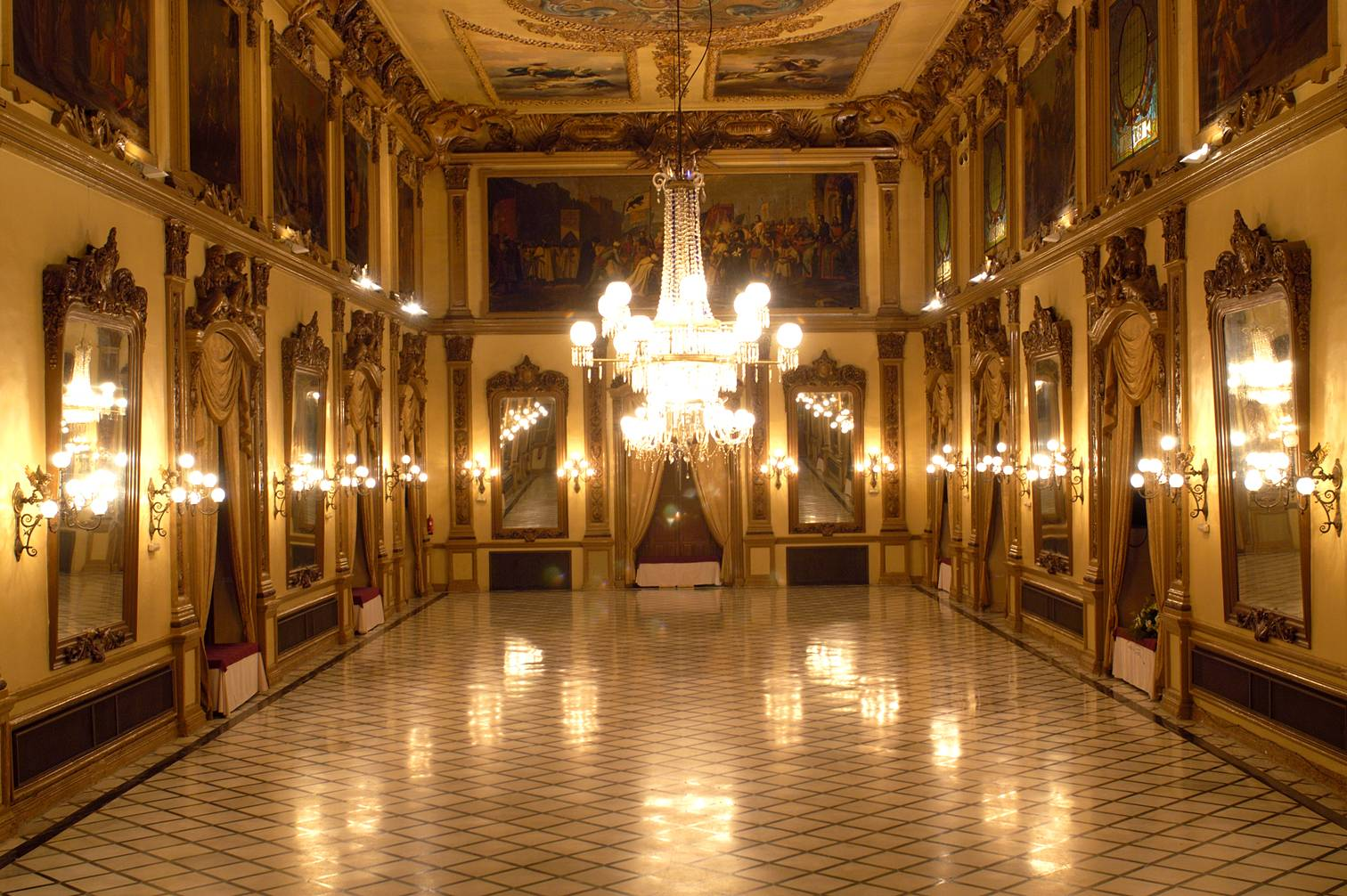
Liceo Hall of the Casino de la Amistad of Cordoba.

The first problem that the new government formed after the assassination of Eduardo Dato, which was presided over by the also conservative Manuel Allendesalazar, had to face was the controversy raised by Alfonso XIII's speech delivered on 23 May 1921 at the Casino de la Amistad in Cordoba before the large landowners of the province and the authorities of the capital. Alfonso XIII was convinced, and he was not the only one at that time in Europe, that the parliamentary system was in decadence and was not strong enough to face the revolutionary forces driven by the "Soviet idea", which led him to a generalized criticism of the liberal institutions in Spain —parties, government and Cortes—, as could be seen in the Cordoba speech.

The king complained about the politicians whose "machinations and pettiness" prevented the approval in the Cortes of the projects that "interest everyone" and so he proposed that "the provinces" begin a "movement of support for your King and the beneficial projects and then the Parliament will remember that it is the people's mandatary, since nothing else means the vote that you give it at the ballot box. Then the King's signature will be a guarantee that the beneficial projects will become a reality." He also said "that he, inside or outside the Constitution, would have to impose himself and sacrifice himself for the good of the Motherland". Alfonso XIII was aware of what he was saying because before launching the proposal he had said: "Some will say that I am stepping out of my constitutional duties but I have been a constitutional King for nineteen years and I have risked my life many times to be caught now in a constitutional fault". The minister who accompanied him, Juan de la Cierva, tried to get the journalists to publish only the "soft summary" he had prepared, but the complete text was broadcast with posters by a film newsreel (it was the first time, and the last time, that a speech by the king was made public in this way). José Luis Gómez-Navarro has pointed out that "what is truly significant in this speech is not only the criticism of the functioning of the Restoration regime in those years but his call to the citizens to meet with their king, without mediation, outside the political parties, in order to be effective and solve the problems that Spain was facing. [Alfonso XIII had made a qualitative leap in his thinking. The crown, represented in his person, became the interpreter of the popular will, at least in crisis situations".

The Congress of Deputies took up the matter four days later. The socialist Julián Besteiro affirmed that the king had had some words of "contempt" towards the Parliament and the also socialist Indalecio Prieto proclaimed shouting up to three times: "The Parliament has more dignity than the King!" (Prieto's phrase did not appear in the Diario de Sesiones but it circulated all over Madrid). On the other hand, the conservative Antonio Maura supported the monarch saying that his words had been applauded by "sensible Spain" and the Catholic newspaper El Debate published that they would be "fervently applauded" by the "people detached from politics". For his part, Alfonso XIII "for the moment, was frightened by the impact of his statements and denied any anti-parliamentary intention", although in private he confessed that he had said what he thought, with which "Don Alfonso was in tune with the critics of parliamentarism, which abounded in Spain -as in all Europe, as well as in Latin America- during those years".

=== Disaster of Annual (1921) ===
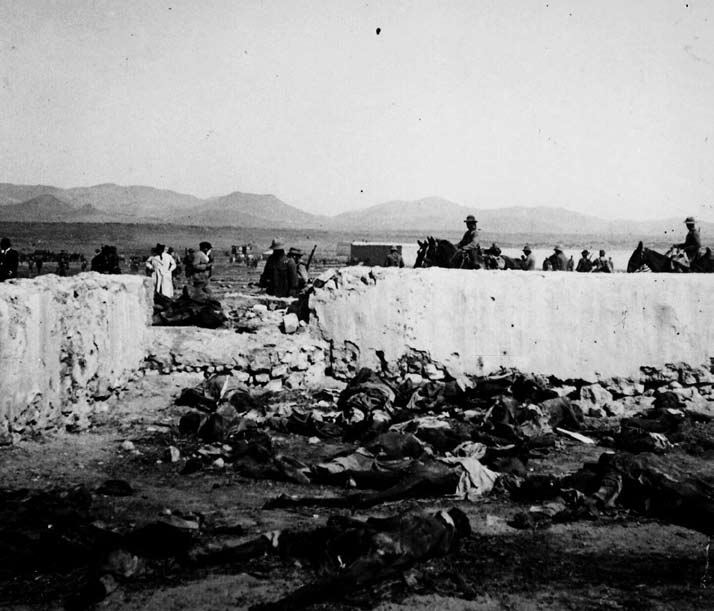
Corpses found in Annual.

The most serious problem that the Allendesalazar government had to face was the crisis caused by the disaster of Annual, which occurred two months later in the Spanish Protectorate of Morocco. "The unexpected offensive of the Indians [led by Abd el-Krim] concluded in a general disbandment of the Spanish Army in the direction of Melilla. The Spanish troops were dispersed in a very extensive front with a very high number of positions and with serious supply problems. The units were poorly equipped.... The collapse of the front resulted in the loss in just a few days of what had been achieved with great difficulty for years. Not only General Silvestre [commander general of Melilla and head of the Spanish forces in the eastern half of the Protectorate] died, but also 10,000 other soldiers".

The "disaster of Annual" shocked public opinion. There were demonstrations and protest strikes demanding responsibility. In the Cortes and in the press they were also demanded and King Alfonso XIII himself was accused of having encouraged Fernandez Silvestre to act as recklessly as he did. The people who stood out most in the accusations against the king were the writer Miguel de Unamuno and the socialist deputy Indalecio Prieto. The latter concluded one of his speeches in the Cortes with a phrase that caused a great scandal in the hemicycle and for which he was prosecuted: "Those fields of dominion are today fields of death: eight thousand corpses seem to gather around the steps of the throne in demand of justice". Prieto also referred to an expression attributed to Alfonso XIII that alluded to the large amount of money the Rifian rebels demanded to free the hundreds of Spanish prisoners still in their power (Prieto was again admonished by the president of the Congress of Deputies): "There are those who attribute this attitude of the Government to a very lofty phrase, according to which goose bumps are expensive". The historian Javier Moreno Luzón adds: "Such real sarcasm, about the value of the prisoners, would not be easily forgotten". For his part, Unamuno referred to an alleged telegram sent by the king to Fernandez Silvestre encouraging him to launch the offensive in which he said: "Olé los hombres!" (or "Olé tus cojones!" or "Olé los hombres, el 25 te espero!", in reference to the feast of Santiago Apostle, patron saint of Spain). The alleged telegram, if it had existed, was never found.

To face the serious political consequences of the "disaster of Annual" —the government of Allendesalazar resigned four days after the fall of Al Aaroui— the king resorted to the conservative Antonio Maura who on 3 August 1921 formed, as in 1918, a "government of concentration", which included both conservatives and liberals, and also again the Catalanist Cambó. The first measure taken by the new government was to open a file —whose instructor would be General Juan Picasso— to settle the military responsibilities of the "Annual disaster". The government also dealt with the Juntas de Defensa and in January 1922 transformed them into "informative commissions" subject to the Ministry of War after overcoming the king's resistance to sign the decree. However, Maura's government, beset by the "question of responsibilities" lasted only eight months and in March 1922 it was replaced by an exclusively conservative government presided over by José Sánchez Guerra.

The new government dissolved the "informative commissions" in November, this time counting on the support of the king who in June had said in a meeting with the military of the Barcelona garrison: "At present it is shocking to note in our army groupings which, although motivated by a perhaps most noble desire, are frankly outside what the most elementary obedience and fundamental discipline advise. The officer cannot get involved in politics". But at the same time in that speech he had made an appeal to the unity of the army around him: "I beg you to always remember that you have no other commitment than the oath taken to your country and to your king". Another civilian measure (of submission of the military to civilian power) was the removal of General Severiano Martínez Anido from his post as civil governor in Barcelona. Alfonso XIII resigned himself to the dismissal and told Sánchez Guerra: "it is necessary to agree that you have some... like the cathedral of Toledo".

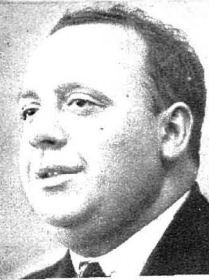
The Socialist deputy Indalecio Prieto was the one who launched the strongest accusations against King Alfonso XIII for his alleged responsibility in the Annual disaster.

After the delivery to the Ministry of War in April 1922 by General Picasso of his report on the "Annual disaster", which was devastating since in it he denounced the fraud and corruption that had taken place in the administration of the protectorate, as well as the lack of preparation and improvisation of the commanders in the conduct of military operations, without sparing the governments that had not provided the Army with the necessary material means ―based on what was related in the Expediente Picasso, the Supreme Council of War and Navy, presided over by General Francisco Aguilera, ordered the prosecution of twenty-six chiefs and officers, together with the high commissioner, General Berenguer, General Fernández Silvestre, if he was alive as his body had not been found, and General Navarro, prisoner of Abd el-Krim―, the government accepted that the Congress of Deputies should address the question of responsibilities, also the political ones, and sent it a copy of the Picasso File ―on 21 July 1922 the Commission of Responsibilities of the Congress was constituted―. Once again it was the socialist deputy Indalecio Prieto who made the strongest intervention, for which he would be prosecuted. He held responsible for what happened to "the parties that have taken turns in this period of the monarchy" for not "having known how to frame everyone, even the king, within their constitutional duties".

=== Last constitutional government under Alfonso XIII ===
The debate on responsibilities brought to light the division among the conservatives —Antonio Maura proposed that the ministers involved should be tried by the Senate— and when the government crisis finally occurred in December 1922 —pressured by the liberals who demanded to return to the power they had not held exclusively since 1919— the king offered the presidency to Manuel García Prieto who formed a new one of "liberal concentration", which was to be the last constitutional government of the reign of Alfonso XIII. This government announced its intention to advance in the process of responsibilities. In July 1923, the Senate granted the supplication to be able to prosecute General Berenguer since he enjoyed parliamentary immunity as a member of that Chamber.

The government of García Prieto also considered a project of reform of the political regime which could lead to the birth of an authentic parliamentary monarchy, although in the elections held at the beginning of 1923 there was again widespread fraud and recourse to the cacique machinery to ensure a majority. However, the non-dynastic parties made progress, especially the PSOE, which obtained a resounding triumph in Madrid where it won seven seats. In the end, however, the government was unable to carry out its plans for reform and accountability because on 13 September 1923, General Miguel Primo de Rivera, Captain General of Catalonia, led a coup d'état in Barcelona that ended the liberal regime of the Restoration. King Alfonso XIII did not oppose the coup. The Cortes had planned to debate the report of the Commission of Responsibilities on the "Disaster of Annual" on 2 October, but the coup prevented it.

== Conspiracy ==
=== Barcelona ===
On 14 March 1922 General Primo de Rivera was appointed by the new government of the conservative José Sánchez Guerra captain general of Catalonia, a decision that was well received by the Catalan bourgeoisie due to the fame that preceded him as a defender of "order". As Primo de Rivera himself later explained, it was during his posting as captain general of Valencia in 1920 that he was "terrified" by the radicalism of the working class ("of a revolutionary communist hue") and became aware of "the need to intervene in Spanish politics by procedures different from the usual ones". At that time Valencia was the second most conflictive Spanish city after Barcelona. "In the capital of the Turia, Primo applied a policy euphemistically called "mano dura" (iron fist). In practice, this meant having no qualms about faking the escape of detainees in order to murder them in cold blood", explained Alejandro Quiroga. In a letter he sent to the president of the government, Eduardo Dato justified his actions outside the law to achieve the "extirpation of terrorism and revolutionary syndicalism", since "ordinary justice and legislation" were "ineffective": "A raid, a transfer, an escape attempt and a few shots will begin to solve the problem".

One of the signs of his "policy of order" in Catalonia was the support he gave to the protests of the employers' organizations because of the decision of the government of José Sánchez Guerra to dismiss in October 1922 the civil governor of Barcelona, General Severiano Martínez Anido, and his deputy, General Arlegui (Superior Chief of Police), who had distinguished themselves for their benevolence towards the bosses' pistolerismo and for the application of brutal measures to try to put an end to the workers' conflicts and the anarcho-syndicalist violence that had been devastating Barcelona and its industrial area since the outbreak of the Canadian Strike of 1919. Primo de Rivera had met with Martínez Anido as soon as he arrived in Barcelona and together with him and Arlegui he had actively participated in the consolidation of "the para-police networks dedicated to the murder of anarchists" and in the promotion of the Free Unions, "this peculiar ultra-right-wing workerism that was subsidized by the Catalan businessmen", according to Alejandro Quiroga. Primo de Rivera declared that the dismissal of Martínez Anido had meant the loss of "a great collaborator".

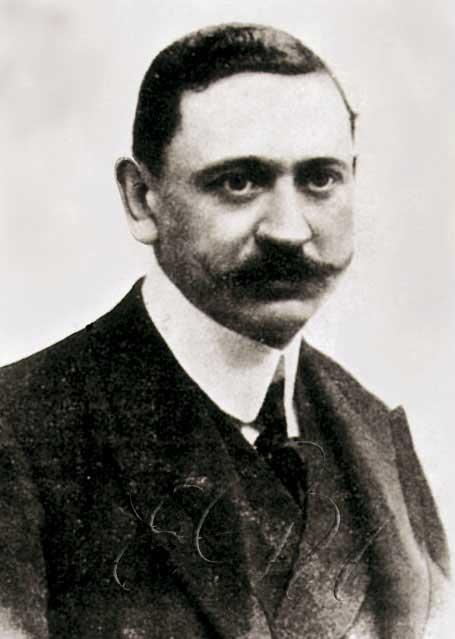
Manuel García Prieto, president of the government since December 1922.

The perception of the Catalan employers' association Fomento del Trabajo Nacional that the dismissal of Martínez Anido and Arlegui had been a mistake was confirmed by the increase in anarchist pistolerismo which took place in the first months of 1923 —from a hundred attacks in 1922 to eight hundred from January to September 1923; and in Barcelona there were 34 dead and 76 wounded, most of them during the transport strike of May–June— and which was accompanied by a revitalization of workers' conflicts. Primo de Rivera was able to respond to these concerns with his defense of "law and order" in the face of the "weakness" of the new government of Manuel García Prieto, which had replaced that of Sánchez Guerra at the beginning of December 1922, which was "denounced" by the conservative press in Barcelona, including La Veu de Catalunya, the organ of Francesc Cambó's Lliga Regionalista.

Primo de Rivera's popularity among the Catalan upper and middle classes reached its zenith on the occasion of his intervention in defense of "law and order" during the general transport strike in Barcelona in May and June 1923, which Primo de Rivera described as "clearly revolutionary". There were murders of businessmen and esquiroles, perpetrated by anarchists, and of cenetistas, victims of the bosses' gunmen. The alignment of the Catalan bourgeoisie with Primo de Rivera against the civil governor Francisco Barber —they had previously achieved the dismissal of the previous civil governor Salvador Raventós— could be seen on 6 June during the funeral of the Somatén subcabo and member of the Libres José Franquesa, murdered a few hours earlier by the anarchists, when Primo was hailed as the savior of Catalonia while the civil governor was insulted and booed as "representative of the Only One". Later, recalling those events, Primo de Rivera wrote:

What to say of the state of mind of all, who alone had placed their trust in me, and urged me to do something, to proceed in whatever way I could, but in such a way as to free Catalonia from the hecatomb that threatened it so evidently?

That June, Primo de Rivera, together with the civil governor of Barcelona, was called to Madrid by the president of the government García Prieto to warn him to stop undermining his policy in Catalonia. Primo de Rivera responded by demanding full powers for the declaration of a state of war to put an end to the transport strike, terrorism and "separatist" demonstrations. "In a gesture intended to be Solomonic, García Prieto thought of dismissing both representatives of state power [the civil governor and Primo de Rivera], but the king refused to sign the decree of dismissal of the captain general [but not that of Governor Barber]. Primo was welcomed in triumph upon his return to Barcelona [on 23 June], and circumvented the Government's refusal to declare a state of war by ordering the closure of Solidaridad Obrera and the arrest of Ángel Pestaña and other moderate cenetista leaders", says Eduardo González Calleja. And in that way he put an end to the transport strike. According to Shlomo Ben-Ami, "the failure of Primo de Rivera's mission in Madrid meant that there was no way, except for its overthrow by force, to remove the constitutional government from its policy of class conciliation in Catalonia".

Together with the "policy of order" —which continued after his return from his trip to Madrid with a very harsh repression of the CNT trade unionists who, for their part, continued with the robberies and the planting of explosives— the other element which sealed Primo de Rivera's alliance with the Catalan bourgeoisie was the promise to protect their industry by raising tariffs on imports, precisely the opposite policy that was being applied by the government of García Prieto, which had negotiated with countries such as Great Britain, France, Germany and the United States to lower the tariffs that their products had to pay when they entered the Spanish market, with the aim of reducing domestic prices and favoring exports, especially agricultural exports. This policy had raised bitter protests from the Chamber of Commerce and Industry of Catalonia. Shortly after the coup, Primo de Rivera declared that the tariff reductions agreed by the García Prieto government had constituted a "criminal" decision.

=== Madrid ===
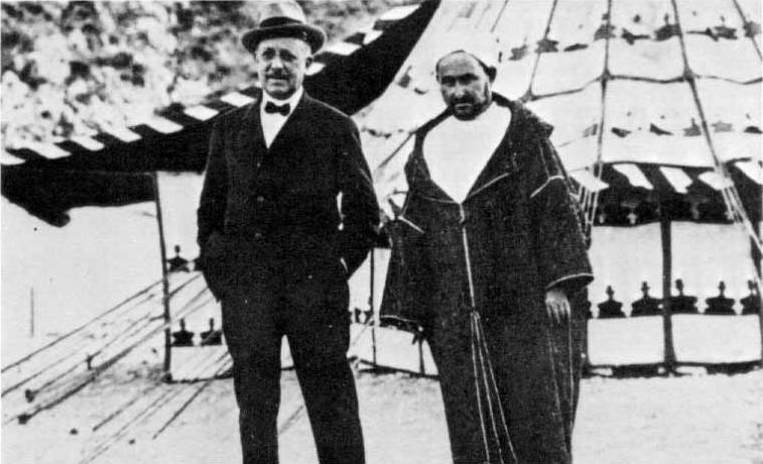
Abd el-Krim, the leader of the Rifian rebels, together with the Spanish businessman Horacio Echevarrieta, sent by the Spanish government to negotiate the release of the Spanish military prisoners after the Annual disaster.

At the beginning of 1923, the indignation of a large part of the Army towards the government of the liberal Manuel García Prieto was evident due to his "claudicating" policy in the Spanish Protectorate of Morocco. Criticism increased on 27 January when the Minister of State Santiago Alba announced that negotiations with Abd el-Krim for the release of the officers and soldiers who had been taken prisoner by the Rifian rebels in the Annual disaster had been successfully completed. 326 soldiers —or 357, according to other sources—, who had been living in inhuman conditions for more than eighteen months, were to be released in exchange for the payment of four million pesetas, a significant amount of money for the time. From that moment on, Santiago Alba became the bête noire of a large part of the army.

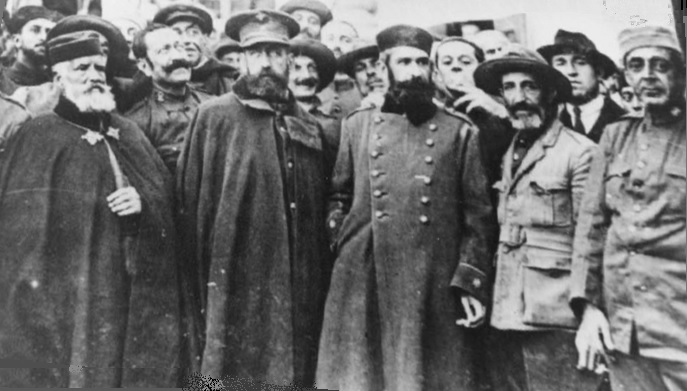
Spanish chiefs and officers were released after the negotiations between the government and Abd el-Krim, which a sector of the Spanish army described as "unworthy".

According to Julio Gil Pecharromán, "the release of the prisoners in exchange for money [was] received by many military men as a slap in the face, a proof of the liberal government's distrust of the operational capacity of the Armed Forces, especially when the left-wing press presented it as a sign of the failure of the "militarism and bureaucracy" that prevailed in the African Army". A manifesto began to circulate in the flag rooms calling for sanctions for those who violated the honor of the Army. On 6 February, the captain general of Madrid, after holding a meeting with the generals and chiefs of the garrison, went to the Minister of War, Niceto Alcalá-Zamora, to tell him that the Army was "depressed and humiliated by the tendentious campaigns that questioned [its] honor", although he told him that in spite of everything it would remain faithful to "the constituted Powers". That same day the captain general of Catalonia, Miguel Primo de Rivera, gathered the generals of his demarcation and sent a long telegram to the minister in which he asked for punitive actions against the Rifians. For his part, the general commander of Melilla communicated to the minister that the chiefs and officers under his command, "with their souls embittered by the unjust attacks they had suffered, were contemplating the most reckless and perhaps illegal undertakings", if he did not take "energetic and immediate action, silencing the anti-Spanish and anti-patriotic press" and launching an operation against Al Hoceima. The government also received news that King Alfonso XIII sympathized with these protests. The response of Minister Alcala Zamora was to remind the military that the policy on Morocco was determined by the government, in a telegram sent to the captains general in which he ordered them to stop "any collective tendency or external acts that would cause serious damage to the interests of the country and the Army, which are identical and nothing can put them in conflict".

In this atmosphere, a conspiratorial nucleus formed by four generals emerged in Madrid, for which it received the name of the Quadrilateral. They were the generals José Cavalcanti, Federico Berenguer, Leopoldo Saro Marín and Antonio Dabán Vallejo. Their objective was to change government policy in Morocco by forming a civilian or military government which, with the support of the king, would appoint an "energetic" general to head the Protectorate. But they did not find much support among their comrades-in-arms who, although hostile to the government, were not willing to engage in a conspiracy to overthrow it.

According to Javier Moreno Luzón, around the same time, King Alfonso XIII "caressed the possibility of assuming all the power himself". The plan, which the king explained to several politicians, including the head of Government García Prieto, "consisted of waiting until 11 May, when the Prince of Asturias would turn sixteen —the age for reigning as stipulated in the Constitution— and then calling a plebiscite that would give him special powers to govern without intermediaries. If that option was rejected by the Spaniards, he could abdicate to his son and preserve the throne". But the "plan" would never be carried out, although in June he commented to one of the ministers that he envisioned a military Cabinet, "free of the obstacles that for certain actions weigh on constitutional and parliamentary governments", and two months later to a British diplomat that "he knew how to stage a coup (strike a blow) that would not only surprise the socialists and revolutionaries, but also many other parties".

For their part, the generals of the Quadrilateral, not finding the support they expected, thought then that the only solution left to them was to convince a general of prestige in the Army to head the movement and the king to appoint him president of the government. The oldest and highest ranking general at the time was Valeriano Weyler, eighty-five years old, but the conspirators did not dare to sound him out because of his age and his known independence. The next in line was General Francisco Aguilera y Egea, president of the Supreme Council of War and Navy and senator for life, whom the Quadrilateral contacted, despite the fact that he had shown himself in favor of investigating the responsibilities of the generals and military chiefs for the Annual disaster. On 5 June, the Captain General of Catalonia Miguel Primo de Rivera wrote him a letter in which he put himself at his disposal in "a saving and bloodless revolution" in order to "save Spain from anarchy, from the shamelessness of Africa and from separatism itself".

But Aguilera was ruled out after being slapped on 5 July in the Senate president's office by former Prime Minister José Sánchez Guerra, after he accused his party colleague, fellow conservative Joaquín Sánchez de Toca, of having lied about an alleged delay in the delivery of documentation about Dámaso Berenguer in order to request to the Senate to prosecute him —and having considered Sánchez de Toca's conduct of "wickedness very much in harmony with his depraved morals", typical of "men of his ilk"—. Because of this resounding slap in the face, Sánchez Guerra was "transformed from then until the end of the Dictatorship into the symbol of the dignity of civilian power", says González Calleja.

"Aguilera's discredit was immediate. The military, who trusted him to bring the politicians to heel, did not accept that he would allow himself to be slapped with impunity by them. Sanchez Guerra added the final blow, accusing Aguilera of being a coup leader, until the general, cornered, publicly disavowed any plan of military intervention in politics. The Quadrilateral was once again without a candidate...", says historian Gabriel Cardona. Historian Javier Tusell writes: "The event, almost like an operetta, left Aguilera in evidence and demonstrated his radical lack of ability, as he dedicated himself to verbally attacking politicians, without looking for supporters in the barracks, which was where he would have to forge a coup d'état". Francisco Alía Miranda agrees with Tusell: "Aguilera fell in disgrace as a result of his poor oratory skills, his political clumsiness and his rough and coarse character". Historian Shlomo Ben-Ami adds another factor for Aguilera to be discarded: "The cold relationship that was said to exist between the king and Aguilera did not exactly consolidate the general's position as a potential leader of the future coup". Apparently the king went so far as to congratulate Sánchez Guerra on the incident. "You have just rendered me the greatest service of your life," he told him.

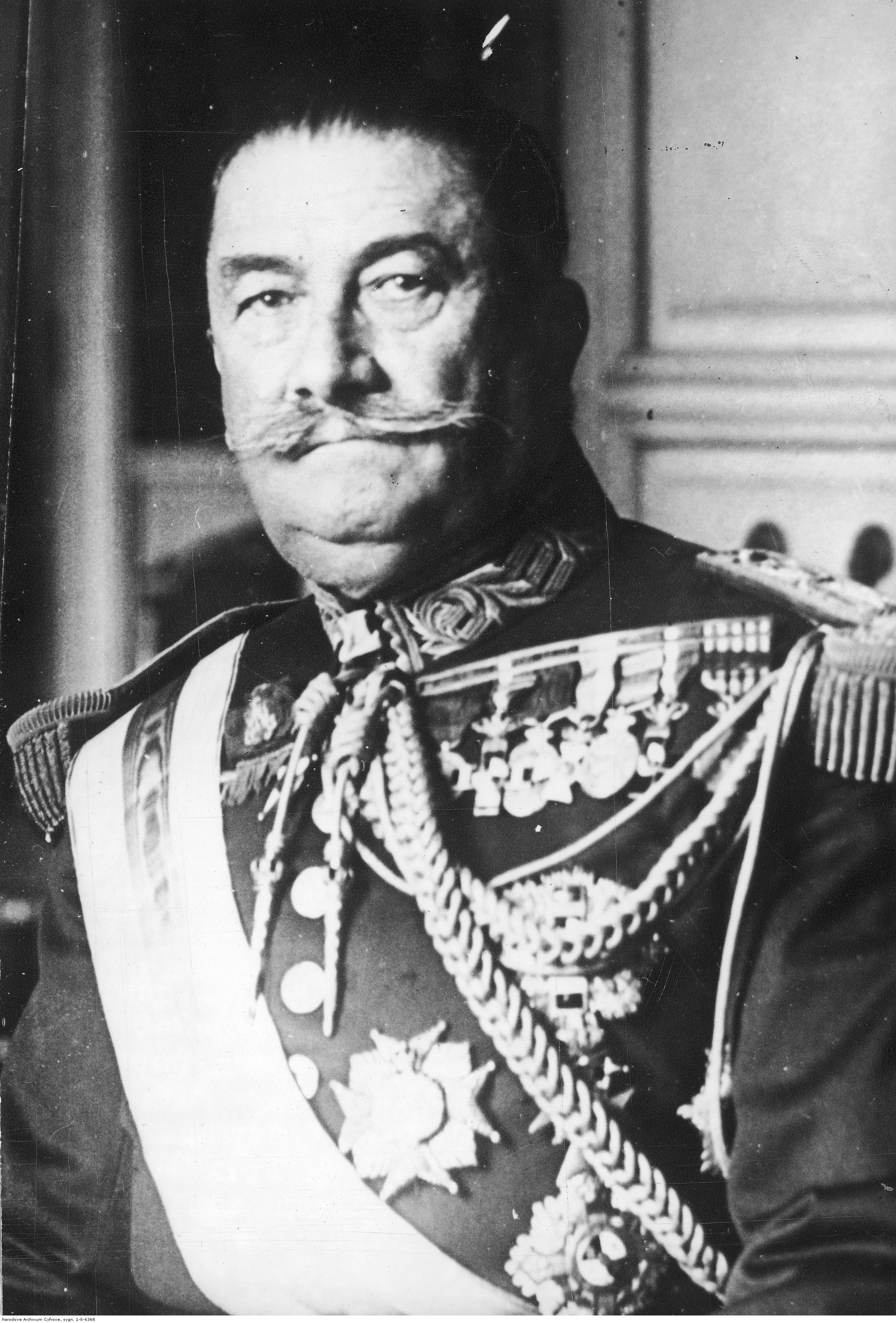
General Dámaso Berenguer, one of the military men indicted in the Picasso file for the Annual disaster, and whose brother, also General Federico Berenguer, was part of the Quadrilateral that led the conspiracy in Madrid.

But the Quadrilateral soon found Aguilera's replacement: General Primo de Rivera, who at that time was in Madrid called by the Government to take him away from Catalonia where he was acquiring an "intolerable tutelage" over the civilians. In the capital Primo de Rivera wrote a text criticizing the government, but he did not use it because, according to historian Javier Tusell, "this would have broken a tradition that had been maintained throughout the Restoration: the Army always put pressure on certain matters, but did not assume direct political control". During his stay in Madrid, Primo de Rivera came into personal contact with General Aguilera —with whom he had maintained a "tense epistolary relationship" since the end of May— but their relationship did not progress because the latter reproached Primo de Rivera for his identification with the bosses in the Catalan labor conflicts. He also met with the king, to whom he expressed his concern about the political situation in the country (there was even speculation about his appointment as head of Alfonso XIII's Military Household). Of much greater importance was the interview he had with the generals of the Quadrilateral, who saw in Primo de Rivera the substitute for the discredited General Aguilera to lead the "coup de force" they advocated, and of which they would give "an account to His Majesty". However, the prosecution in early July of General Cavalcanti for his actions in Morocco was a serious setback for the plans of the conspirators, as well as the appointment of Manuel Portela Valladares as the new civil governor of Barcelona, who reestablished the authority of the civil power in the Catalan capital.

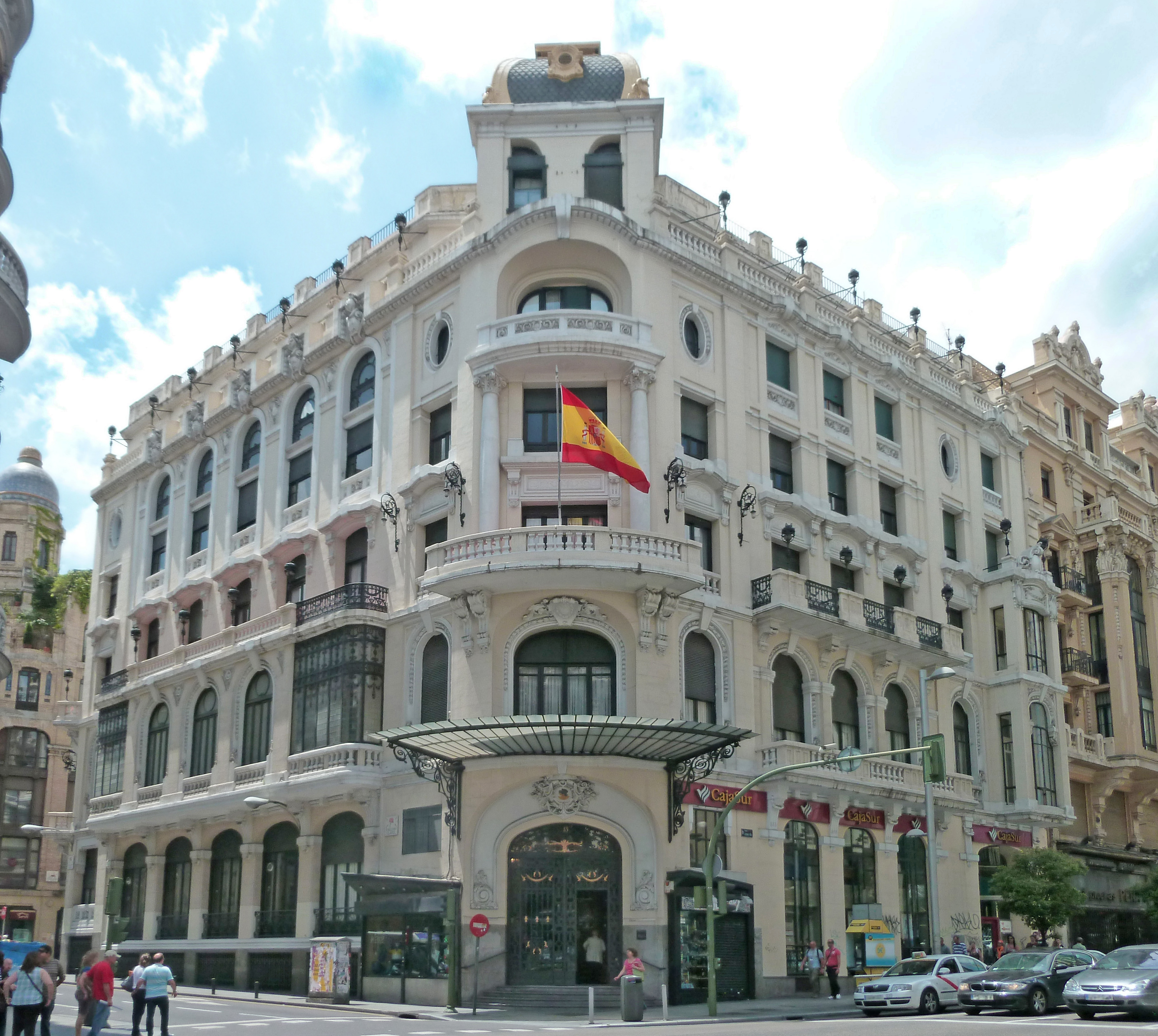
Military Casino of Madrid.

The fact that the chosen one was Primo de Rivera is paradoxical, as Shlomo Ben-Ami has pointed out, because Primo de Rivera had repeatedly expressed an "abandonista" position with respect to Morocco. Primo de Rivera resolved the paradox, according to Ben-Ami, thanks to "his ability to pour water on the wine of his abandonist position, once he decided to conspire, just as he did with his centralist spirit, when he sealed his alliance with Catalan autonomism... On the question of responsibilities, however, he did not need to pretend. He was as determined as the others to put an end to the vindictive campaign against his comrades-in-arms, the members of what he himself used to call the caste".

The signs of the "restlessness" of the "military family" continued. At the beginning of August, a group of generals, including Primo de Rivera, met at the Casino Militar in Madrid, to protest against the inactivity of the government in the Protectorate of Morocco and to support the offensive plan of General Severiano Martínez Anido, then commander general of Melilla. Those gathered warned the government that "the army would no longer tolerate being a toy in the hands of opportunistic politicians". "If some Africanists, among them the men of the Quadrilateral, had harbored some reservations about Primo as leader of the uprising because of his past abandonment [of the Moroccan Protectorate], the "conversion" of the Marquis of Estella to colonial interventionism in August 1923 finally dispelled the doubts," Alejandro Quiroga pointed out.

=== Two weeks prior to the coup ===
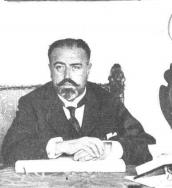
Santiago Alba Bonifaz, Minister of State in the government of Manuel García Prieto, in 1922.

An event at the end of August rekindled the coup plot and convinced Primo de Rivera that the time had come to act. Serious incidents occurred in Malaga when the troops refused to embark for the protectorate of Morocco. The man responsible for the mutiny, Corporal Barroso, was prosecuted but the government pardoned him, which was interpreted by many military men as a proof of the doubts the government had about the future of Morocco, and for which it made the Minister of State Santiago Alba the most responsible.

According to historian Shlomo Ben-Ami, "Primo de Rivera would later say that his patriotic decision [to take power] was stimulated by the Malaga mutiny. "Barroso's acquittal made me understand the dimensions of the horrible abyss into which Spain had been thrown". The military did not see in the Malaga mutiny a simple act of insubordination, but a reflection of the collapse of the law as a deterrent and of a general atmosphere of "defeatism", cultivated by "unpatriotic separatists, communists and unionists". Thus, while the military courts were to punish the mutineers, "military justice" was also to act "against the others", i.e., the unpatriotic civilians. It was up to the army to educate the civilian community and imbue it with a "Spanish" system of values. [...] To further exasperate the military, fearful that the mutineers would "infect" other Army units, the newspaper ABC —whose hysterical campaign against the disintegration of the State helped to create the appropriate climate for the coup— published a photograph of Barroso fraternizing with two officers". Primo de Rivera "decided then to accelerate the conspiratorial activities".

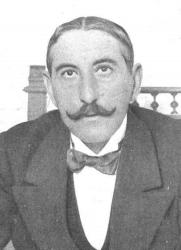
Rafael Gasset, Minister of Public Works resigned at the beginning of September 1923 because he disagreed with the "reactivation" of the policy on the Spanish Protectorate of Morocco, being replaced by Manuel Portela Valladares.

Between 4 and 9 September Primo de Rivera traveled to Madrid, where on the 7th he met again with the generals of the Quadrilateral, who recognized him as the head of the conspiracy —according to González Calleja, "General Saro informed the king that the Army was about to put an end to the existing state of affairs", and Don Alfonso left Madrid "cautiously on his way to his summer residence in San Sebastián"—. According to Javier Moreno Luzón, General Cavalcanti had communicated to the King at the end of August or at the beginning of September that "a military coup was necessary and a dictatorship was needed to prevent a catastrophe in Spain". Alfonso XIII only asked him to keep him informed.

During Primo de Rivera's stay in the capital, it became known that the Central General Staff of the Army, in accordance with the plan designed by Martínez Anido, had recommended to the government a landing in Al Hoceima, in the center of the Protectorate, to put an end to Abd-el-Krim's rebellion, which caused the resignation of three ministers who were opposed to the proposal. One of the politicians who replaced them was Manuel Portela Valladares, the civil governor of Barcelona, which would be a serious mistake, since Portela's transfer to Madrid facilitated the operations prior to the coup that was to have its epicenter in the Catalan capital. For their part, the military circles this time praised the government for "removing the obstacles" to the military plans and the newspaper El Ejército Español, which until then had not ceased to harass the government, welcomed the resignation of the ministers Miguel Villanueva, Joaquín Chapaprieta and Rafael Gasset Chinchilla, as a victory for "the higher interests of the country". The conservative newspaper ABC assessed the government crisis as a "depressing spectacle" which reflected the "political disorientation" characteristic of the system.

On his return from his trip to Madrid, which Shlomo Ben-Ami dates 7 September, Primo de Rivera stopped in Zaragoza where he met with the military governor, General Sanjurjo, to finalize the details of the coup, to which Sanjurjo had already committed himself in a previous visit. As soon as he arrived in Barcelona he got the support of the generals with command in Catalonia, such as Barrera, López Ochoa and Mercader. However, outside his captaincy general, with the exception of Sanjurjo in Zaragoza and the generals of the Quadrilateral in Madrid, he did not get any other general to commit himself to the coup, although many agreed with the idea of establishing a military regime. On the other hand, Primo de Rivera informed the Spanish ambassadors in the main European capitals of his intentions. He also met with prominent members of the Catalan high bourgeoisie and with the president of the Commonwealth of Catalonia Josep Puig i Cadafalch to inform them of his insurrectionary plans.

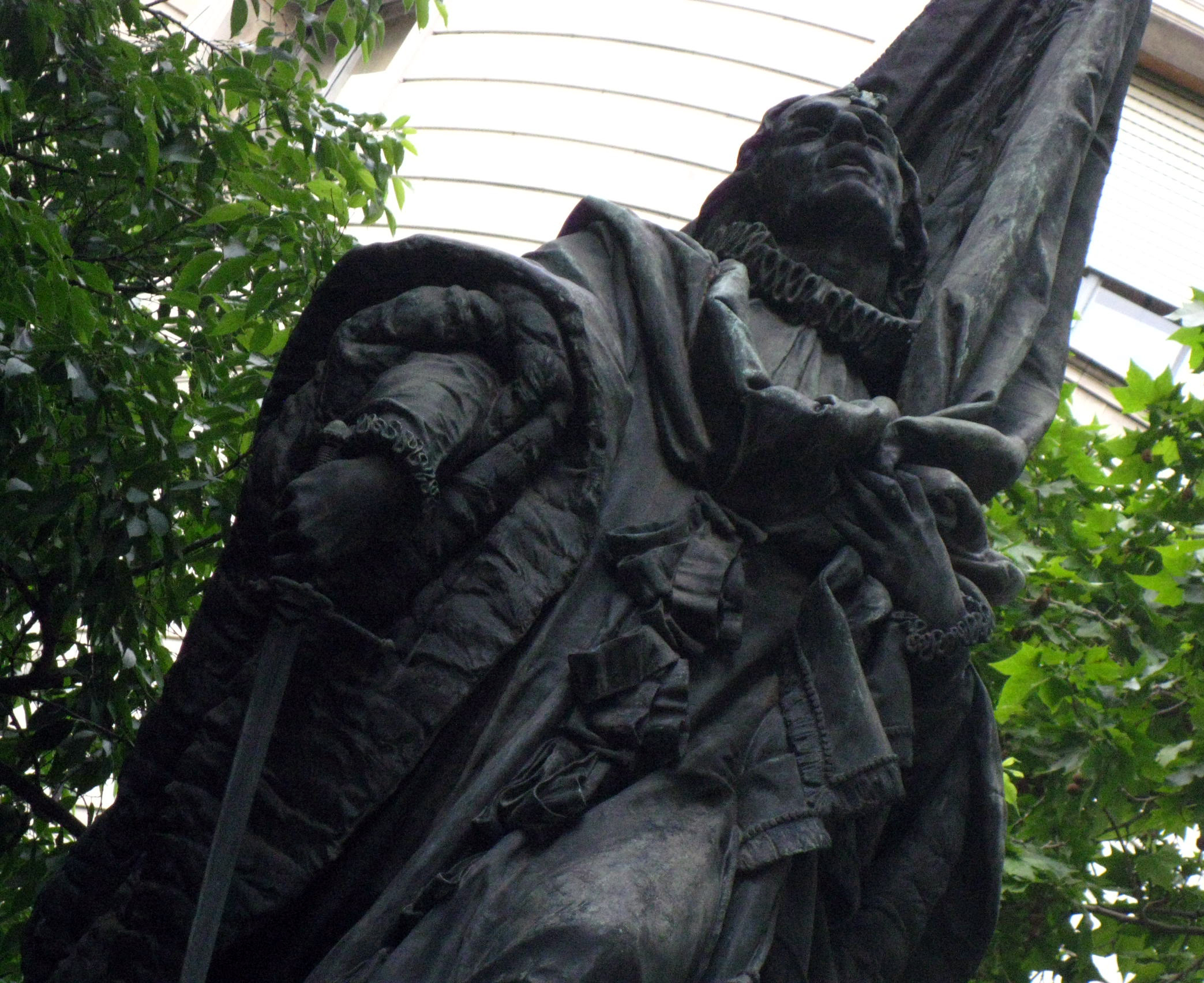
Statue of Rafael Casanova, located in the Ronda de San Pedro in Barcelona, around which the incidents of 11 September 1923 took place.

=== 11 September ===
Apparently the event that precipitated the coup, originally planned for 15 September, were the incidents that took place in Barcelona during the commemoration of the Eleventh of September, provoked by radical Catalan nationalist youths who booed the Spanish flag and shouted "Death to Spain!" and "Long live the Rif Republic!", in support of the uprising of Abd el-Krim, in addition to uttering "Death to the oppressor State!" and "Death to the army!". Thirty people were injured and twenty-four Catalan nationalists were arrested. A member of parliament of the Lliga Regionalista went to the Police Delegation to inquire about the detainees but they did not let him in despite showing his credentials as a member of parliament. He telegraphed the President of the Government García Prieto to denounce the facts and the latter replied that the "subversive shouts" and the "attacks on the public force" were not "rights of citizenship, but crimes".

Immediately, Primo communicated by letter to his fellow conspirators in Madrid the decision to revolt. "Prim and O'Donnell, when they had a company, were already in the street," he wrote to them. He also sent a note to the rest of the captains general in which he implicitly informed them that he was going to carry out a coup d'état in the next few hours and he also contacted by letter General Martínez Anido, who was in San Sebastián with the king. In the letter he told him: "I believe that never will a movement be more pure, gallant, national and organized. From all sides there will be civilian adherents and no military corps will fight us. There will be lukewarm and cuckoos, but for that we give our support as we always gave it to the bullets. A hug and LONG LIVE SPAIN!". Thus, the movement "was brought forward two days to take advantage of the wave of indignation raised among the officialdom by the street incidents that took place in Barcelona during the Diada of 11 September", states Gonzalez Calleja.

=== 12 September ===
On 12 September, preparations accelerated. In Zaragoza, the arrival of Major José Cruz-Conde Fustegueras, liaison of the conspirators with the military governor, General Sanjurjo, led to the finalization of the insurrectionary plans, in the face of the passivity of the captain general. In Madrid, the generals of the Quadrilateral obtained the support of the military governor, General Juan O'Donnell, Duke of Tetuan, but not that of Captain General Diego Muñoz-Cobo, although he did not come out in defense of the government. These preparations were known by the government of García Prieto, who, instead of immediately dismissing the conspirators —the Minister of War, General Luis Aizpuru, opposed this decision because it would increase the "excitement of the Army" and "precipitate events"—, decided to send Minister Portela Valladares to Barcelona, with the excuse that he was going to represent the Executive at the International Furniture Exhibition, and that Aizpuru would send a telegram to "Miguel" to try to dissuade him from his insurrectionary plans. Primo de Rivera did not respond. According to Ben-Ami, "Aizpuru, a close friend of the rebel general, made no energetic effort to prevent the general's activities. Moreover, he seemed to have deliberately provided the coup plotters with arguments against the government by recommending the amnesty of Corporal Barroso, who led the mutiny of soldiers in Malaga against the Moroccan campaign". "Knowing that the Government knew of the coup plans and that it was sending Portela Valladares to try to stop the insurrection..., Primo had no choice but to bring forward the pronunciamiento to that same night of the 12th".

Around four o'clock in the afternoon Primo de Rivera received the agreement of the Quadrilateral by means of a telegram in which reference was also made to the statement made by the Captain General of Madrid that he would not oppose the coup: "Interview held, very well. Doctor knew all the details of the disease and had consulted Dr. Luis. It is convenient to advance the operation". Primo de Rivera replied: "After the birth I resolve to operate her this very night". He also telegraphed to Martínez Anido in San Sebastián: "Anticipated operation 24 hours will be done today, surely a very spirited patient". He also telegraphed to all the captains general:

Discover it, your Excellency, by yourself. In accordance with the manifest that will be in your possession at this hour and in that of the generals and first chiefs under your orders at 12 o'clock tonight, I am addressing the garrison of Madrid in agreement with that of Barcelona to dismiss the government that is exercising its functions with such notorious damage to the motherland and so much disrepute. At four o'clock in the morning I declare a state of war in the region. I hope your Excellency will resolutely second the action and will carry out the orders I receive from the Directory. I salute you for Spain, The King and the Army.

At 9:30 p.m. Primo de Rivera summoned the generals and chiefs committed to the coup to his office in the Captaincy to give them the final instructions (there were six generals, among them the military governor César Aguado Guerra, his chief of staff Juan Gil y Gil, the commander of the Somatén, Plácido Foreira Morante, and General Eduardo López Ochoa; eleven colonels and a lieutenant colonel). They were to get in front of their troops at two o'clock in the morning. And he handed them a proclamation to be read by the officers to the NCOs and sergeants calling for discipline and justifying the uprising:

[...] We want you to know where we are all going in this noble and patriotic adventure: we are going to save the Motherland and the King from corruption and political immorality and then to set Spain on a new course.

== Coup d'état ==
=== 13 September: Initial uprising ===
The Manifesto of Primo de Rivera

TO THE COUNTRY AND THE ARMY.

Spaniards: The moment has arrived for us, more feared than expected (because we would have always wanted to live in legality and for it to govern Spanish life without interruption) to gather the anxieties, to attend to the clamorous request of those who, loving the Motherland, see for it no other salvation than to free it from the professionals of politics, from the men who for one reason or another offer us the picture of misfortunes and immoralities that began in 98 and threaten Spain with a forthcoming tragic and dishonorable end. The dense net of the politics of concupiscence has caught in its meshes, kidnapping it, even the real will. They often seem to ask that those govern who they say they do not allow to govern, alluding to those who have been their only, although weak, brake, and have taken to the laws and customs the little healthy ethics, the tenuous tinge of morality and fairness that they still have; but in reality they easily and happily agree to the turn and to the distribution and among themselves they designate the succession.

Well, now we are going to take all the responsibilities and to govern ourselves or civilian men who represent our morals and doctrine. Enough of meek rebellions, which, without remedying anything, damage so much and more the discipline that is strong and virile to which we throw ourselves for Spain and for the King.

This movement is for men: he who does not feel his masculinity fully characterized, let him wait in a corner, without disturbing the good days that we are preparing for the motherland. Spaniards! Long live Spain and long live the King!

We do not have to justify our act, which the healthy people demand and impose. Assassinations of prelates, ex-governors, agents of authority, employers, foremen and workers; audacious and unpunished robberies; depreciation of the currency; racket of millions of reserved expenses; suspicious tariff policy because of the tendency, and even more because those who manage it flaunt their brazen immorality; creeping political intrigues taking as a pretext the tragedy of Morocco; uncertainties before this very serious national problem; social indiscipline, which makes work inefficient and null, precarious and ruinous the agricultural and industrial production. Unpunished communist propaganda; impiety and unculture; justice influenced by politics; shameless separatist propaganda; tendentious passions around the problem of responsibilities, and... finally, let us be fair, a single point in favor of the Government from whose sap has been living for nine months, due to the inexhaustible goodness of the Spanish people, a weak and incomplete persecution of the vice of gambling.

We do not come to mourn pity and shame, but to put them soon and radically remedy, for which we require the assistance of all good citizens. To this end, and by virtue of the trust and mandate that you have placed in me, a provisional military inspectorate will be set up in Madrid, charged with maintaining public order and ensuring the normal functioning of the ministries and official bodies, requesting the country to offer us in a short time upright, wise and industrious men who can form a Ministry under our protection, but in full dignity and power, to offer them to the King in case he deigns to accept them.[...].

13 September 1923

At midnight of 12 to 13 September 1923, the Captain General of Catalonia Miguel Primo de Rivera proclaimed a state of war in Barcelona and from two o'clock in the morning the troops occupied the key buildings of the city without encountering any opposition. The same happened in the rest of the Catalan capitals. At that time Primo called the Colonel of the Civil Guard and the Chief of Police of Barcelona to the Captaincy and handed them the proclamation declaring a state of war in the region. Also at two o'clock in the morning he gathered four journalists from Barcelona newspapers at the Captaincy and gave them his Manifesto to the Country and the Army (so that they would publish it without adding any commentary), in which he justified the rebellion he had just led and in which he announced the formation of a Militar Inspectorate Directory that would take power with the King's approval.

According to Francisco Alía Miranda, the content of the Manifesto to the Country and the Army "was very simple". Primo de Rivera was aware of its illegality, but justified it in order to meet "the clamorous demand of those who, loving the motherland, see no other salvation for it than to free it from the professionals of politics". Most of the manifesto was dedicated to blaming the "old regime" for the wide "picture of misfortunes and immoralities that began in 1898". Primo de Rivera "presented himself as the iron surgeon who was going to put an end to the evils and dangers of the country with an iron fist and regenerationist measures. But the manifesto hardly mentioned any of them". The manifesto also referred to the "tendentious passions surrounding the problem of responsibilities" (for the "disaster of Annual"). "The last part, the dispositive part, did not announce government proposals.... Only immediate orders were given, to direct the military coup".

In the manifesto, which Javier Moreno Luzón describes as "a regenerationist and patriotic diatribe, filled with barracks masculinity", the classic rhetoric of the pronunciamientos was reflected but, according to Ben-Ami, Primo de Rivera's uprising was not exactly a pronunciamiento, since he intended to govern without the parties (he claimed that he was going to save the country from the hands of "the professionals of politics") and "establish a new regime" and a new type of parliament "truly representative of the national will". According to Roberto Villa García, "Primo de Rivera cut his ties with the constitutional regime without having defined its course and destiny".

Meanwhile, the President of the Government Manuel García Prieto had telephoned twice to King Alfonso XIII, who was in San Sebastián where he had extended his usual summer stay, and the monarch told him that he was exaggerating and that he should contact Primo de Rivera so that he would withdraw his attitude, but that he should not cease. Following the king's instructions, General Luis Aizpuru, Minister of War, had a long telegraphic conversation with Primo de Rivera, but at a certain moment he cut off the communication, thus openly declaring himself in rebellion. Aizpuru tried to get Primo to back down but he claimed that he was determined to "get Spain out of its abjection, ruin and anarchy". He added that he was ready to put up any resistance to the measures approved by the government to put an end to the rebellion. To the journalists he had said: "We have no intention of shooting, but if the courts sentence to this penalty it will be executed, do not doubt it, and if someone rebels against our regime he will pay for it soon and dearly, it is a natural consequence of our love for it, which will make us defend it by all means". Shortly afterwards he sent a telegram to General Cavalcanti in Madrid announcing that the movement was underway, with the phrase: "Maria is in labor".

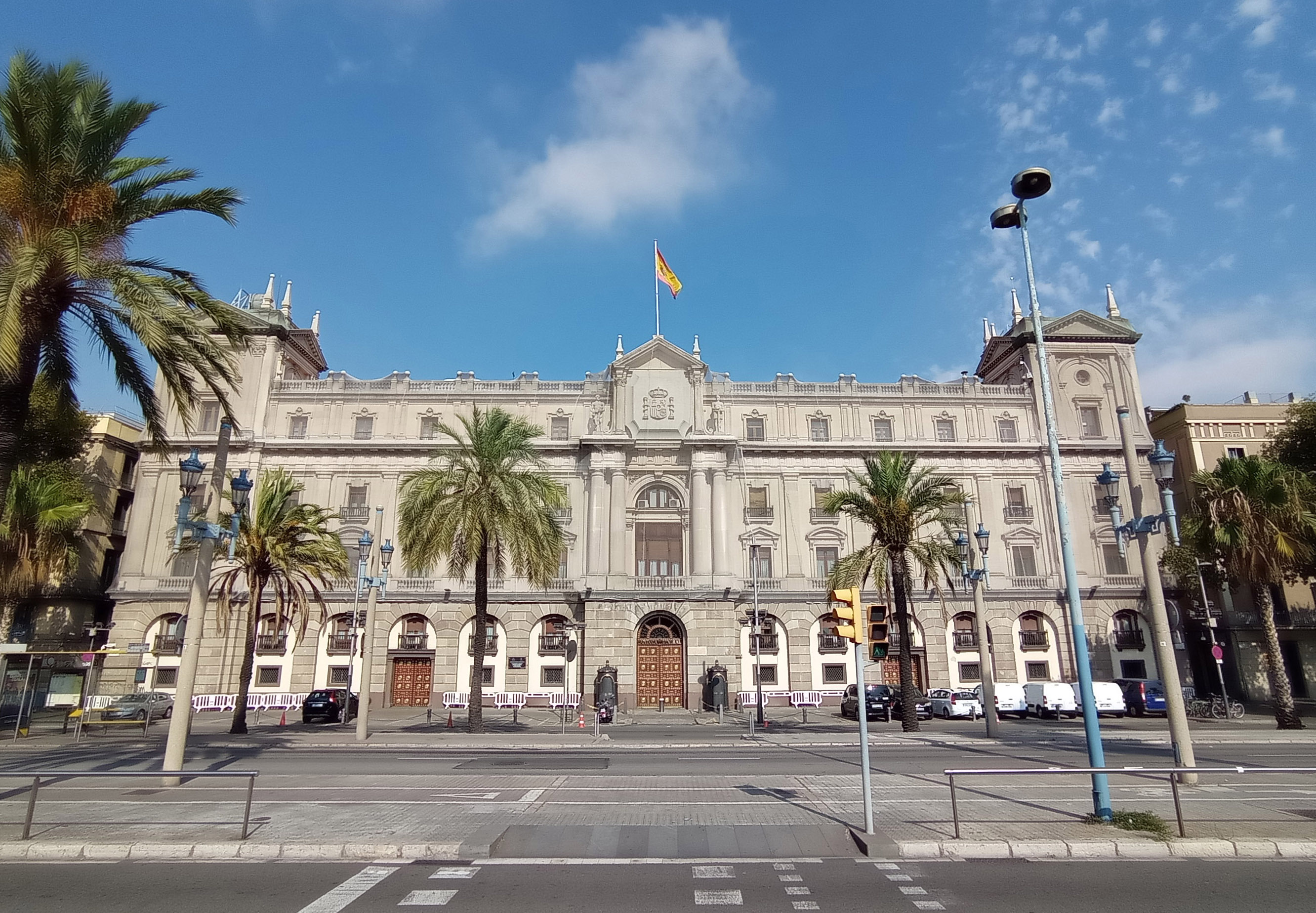
Palace of the General Captaincy of Catalonia (Barcelona).

Around 3:20 a.m. the interim civil governor of Barcelona sent a telegram to the Minister of the Interior informing him of the conversation he had had by telephone with Primo de Rivera in which the latter had informed him that "the garrisons of the four Catalan provinces had declared a state of war, acting on their own, since the Junta of Authorities had not been held". One or two hours later, General Lossada, military governor of Barcelona, communicated to the minister that he had occupied the civil government in the name of the captain general. The same happened in Zaragoza and Huesca, where strategic places such as banks, prisons, telephone and telegraph exchanges, etc., were also taken by the military, thanks to the fact that General José Sanjurjo managed to convince the Captain General of Aragón, Palanca, to "abstain" from intervening.

At 5:00 a.m. soldiers began to post posters in the streets of Barcelona with the proclamation declaring the state of war. An hour later, a speech by Primo de Rivera was read to the troops of the Barcelona garrison in which he congratulated them for the patriotism and discipline they had shown in "helping Mother Spain". "For my part, I prefer to bequeath to my children a warrior's jacket pierced by bullets like Don Diego de Leon, rather than a livery as a sign of servility to those who would annihilate my Motherland", Primo de Rivera also said. During that early morning Primo de Rivera had been in contact by telegraph with the rest of the captains general. The telegram he sent to the captain general of Madrid, Diego Muñoz-Cobo, read:

All the officer corps of this garrison with their generals present in my office greet you and the garrison of that region, inviting them to join in the request they make to the King for a radical change in the foreign government policy in a supreme attempt to avoid the dissolution and ruin of the Spanish nation.

The only captain general who answered him in opposition to the coup was that of Valencia, General José Zabalza, although, according to Javier Tusell, "he did not do so because he supported the Government, but because he pointed out the possible dangers for the Crown that could arise from a return to the pronunciamientos".

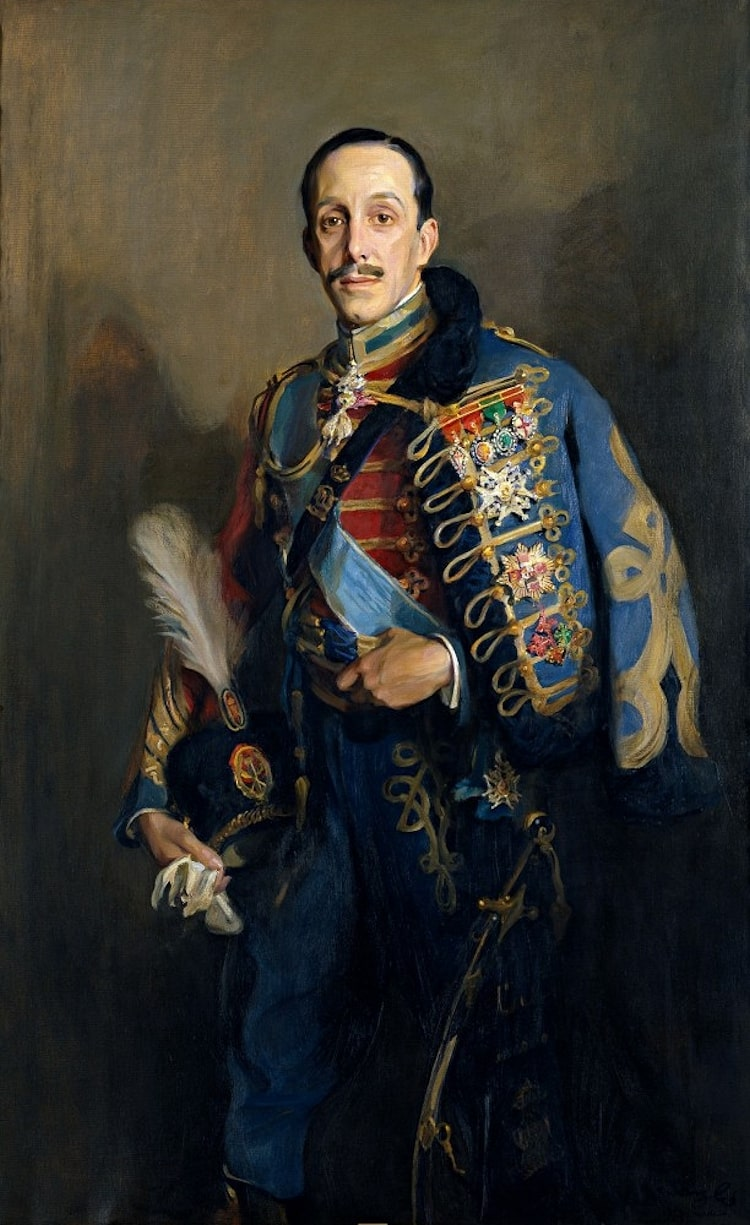
Portrait of King Alfonso XIII, dressed as a hussar (1927).

Also in the early hours of the morning —at 3:30 a.m., according to Roberto Villa García— Primo de Rivera sent a telegram to Alfonso XIII informing him of his "movement", offering him his "unconditional support" and asking him to remove "the corrupt politicians" who were damaging the "honor" and the "interest of Spain" from his side. The king then ordered the head of his Military Household, General Joaquín Milans del Bosch, to test the mood of the country's garrisons. All of them replied that they would do as the king ordered but that they "viewed the movement with sympathy". This is what some historians have called the "negative pronouncement", which would eventually prove decisive.

The king then went to rest, leaving orders not to be disturbed, so when Prime Minister García Prieto called back, he did not get on the phone. Hours before, the Minister of State, Santiago Alba, who was in San Sebastian accompanying Alfonso XIII in the role of Minister of the Day, had presented his resignation to the king —after failing in his attempt to have Primo de Rivera removed from office—. In the text in which he explained his decision, Alba affirmed that the conspirators were "mistaken" and assured that by resigning he was leaving the Government in better conditions "to facilitate all the solutions" —since his presence in the cabinet was one of the reasons alleged by the promoters of the coup—.

Throughout the 13th, Primo de Rivera —nervous due to the lack of news from the king— gave the slogan to his subordinates to "wait and resist" and dedicated himself to making various reassuring statements to the press, avoiding all embarrassing questions and lashing out against "the politicians". He also behaved "as if he were the incarnation of the legal government and not a mutinous military [and] inaugurated a furniture exhibition in Barcelona, amidst the acclamations of an euphoric public, before which he paid a demonstrative homage to the Catalan language". The newspaper La Vanguardia published that the people of Barcelona had made "spontaneous demonstrations to General Primo de Rivera that leave no doubt as to the cordial interest with which our city regards the attempt made". He also gave an account of the "parade" of personalities and authorities through the Captaincy General to show their support.

However, according to Ben-Ami, Primo de Rivera realized the military isolation in which he found himself, since outside of Catalonia and Aragon, no general had seconded him. In fact, throughout the day several military governors communicated to the Minister of the Interior their loyalty to the constitutional government, and some even went so far as to take measures so that all military units would be quartered. Nor was the attitude of the Civil Guard rebellious, and even in Catalonia it had not joined the coup ("our contingents will remain on the sidelines", declared the commander of the Civil Guard in Barcelona). A journalist later recounted the "desolating impression" he got when he visited the headquarters of the Captaincy General on 13 September:

General Primo de Rivera was practically alone, surrounded only by his aides and six or seven staff officers. [...] Our impression at that time was that if the government had had enough courage to send a company of the Civil Guard, the coup d'état would have been a failure....

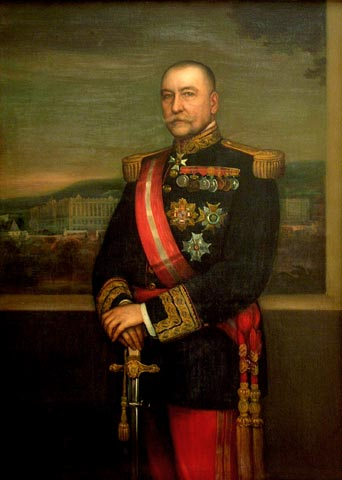
The Captain General of Madrid Diego Muñoz-Cobos refused to carry out the order of the Government to arrest the generals of the Quadrilateral if it was not signed by King Alfonso XIII.

At twelve o'clock in the morning —at half past five in the morning, according to Roberto Villa García— the government issued a note stating that "gathered in permanent council, it fulfilled its duty to remain at its posts, which it would only abandon by force if the promoters of the sedition decided to face the consequences of their actions". But the truth was that the government was divided. According to the historian Javier Tusell, only two ministers expressed their frontal opposition to the coup, Portela Valladares —who in Zaragoza, having been informed that the coup had been advanced and that it had also triumphed there, had been forced to suspend his trip to Barcelona and return to Madrid around four in the morning— and Admiral Aznar, while the rest hesitated. The news coming from the captaincies was not reassuring, since only the captains general of Valencia and Seville, General Zabalza and General Carlos de Borbón, cousin of the king, had clearly opposed Primo de Rivera, although they had not offered themselves to the government to defend the constitutional legality. Furthermore, in Valencia, the military governors of Castellón and Valencia and the colonel of the Tetuán Regiment had taken control, thus neutralizing the captain general. On the other hand, the press did not manifest itself against the coup, and some media openly supported it, including interviews with the generals involved in the conspiracy, "without anyone preventing or denouncing it", as Javier Tusell points out.

The only strong support the government found was from the veteran general Valeriano Weyler, chief of the Central General Command, so it was proposed that he move to Barcelona from Mallorca, where he was on vacation. But his mission was doomed to failure from the moment that the Minister of the Navy, Admiral Aznar, did not send a warship to Mallorca, arguing that "once [the uprising] had spread to the interior and, not wanting to provoke a civil war", the role of the Navy should be "passive".

Another of the decisions taken by the government was to order the captain general of Madrid, General Diego Muñoz-Cobo, to arrest the four generals of the Quadrilateral, but he refused unless the order was signed by the king. As Ben-Ami has noted, "in fact, for all practical purposes, Muñoz-Cobo acted as if he were a member of the conspiracy. He was reluctant, he said, to fight against the pronunciados for fear of dividing the army and provoking 'another Alcolea'". Faced with the attitude of the Captain General of Madrid, the government sought the support of the General Director of the Civil Guard and the General Commander of the Security Guard, but both replied that, although they would not revolt, "neither would they take up arms against their colleagues in the Army". He also tried to get General Pío Suárez Inclán (brother of the Minister of Finance) to go to the headquarters of the Captaincy General and replace Muñoz-Cobo, but he replied that he lacked the strength to obey him and that "any attempt at resistance would be in vain, because all the corps were in agreement with the movement, and if they left the barracks it would not be precisely to support the Government". When Captain General Muñoz-Cobo received a telegram from the head of the King's Military Household, General Milans del Bosch, in which the latter asked him about his attitude towards the "movement", he replied that "the troops were at his [the King's] disposal", but that "the Government would have to leave". Thus, "the government did not have military control of Madrid" so "it was then forced to wait for Alfonso XIII's decision".

"Alfonso XIII took it calmly. After getting up at half past nine in the morning, he met with Minister Santiago Alba, who had resigned that same night, at about ten o'clock. Displaying his traditional lightness of speech, the king told Alba that, if he gave power to Primo, "the greatest torture for him would be to have to deal daily with such a peacock". The monarch then decided not to travel to Madrid immediately and to postpone his departure until the evening and in the meantime to check the situation in the barracks. Milans del Bosch was gathering information from various captaincies, which, for the most part, showed their subordination to the king and sympathy for the pronunciamiento". By mid-morning Alfonso XIII had held an hour and a half interview with the head of the Conservative Party, Jose Sanchez Guerra, and there has been speculation as to whether he even offered him the presidency of the Government (which Sanchez Guerra would have rejected).

At the end of the afternoon Alfonso XIII finally sent a telegram to Primo de Rivera in which he limited himself to telling him to maintain order in Barcelona —there was no mention of his "movement"—, as well as informing him that that very night he would leave for Madrid. "It was not an open support for the coup d'état, but it did incite Primo to continue with the pronunciamiento. The Marquis of Estella acted quickly and immediately informed all the captains general, the military governors of Region IV and the journalists of the royal telegram. He wanted to give the impression that the coup already had the definitive support of the king". At eight o'clock in the evening, Alfonso XIII took the train to Madrid.

=== 14 September: Resignation of the government ===
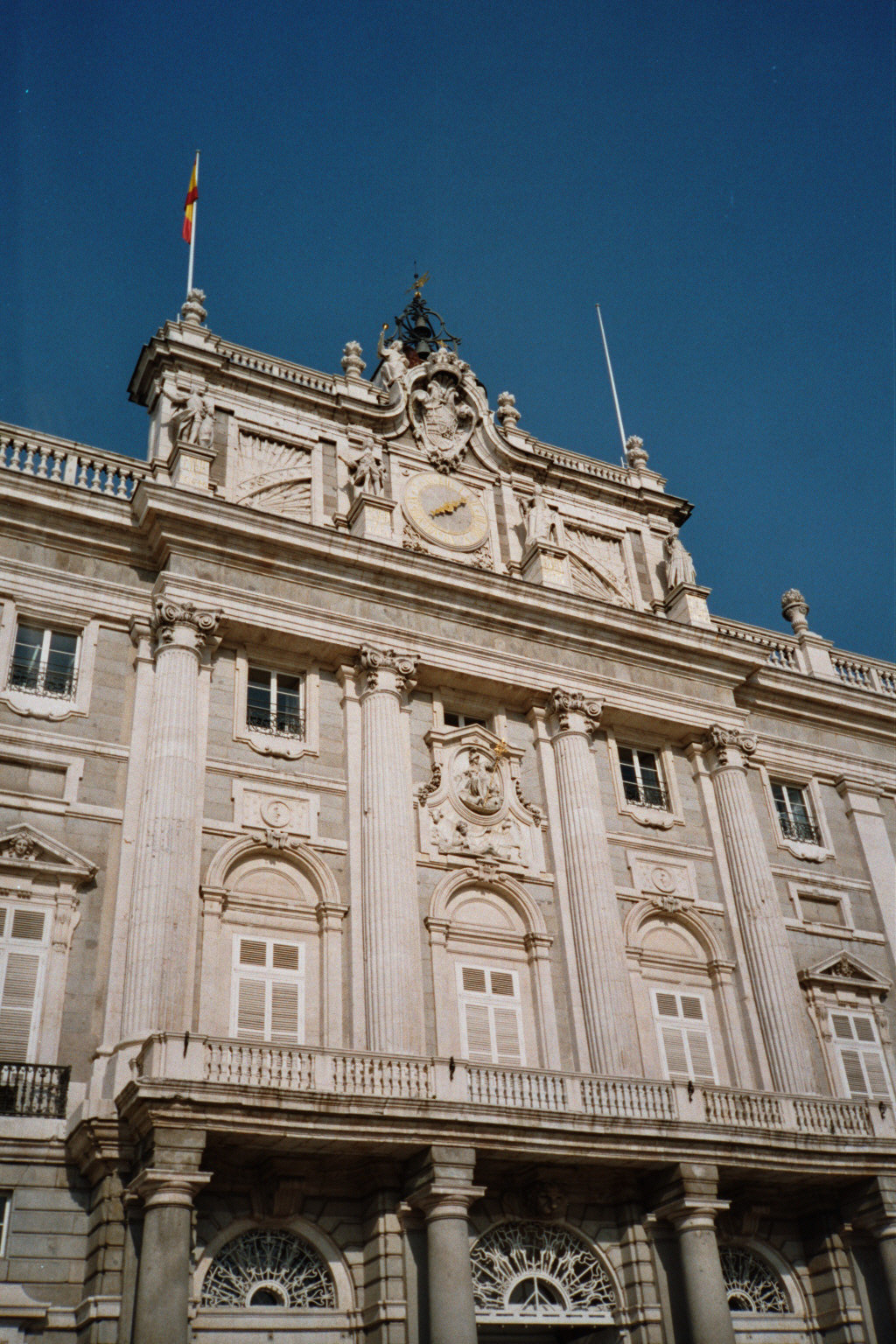
Facade of the Palacio de Oriente in Madrid.

As the Oviedo newspaper Región headlined: "Everything now depends on the king". "The fate of Spain is in the hands of the King", published the republican Heraldo de Madrid. Alfonso XIII arrived in the capital at nine o'clock in the morning of 14 September —"with the uniform of captain general and a smile from ear to ear"—, being received by the Government at the Estación del Norte. Captain General Muñoz-Cobo was also present and told the king: "Sir, it is necessary that I speak with you as soon as possible". Alfonso XIII summoned him to the Palace at eleven o'clock, and the President of the Government, García Prieto, was told to go to see him immediately. According to Ben-Ami, "in his long and deliberately slow trip from San Sebastian to Madrid —a trip "of inadequate slowness to the gravity of the situation", as El Socialista wrote—, he compared the data and clarified his doubts, and when he arrived in the capital on the morning of the 14th, he was already convinced that the majority of the garrisons of Spain, although loyal to the government, were ready to abide by its decision, and that no active movement, civil or military, in favor of the government had arisen".

When the King met in the Palacio de Oriente with the President of the Government Manuel García Prieto, he rejected his proposal to convene the Cortes for Tuesday, 18 September, with the purpose of examining "the charges made against the Government" —in reference to the Manifesto of Primo de Rivera— and to purge "the responsibilities of the men who have governed and of those who have not allowed to govern", in order to establish "clearly the result of the actions of each one". And when García Prieto proposed the dismissal of the rebellious military commanders, "but indicating at the same time that he did not know if he would have the strength to carry it out, the King replied that he needed to think about it and consult with his military advisors, which in a regime such as that of the Restoration was equivalent to suggesting resignation". During the interview, the king had asked the President of the Government how and with what means he intended to make "the proposed dismissals effective and how to arrest, judge and punish the officers addicted to the military movement". "He did not get an answer, nor could he get one," commented Roberto Villa García. The Madrid garrison had already adhered to Primo de Rivera's coup. García Prieto resigned, feeling, according to Javier Tusell, a sense of "relief at being freed from the responsibilities of power". Apparently he told Captain General Muñoz-Cobo: "I already have another saint to whom I can entrust myself, Saint Miguel Primo de Rivera, because he has taken the nightmare of the Government off my shoulders". However, Niceto Alcalá-Zamora wrote in his Memoirs that when he visited García Prieto he found him resigned and depressed.

The Minister of the Interior sent the following telegram to the civil governors of all the provinces explaining the circumstances and the reasons for the resignation of the government:

The President has given an account to Your Majesty of all the news the Government had and proposing to you, in compliance with the agreement of the Council of Ministers of yesterday, the immediate relief of the Captains General of Catalonia and Saragossa and the separation from their posts of the others who have been significant in the movement, as well as the convocation of the Cortes for next Tuesday in order that the charges made against the Government may be examined in them and the responsibilities of the men who have governed may be purged, and His Majesty having served to manifest that, both because of the lack of sufficient elements of judgment and because of the importance of the measures proposed, he needed to reflect, the Sr. President hastened to respectfully return the Powers with which the King had honored him, presenting the resignation of the entire Government.

That same morning Primo de Rivera sent a telegram to Captain General Muñoz-Cobo of Madrid, which was actually addressed to the King, in which he urged the monarch to take a decision, threatening that "this resolution, today moderate, we would give it a bloody character".

I beg Your Excellency to respectfully present His Majesty the King with the urgency to resolve the question raised, in respect of which [sic] I receive continuous and valuable adhesions. We have reason and therefore we have strength, which we have used with moderation until now. If by an ability they want to lead us to compromises that would dishonor us before our own consciences, we would demand [sic] sanctions and impose them. But neither I nor my garrisons, nor those of Aragon from which I have just received communication to this effect, will compromise with anything other than what is requested. If the politicians, in class defense, form a united front, we will form it, but with the healthy people, who store up so many rebellions against them, and to this resolution, today moderate, we will give it a bloody character.

To put even more pressure on the king, Primo de Rivera revealed the content of the telegram to the journalists and also announced that he had ordered a military judge to open a process against Santiago Alba, the resigned Minister of State, who, warned by two military friends, had already crossed the French border with his whole family.

At eleven o'clock in the morning, Alfonso XIII met with the Captain General of Madrid, General Muñoz-Cobo. He informed him that the garrison of the capital supported Primo de Rivera and that he had only managed not to make it public and to delay the proclamation of the state of war until the arrival of the king, but on condition that the monarch would sanction the victory of the uprising. Then Muñoz-Cobo asked him for permission to declare a state of war in Madrid and in all of Spain, but Alfonso XIII resisted, so he contacted the generals of the Quadrilateral and the five of them went to the Palace to convince him. They told him that the "whole Army" was addicted to Primo de Rivera's movement and opposed to any government of "weak", "corrupt" and "impotent" politicians to re-establish the principle of authority and order. A harsh discussion with the King ensued, during which General Cavalcanti went so far as to say "that they were the ones in charge for the good of Spain and for the good of the King himself". Muñoz-Cobo intervened to calm things down and reassured the king that the legality would be complied with in the transfer of powers to Primo de Rivera and that a state of war would be declared with a "very humanitarian" proclamation. At the exit of the meeting, the five generals informed the journalists that Alfonso XIII "had accepted the situation" and that "the captain general of Catalonia" was going to be "in charge of the Government".

At a quarter past one in the afternoon, the king telephoned Primo de Rivera to come to the capital and appointed an interim Directory presided over by General Muñoz-Cobo as Captain General of Madrid and composed of the generals of the Quadrilateral. Muñoz-Cobo then declared a state of war in the I Military Region. Following the instructions of the interim Directory, the rest of the general captains did the same. "The coup had triumphed".

=== 15 September: The coup succeeds ===
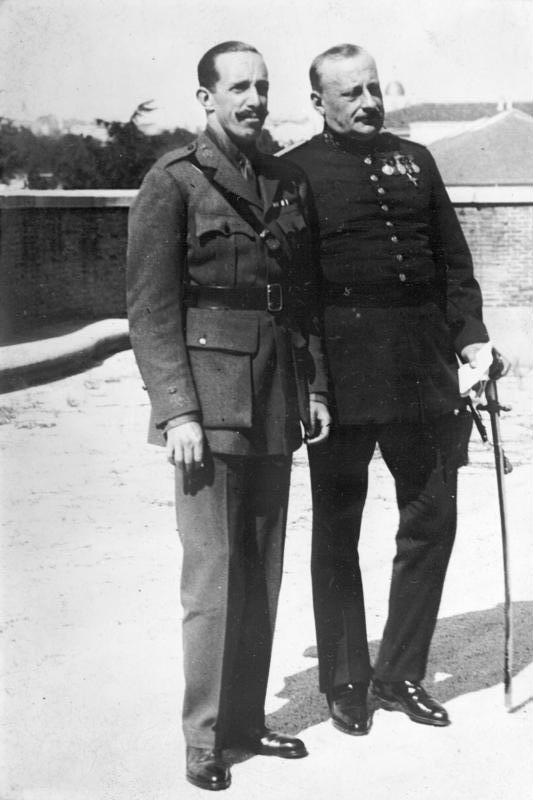
Alfonso XIII with General Miguel Primo de Rivera after his appointment as Head of the Government and President of the Military Directory.

In Barcelona an enthusiastic crowd accompanied Primo de Rivera to take the train that would take him to Madrid. As the newspaper La Vanguardia reported, a "similar phenomenon" had never been seen before. As a cenetista witness recalled, on the platforms gathered "the highest level of the Barcelona reaction, all the monarchists, the bishop, the traditionalists and also a good representation of the Lliga Regionalista. A good representation of the employers' association was also present". The last to say goodbye was the Mayor of Barcelona, the Marquis of Alella, who embraced the Captain General. The tributes were repeated at the stops made by the train: Sitges, Reus, Caspe —where General Sanjurjo joined the train—, Zaragoza —where he was received by Captain General Palanca— and Guadalajara.

Around 9:40 a.m. on 15 September, Primo de Rivera arrived in Madrid. "He began his military dictatorship with a king. At the Atocha station he received a standing ovation from the hundreds of people who were waiting for him and who shouted "Long live the redeemer of the Motherland, Spain, and the King, and down with the politicians!". Before going to the Palacio de Oriente he met with the generals of the Quadrilateral and with the Captain General of Madrid Muñoz-Cobo, who had come to receive him at the station, to whom he informed that instead of forming a civil government under military tutelage he had decided to become the sole dictator at the head of a "Militar Directory". Muñoz-Cobo, opposed to the idea as were the generals of the Quadrilateral, communicated to the king Primo de Rivera's intention to resort to this formula which was not included in the Constitution of 1876.

When Primo de Rivera and the king met that same morning at the Palacio de Oriente, they agreed on a solution that would keep the appearance of constitutional legality. Primo de Rivera would be named "Head of the Government" and "sole minister", assisted by a Militar Directory, made up of eight generals and a rear admiral. It was also established that Primo de Rivera would take the oath of office according to the established protocol, before the Minister of Justice of the previous government. He did so that same afternoon, although changing the traditional formula: Primo de Rivera swore his loyalty to the motherland and to the king, and "to the purpose of reestablishing the rule of the Constitution as soon as Your Majesty accepts the Government that I propose", which meant that the Constitution had been suspended indefinitely. According to some sources, during the conversation they had, the king told Primo de Rivera: "God grant you to succeed. I am going to give you power".

With journalists Primo de Rivera was intentionally vague as to the duration of his government. He intended to stay "fifteen, twenty, thirty days; as long as necessary until the country gives us the men to govern", but he left open the possibility of continuing once the Militar Directory had fulfilled its function and declared that he would have "no difficulty in presiding" over the future government. "If the country designates me to preside over it, I will abide by its decision, whatever it may be", he added. In the afternoon, after having taken possession of his new office in the Buenavista Palace, he again declared to journalists: "We are here to make a radical transformation and to extirpate the roots of the old Spanish politics, in accordance with the longing of the Spanish people. There are things that are over in Spain forever". Asked if he was going to dissolve the Parliament, he answered: "Naturally". He also took the opportunity to accuse Santiago Alba, the Minister of State, of being corrupt and a thief, and affirmed that Alba's conduct had been "the drop of water, the circumstantial motive that has driven us to the movement". In a telegram sent to the general captains he reiterated what he had stated to the journalists: "this Directory intends that soon the country returns to the constitutional normality and is ruled by free citizens, who, broken the political organizations, will sprout in the number and with the capacity that the race treasures".

The Gaceta de Madrid of the following day published the Royal Decree, signed by the King and countersigned by the Minister of Grace and Justice Antonio López Muñoz, again to keep the appearance of legality, which read: "I am appointing as Head of the Government Lieutenant General Miguel Primo de Rivera y Orbaneja, Marquis of Estella". In the same issue of the Gaceta de Madrid of 16 September appeared the first Royal Decree that Primo de Rivera had presented to the King for his signature, by which a Militar Directory was created, presided over by him and which would have "all the faculties, initiatives and responsibilities inherent to a Government as a whole, but with a single signature" and which was proposed "to constitute a brief parenthesis in the constitutional march of Spain". In its "Exposition", which was spread by the press under the headline "A historic decree", it was said:

EXPOSITION

Sir: Appointed by Your Majesty with the task of forming a Government in difficult times for the country, which I have contributed to provoke, inspired by the highest patriotic feelings, it would be cowardly desertion to hesitate in accepting the post that carries with it so many responsibilities and obliges me to such exhausting and incessant work. But Your Majesty knows well that neither I, nor the persons who with me have propagated and proclaimed the new regime, believe ourselves qualified for the concrete performance of the ministerial portfolios, and that it was and still is our purpose to constitute a brief parenthesis in the constitutional march of Spain, to establish it as soon as the country offers us men not infected with the vices that we impute to the political organizations, so that we can offer them to Your Majesty so that normality may be soon reestablished. For this reason I allow myself to offer to Your Majesty the formation of a militar Directory, presided over by myself, which, without the allocation of portfolios or categories of ministers, will have all the faculties, initiatives and responsibilities inherent to a Government as a whole, but with a single signature, which I will submit to Your Majesty; for which reason I must be the only one who, before Your Majesty and the notary major of the Kingdom, and with all the unction and patriotism that the solemn act requires, bows the knee to the ground before the Holy Gospels, swearing allegiance to the Motherland and the King and to the purpose of re-establishing the rule of the Constitution as soon as Your Majesty accepts the Government that I propose to you. In this aspect, Sir, the country has received us with a clamorous welcome and comfortable hope; and we believe it is an elementary duty to modify the essence of our actions, which can have no other justification before History and the Motherland than selflessness and patriotism. Madrid, 15 September 1923.

Sir: A.L.R.P. of V.M. Miguel Primo de Rivera.

In the 1st article of the Royal Decree, Primo de Rivera was conferred the position of "President of the Militar Directory in charge of the Government of the State, with powers to propose to me as many decrees as may be convenient for public health, which will have the force of law". Article 2 established that the Directory would be formed by its president and eight brigadier generals, one for each military region, plus a rear admiral of the Navy. In the 4th, the posts of President of the Council of Ministers, Ministers of the Crown and Undersecretaries were abolished, except for the Undersecretaries of State and War. On the 17th the Gaceta de Madrid published the dissolution of the Congress of Deputies and of the elective part of the Senate, in accordance with the power conferred on the King by Article 32 of the Constitution, although with the obligation to convene them again within three months. On 12 November, the presidents of the Congress and the Senate, Melquiades Álvarez and the Count of Romanones, respectively, presented themselves before the king so that he would convene the Cortes, reminding him that this was his duty as constitutional monarch. The response they received was their immediate dismissal from the two positions they held. Primo de Rivera justified it with these words:

The country is no longer impressed with movies of liberal and democratic essences; it wants order, work and economy.

In an interview published on 24 January 1924 by the British newspaper Daily Mail, King Alfonso XIII justified his decision:

I accepted the military Dictatorship because Spain and the Army wanted it to put an end to anarchy, parliamentary debauchery and the claudicating weakness of political men. I accepted it as Italy had to accept fascism because communism was its immediate threat. And because it was necessary to employ an energetic therapy on the malignant tumors we were suffering from in the Peninsula and in Africa.

== Reactions to the coup ==
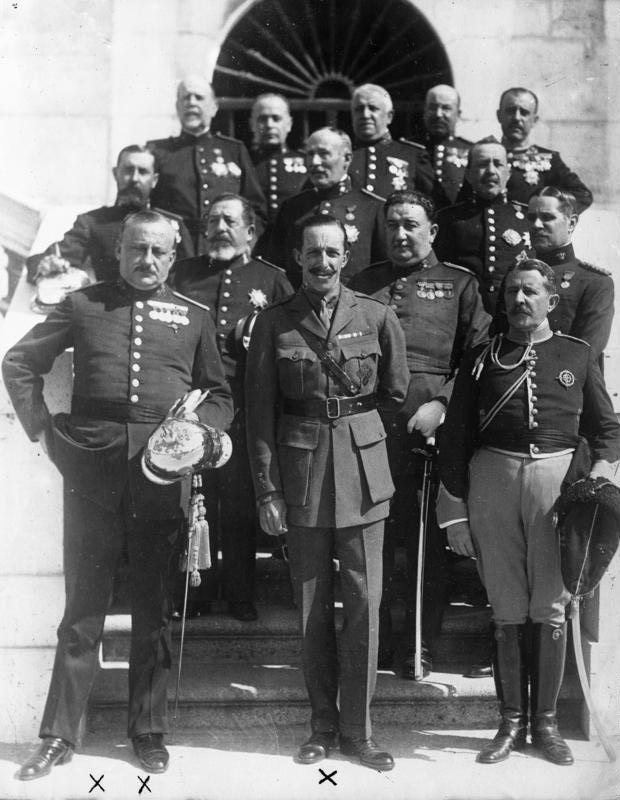
From left to right (in bold the generals members of the Militar Directory and in brackets the number of the military region they represent; in italics, the four generals members of the Quadrilateral): General Primo de Rivera, King Alfonso XIII, and General José Cavalcanti de Alburquerque, in the front row; General Antonio Mayandía Gómez (5th), General Federico Berenguer Fusté and General Leopoldo Saro Marín, in the second row; General Antonio Dabán Vallejo, General Francisco Ruiz del Portal (7th) and General Luis Navarro y Alonso de Celada (3rd), in the third row; General Luis Hermosa y Kith (2nd), General Dalmio Rodríguez Pedré (4th), General Adolfo Vallespinosa Vior (1st), General Francisco Gómez-Jordana Sousa (6th), and General Mario Muslera y Planes (8th), in the last row.

According to historian Shlomo Ben-Ami, "the public reaction to the coup d'état was, on the whole, favorable" —although other historians describe it as passive or indifferent benevolence or "a mixture of prevention, satisfaction and impotence"— which is largely explained "by the fact that the system that Primo de Rivera came to replace did not enjoy great support among the masses". Alejandro Quiroga agrees with Ben-Ami: the coup was "well received by very diverse political and social groups. On the right, the social Catholics, the Carlists, the Catholic fundamentalists, the Maurists and the Catalanists of the Lliga Regionalista. Even some intellectuals and liberal newspapers, such as El Sol, declared their sympathies for what they believed to be a temporary dictatorship. The chambers of commerce and industry, the Spanish Employers' Confederation, numerous professional organizations and the Church also made public their support for the insurrection of the Marquis of Estella". Also Javier Moreno Luzón: "there was a shortage of those who resisted the cuartelazo, supported or tolerated by very diverse political and social sectors".

"Primo's manipulation of the regenerationist slogans made many think that at last "justice would be done" and caciquismo would be eradicated", added Ben-Ami. Thus, for example, the liberal newspaper El Sol avoided that the new regime had been established by means of a coup d'état and in its editorial welcomed "a nobler and more fertile Spain than the old and ruinous one in which we were born", although adding that, "once the work of uprooting the old regime and internally sanitizing the organism of the State was finished", the Directory should cede power to a liberal civilian government —in fact, when the newspaper soon found out that Primo de Rivera's intention was to perpetuate himself in power, it withdrew its support—. "The people saw in the indomitable generalship the salvation of the fatherland", wrote later the socialist jurist Luis Jiménez de Asúa.

Francisco Alía Miranda stressed that "one of the most surprising facts" was "the uniformity with which the military behaved on 13 September". "Something had to have changed in the Army so that the military, so divided in the previous years [between Africanists and junteros], all had the same criteria at that moment".

As for the workers' forces, the anarcho-syndicalists were caught by surprise by the coup and "many cenetistas limited themselves to passively waiting for the authorities to close their offices. The CNT was exhausted from years of brutal repression and was already almost useless as an instrument of combat". Even so, the CNT formed an "Action Committee against the war and the dictatorship" which called a strike in Madrid and Bilbao, supported by the Communists, which had little echo. The Socialists were invited to join the Committee but they opted to remain on the sidelines and the leaderships of the PSOE and the UGT warned their affiliates not to intervene in any revolutionary attempt, since they would only serve as "a pretext for repressions that reaction craves for its advantage", according to the newspaper El Socialista. In the joint manifesto published on 13 September, the PSOE and the UGT recommended maintaining a passive attitude towards the new regime, which they considered to be an extension of the "old politics". For its part, the CNT published on 18 September in its official newspaper Solidaridad Obrera that "if the coup d'état does not have as its mission to go against the workers, against the liberties they have, against the improvements achieved and against the economic and moral demands which have gradually been obtained, our attitude will be very different than if all this, which is the product of many years of struggle, is vilified, not respected or attacked".

Among the intellectuals, those who opposed the coup were few, "only Miguel de Unamuno, Manuel Azaña and Ramón Pérez de Ayala were unequivocally against the dictator," says historian Genoveva García Queipo de Llano. Also the Republican Vicente Blasco Ibáñez, "perhaps the most popular Spanish writer in the world", who from exile in Paris "became the main scourge against the dictatorship and the monarchy". For his part, the veteran Republican leader Alejandro Lerroux wrote three years after the coup that "the dictatorship arose like the sun in the middle of a storm". It was a reaction "against the dominant oligarchy in the country, thus initiating a new period in our history, and with it the resurrection of the Motherland".

The upper classes received the coup with euphoria, especially in Catalonia. The Chamber of Commerce and Industry of Catalonia greeted the dictator "with the greatest enthusiasm", hoping that he would put an end "to a state of affairs that was considered intolerable". So did the rest of the employers' organizations, such as the Catalan Agricultural Institute of San Isidro, which hoped that "the demolishing currents of the right to property" would be stopped. And also the conservative Catalan political parties such as the Lliga Regionalista or the Unión Monárquica Nacional. The latter considered itself part of the "regeneration movement" based on the principles of "motherland, monarchy and social order". Outside Catalonia there were the same signs of enthusiasm among the upper classes and various employers' organizations offered to collaborate with the Dictatorship to "destroy at a stroke the rottenness which, against all justice and morality, is leading the country, slowly but inexorably, to the most unfathomable precipice", as the Spanish Confederation of Employers proclaimed. As the historian Ángeles Barrio has pointed out, "the attitude of the Spanish bourgeoisies was no different from that of other European bourgeoisies of order which, faced with the danger of Bolshevism, did nothing to defend the validity of a liberal order ready to democratize with which they did not identify, and in which they sensed that their interests were not sufficiently guaranteed".

The Catholic Church in Spain also supported the coup. The Cardinal of Tarragona, Vidal y Barraquer praised the "noble effort" of the "pundonoroso" General Primo de Rivera. The National Catholic-Agrarian Confederation welcomed him and offered its support to "strengthen authority, social discipline and the recovery of morale". The Catholic newspaper El Debate hoped that the dictator would order a campaign "of moral sanitation, persecuting gambling, pornography, alcoholism and other social scourges". And a Catholic newspaper of Cordoba even predicted that if Primo de Rivera failed, the path would be opened to the "overflowing torrent of Bolshevism". The newly created Catholic party, the Partido Social Popular, with the notable exception of Ángel Ossorio y Gallardo, enthusiastically welcomed what it called the new "national movement", as well as the Maurists who considered the Dictatorship, "whatever the anomalies of its origin", as the beginning of the "resurgence of Spain". Even the Carlists supported it, because, as the pretender Don Jaime said, it represented "a rapprochement to our doctrines" and "the expression of the purely traditionalist spirit". Within Carlism those who showed more enthusiasm were the Mellistas, such as Víctor Pradera or Salvador Minguijón. Juan Vázquez de Mella himself invited the Directory to "remain for an indefinite period of time":

The Muslim danger joins the red danger, and the two to the Jewish danger, true spiritual director of the Revolution, and they set out this dilemma, between whose extremes the peoples of Europe and America will soon have to choose: either the dictatorship of order, to save themselves and restore what has been overthrown, or the red dictatorship of Bolshevism. [...] If the Directory understands well this lesson of things that are taking place all over the world, and against which the claims of the fallen can do nothing, it will have to continue in power for a long time.

As for the two parties of the turn, according to Ben-Ami, "they seemed relieved by Primo de Rivera's decision to temporarily anesthetize Spanish politics". "Although some of them [its members] were certainly willing to democratize the system, none felt ready yet to challenge the king's undisputed position as creator and overthrower of governments. In the final analysis, some "politicians" mistakenly perceived the coup d'état, as it turned out, as a "crisis", expecting that they would be charged with solving it like gentlemen and within the established framework of the system's "crisis management", as they had done with so many others in the past". The liberal Diario Universal wrote:

We do not doubt that the triumphant movement is inspired by the purest patriotic ideals, and, just thinking about it, it is possible to expect from that movement the good of Spain.

== Role of the king ==
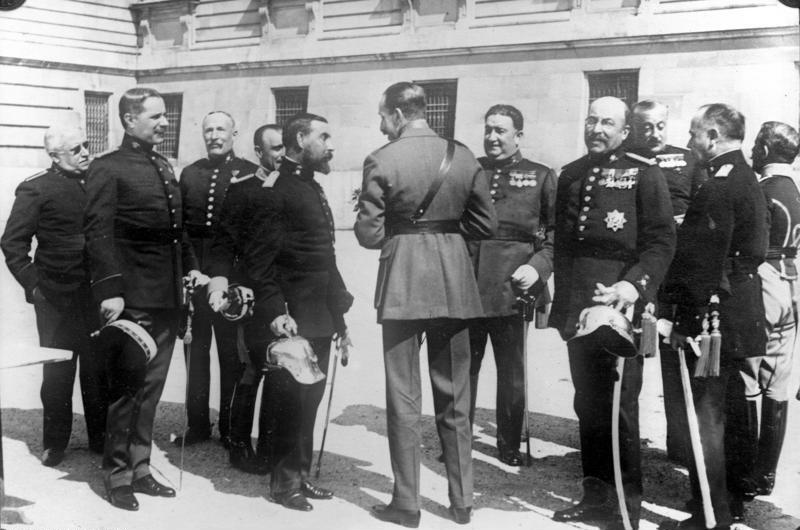
King Alfonso XIII, in the center and with his back to the camera, talks with General Antonio Dabán Vallejo, a member of the Quadrilateral. On the right, looking at the camera and holding a helmet, General Francisco Gómez-Jordana Sousa, member of the Militar Directory, representing the IV Military Region. In the center, in the background, General Federico Berenguer Fusté, member of the Quadrilateral and brother of General Dámaso Berenguer, accused in the Picasso file. General Primo de Rivera appears on the right in the background talking with General José Cavalcanti de Alburquerque, founder of the Quadrilátero. On the left, looking at the conversation between the King and General Dabán, General Leopoldo Saro Marín, member of the Quadrilátero.

The socialist Indalecio Prieto, in an article written shortly after Primo de Rivera's coup, pointed to the monarch Alfonso XIII himself as the instigator of the coup in order to prevent the Commission of Responsibilities for the Annual Disaster from being able to formulate any kind of accusation. The article ended as follows:

What interest could the Crown have in facilitating the triumph of the military movement? The Cortes were going to be opened, the problem of responsibilities for the Melilla disaster, which had already brought the previous Parliament to a halt, and in the debate, perhaps with mutual accusations, the parties of the regime would be torn apart and high personal responsibilities would once again appear... Perhaps this devastating spectacle would cause the mutiny to arise in the streets. The military sedition, protected and tutored from above, could frustrate it. And the strange uprising arose, an uprising of Royal Order.

Eight years later, in the early morning of 20 November 1931, the Constituent Courts of the Republic declared guilty of "high treason" "the one who was king of Spain":

who, exercising the powers of his magistracy against the Constitution of the State, has committed the most criminal violation of the legal order of his country, and, consequently, the Sovereign Court of the Nation solemnly declares Mr. Alfonso de Borbón y Habsburgo-Lorena to be outside the Law. Deprived of legal peace, any Spanish citizen will be able to seize his person if he enters national territory. Don Alfonso de Borbón will be stripped of all his dignities, rights and titles, which he will not be able to legally hold either inside or outside Spain, of which the Spanish people, through their representatives elected to vote the new rules of the Spanish State, declares him to be deposed, without him ever being able to claim them either for himself or for his successors. All the goods, rights and shares of his property that are in the national territory will be seized, for the benefit of the State, which will arrange the convenient use that should be given to them.

The president of the Provisional Government, Manuel Azaña, addressing the deputies, said: "with this vote the second proclamation of the Republic in Spain takes place". Years after the condemnation by the Republic, the role of the king in the 1923 coup d'état and his actions during the Dictatorship have been the subject of debate among historians. According to Shlomo Ben-Ami, "Alfonso XIII had for years shown absolutist tendencies, a strong desire to rule without parliament, a rigid, undemocratic courtly etiquette, and manifested an unhealthy admiration for the army, in the promotion of whose officers he was the main arbiter". Eduardo González Calleja indicates that "the king's dislike for the practice of the parliamentary system increased after the military disaster of 1921". This is what he stated on 23 May 1921 in a speech delivered in Cordoba, in which, after affirming that "the parliament does not fulfill its duty" (since debates take place in it whose purpose is to prevent projects from prospering, in the service of political ends) and that "those who listen to me may think that I am violating the constitution", he affirmed:

I believe that the provinces should begin a work of support to their king and to the projects that are beneficial, and then the Parliament will remember that it is the mandatary of the people: inside and outside the Constitution it would have to impose itself and sacrifice itself for the good of the Motherland.

He reiterated these criticisms during a fraternal meal with the officers of the Barcelona garrison held on 7 June 1922 in a restaurant in the town of Las Planas, in which he told them: "always remember that you have no other commitment than the respect given to your country and your King". A year later, in a speech delivered in Salamanca, he approved the possibility of the establishment of a provisional dictatorship whose task would be "to make way for governments that respected the will of the people". According to Eduardo Gonzalez Calleja, Alfonso XIII gave up his idea of heading it himself after consulting with several politicians, among them Antonio Maura, and "left the way open to the military conspirators". According to Ben-Ami, "what induced King Alfonso to contemplate an extra-parliamentary "solution" was the resurrection of Spanish parliamentarism rather than its degeneration. The public debate on the responsibilities and the anti-Alfonso propaganda of the socialists... could not fail to become an unbearable nuisance for the monarch".

On the king's participation in the preparations for Primo de Rivera's coup, Javier Tusell states that there is no proof that Alfonso XIII "was the promoter of the conspiracy against the Liberal Government", although he recognizes that "the king had a fundamental coincidence with the conspirators regarding the negative judgment on the political situation". "Indiscreet and not very prudent, —adds Tusell— Alfonso XIII spoke with more than one person about a possible military authoritarian Government", ruling out a personal dictatorship because "if I decided to exercise dictatorship on my own, on the spot I would have everyone in front of me", as he told Gabriel Maura Gamazo, son of the conservative leader Antonio Maura. "The king later admitted that some of the conspirators had approached him... The contact with the conspirators was late, it probably took place only with some of the generals involved in the conspiracy in Madrid and it could well not have been taken into consideration, since Alfonso XIII was accustomed to the military coming to him with more or less veiled threats to revolt". For her part, the historian Genoveva García Queipo de Llano admits that "during the summer of 1923 the King thought of the possibility of appointing a military government of the Army as a corporation and that it would also be accepted by the politicians; this would only be a parenthesis and then return to constitutional normality", but later she quotes Primo Rivera to rule out the participation of Alfonso XIII in the coup: "the King was the first to be surprised [by the coup] and who better than I can know this?".

However, Francisco Alía Miranda has indicated that in 1936 Alfonso XIII told Charles Petrie that a few days before the coup two generals went to see him and "told him that such a state of affairs could not be allowed to continue and that the system had to be completely changed". Alía Miranda also refers to British diplomatic sources who assured that in interviews held with the British ambassador and with the Foreign Minister, "the king acknowledged having been informed of the coup preparations by two generals of the Madrid garrison and having informed García Prieto [President of the Government] of this contact". According to these sources, the interview with these generals would have taken place in the early afternoon of 4 September, although, for Alía Miranda, "perhaps it would be more accurate to bring forward the contacts of the monarch with the conspirators to the spring of 1923, since they were his close collaborators. It is also clear that the Government knew months before the pronunciamiento the existence of the conspiracy, although it did nothing to avoid it, in an incomprehensible way".

Some historians consider significant the fact that one of the first decisions taken by the newly constituted Militar Directory was to seize the archives of the Commission of Responsibilities of the Congress of Deputies which was preparing the report to be presented to the Chamber on 2 October 1923 and which was based on the file written by General Picasso on the military responsibilities in the disaster of Annual, and which, as the socialist deputy Indalecio Prieto had denounced in a much commented speech pronounced on 17 April 1923, was to implicate the king.

The king's definitive commitment to the Dictatorship occurred when he failed to comply with Article 32 of the Constitution which obliged him to summon and convene the Cortes within three months of its dissolution, as the presidents of the Senate, Count de Romanones, and of the Congress of Deputies, Melquiades Álvarez, who went to visit him at the Palacio de Oriente on 12 November, reminded him. "The interview was brief. As brief as it was not very cordial", Romanones would write. Alfonso XIII attended them "in the corner of a door", and did not allow them to give "any kind of explanation". The king referred to Primo de Rivera the note they had given him, with the request to call elections for a new Cortes, and the dictator responded by proclaiming that the country was no longer impressed by "films of liberal and democratic essence", announcing that he did not intend to convene "Cortes for a long time" and promulgating a decree by which the two presidents, as well as the respective governing bodies of both chambers, ceased their functions. Few voices were raised in defense of the dismissed presidents. "The king signed the decree and with this fact formally broke with the Constitution of 1876, to which he had sworn to comply", said José Luis Gómez-Navarro. In a letter sent to the Count of Romanones, the king justified the breach of the constitutional oath alleging that he had complied with "the tacit article of every Constitution: "To save the Motherland"". Shortly afterwards, in a statement to the Daily Mail newspaper, he assured that the dictatorship had ended with "the claudicating weakness of the politicians" and in 1925 he reiterated to Paris-Midi that "if he reopened the parliament the old parties [would] lead the country to ruin", in which he coincided with Primo de Rivera who declared on several occasions that "the parliamentary system" had "passed to history".

In spite of the warnings given to him by the former dynastic politicians —especially the conservative José Sánchez Guerra—, the king completely joined his fate to that of the Dictatorship, with no turning back, when, after resisting for more than a year, he signed in September 1927 the convocation of the National Constituent Assembly, which meant the definitive break with the Constitution of 1876 that he had sworn to —hence the nickname of "the perjured king" that began to spread—.

According to Shlomo Ben-Ami (1983),

Alfonso XIII sanctioned with his authority the victory of force. [...] By joining the rebellion against constitutional legality, the king helped to create the myth that he was "responsible" for the dictatorship. In any case, it is hard to imagine that the army would have submitted to a rebellion that had not been sanctioned by the monarch, supreme head of the armed forces and personification of the nation. A coup against the will of the king would have been "completely impossible". The sovereign's defenders claimed that he had sacrificed himself to avoid a dangerous division of the army into two antagonistic factions, a division which, they feared, would lead to civil war. Alfonso realized that he had violated the constitution, but rhetorically asked a French journalist from Le Temps: Which is better, to keep the constitution alive or to let the nation die? Whatever the truth, the myth prevailed. The fate of the king and his throne were inextricably linked, from then on, with that of the dictatorship.

According to Santos Juliá (1999),

Primo de Rivera's coup closed any possibility of finding within the constitutional monarchy the solution to the constituent problem that the different movements -worker, republican, reformist, Catalanist, military, and very representative figures of the intellectual elites- had placed at the forefront of the debate and political action since 1917.

According to Javier Tusell (2003),

What happened meant a decisive change in Spanish politics. [...] The coup d'état was promised to be short-lived and achieved widespread support, but its medium-term consequences turned out to be very serious.The King hastened to explain to the French and British ambassadors that he had had nothing to do with what had happened. But he violated the Constitution by not convening Parliament and that cost him the throne.

According to José Luis Gómez-Navarro (2003),

It is not intended to reopen the controversy about the alleged or real direct and active participation of the king in the preparations, in the inspiration or in the organization of the coup of 13 September. It is difficult to find hard evidence of this. However, the decisive role of Alfonso XIII in the triumph of the coup cannot be denied. In the first place, because during the last years of the Restoration regime (in a very evident way since 1917) it contributed in an important way to create the political and ideological conditions that favored the triumph of the coup... In all the important crises in which there were clashes between the governments —the civil power— and the army, it ended up supporting the latter, consequently weakening the civil power. [...] Secondly, there is irrefutable evidence that Alfonso XIII considered inevitable and desired a military regime of exception at least since June 1923; he knew about the preparations of the different coup groups...; during the summer of 1923, the king himself thought of leading it; when it took place, he short-circuited the government's action. [...] Thirdly, Don Alfonso, once the coup had taken place, could have resisted and not only did he not do so, but he sanctioned and regularized it.... In doing so, he assumed absolute political responsibility for the nature of the military regime of exception that was implemented.

According to Eduardo González Calleja (2005),

The king had, in any case, a clear personal responsibility in the deterioration of the political situation. After interposing himself as a traditional obstacle in the various attempts to democratize the system through the abusive use of the royal prerogative and the encouragement of militarism to the detriment of civilian power, Don Alfonso instrumentalized the military threat that loomed over the parliamentary regime to enhance his own role, going from arbiter to fundamental actor in the political game.

According to Javier Moreno Luzón (2023),

Thus, Alfonso XIII was decisive in the triumph of the coup. He shared the ideas and attitudes that justified it —nationalist, counterrevolutionary, praetorian, anti-liberal— and to these he added his faith in his own mission, as a soldier and savior of Spain. He knew at least the general outlines of the plot, but that was not the most relevant thing. At the moment of truth, he abandoned his government: he deferred disciplinary measures and did not make use of his authority over the army, which almost no one disputed, to stop the rebellion. [...] He violated not only the spirit of the Constitution, but also its letter. Article 32 imposed on the king the obligation to convoke and convene the Cortes three months after dissolving it, which guaranteed co-sovereignty. As the dissolution was published on 17 September, elections had to be held and the chambers opened before 17 December 1923. With this concern, the presidents of the Congress of Deputies, Melquiades Alvarez, and of the Senate, Count de Romanones, visited the sovereign in November.... Don Alfonso attended them in a discourteous manner —"standing in the doorway", resented Romanones—.... Faced with the stigma of the perjurer, he made it clear [later to Romanones] that he was fulfilling "the tacit article of every Constitution [:] "to save the Fatherland"".

According to Francisco Alía Miranda (2023),

According to all indications, Alfonso XIII was the one who convinced the conspiring generals in the spring of 1923 to free him from the nightmare of responsibility for the disaster of Annual, in the Moroccan war. [...] The king's involvement is not clearly demonstrated in the documentation, perhaps as is logical in a matter of such transcendence and delicacy, but it is intuited by his behavior after Primo de Rivera's announcement to take power. There are several indications that seem to be decisive. The first, the ease of the coup. The conspiracy was very simple because very little support was sought, perhaps because it was not needed given who was behind it all. The second one, the coldness with which the monarch treated the Government, continually giving long delays to a President of the Council of Ministers who urged him to take energetic action against the military coup plotters. The third, the passivity of Alfonso XIII in such transcendental hours. Still on vacation in San Sebastian, in mid-September, he returned without haste to Madrid, which gave the coup plotters valuable time which was enough for Primo de Rivera to establish his plans.

According to Roberto Villa García (2023),

The army almost en bloc only expected its supreme leader to legalize the victory of the movement. The only thing that can be asked in those circumstances is why a constitutional king did not refuse to appoint a rebel general as "head of the Government". [...] Alfonso XIII could have refused, but in order to do so he would have had to assume the "republicanization" of the triumphant movement. Moreover, with the Crown as much out of the game as the Cortes, that meant taking responsibility for turning a dictatorship of indefinite duration —but which its authors promised to be temporary— into a permanent one, and from which it would only have been possible to get away by means of another revolutionary rupture... Furthermore, the correlation of forces since the dawn of 13 September 1923 —not as a result of the disaffection of the Army with the Crown as an institution, but rather of a deep and generalized distrust towards its owner— rules out any possibility that Alfonso XIII, by his own means, could have defeated the coup. It is not convenient to analyze the 1923 coup with the blinkers of 1981, since neither the general state of Spanish politics nor the particular state of the Armed Forces —not even the relationship they maintained with the monarch— were hardly assimilable.

== See also ==
- Turno
- Fall of the dictatorship of Primo de Rivera

== Bibliography ==
- Alía Miranda, Francisco (2023). La dictadura de Primo de Rivera (1923-1930). Paradojas y contradicciones del nuevo régimen (in Spanish). Madrid: Los Libros de la Catarata. ISBN 978-84-1352-702-4.
- Barrio Alonso, Ángeles (2004). La modernización de España (1917-1939). Política y sociedad (in Spanish). Madrid: Síntesis. ISBN 84-9756-223-2.
- Ben-Ami, Shlomo (2012) [1983]. El cirujano de hierro. La dictadura de Primo de Rivera (1923-1930) [Fascism from above: Dictathorship of Primo de Rivera in Spain] (in Spanish). Barcelona: RBA. ISBN 978-84-9006-161-9.
- Cabrera, Mercedes (2021). "La sombra marroquí: Consecuencias políticas de las campañas norteafricanas". A cien años de Annual. La guerra de Marruecos (in Spanish). Epilogue by Lorenzo Silva (Daniel Macías Fernández ed.). Madrid: Desperta Ferro Ediciones. pp. 383–418. ISBN 978-84-122212-8-2.
- Cardona, Gabriel (2003a). "El Cuadrilátero". La Aventura de la Historia (in Spanish) (59).
- — (2003b). "Una sonora bofetada". La Aventura de la Historia (in Spanish) (59).
- García Queipo de Llano, Genoveva (1997). El reinado de Alfonso XIII. La modernización fallida (in Spanish). Madrid: Historia 16. ISBN 84-7679-318-9.
- Gil Pecharromán, Julio (2005). Niceto Alcalá-Zamora. Un liberal en la encrucijada (in Spanish). Madrid: Síntesis. ISBN 9788497563147.
- Gómez-Navarro, José Luis (2003). "El rey en la dictadura". Alfonso XIII. Un político en el trono (in Spanish) (Javier Moreno Luzón ed.). Madrid: Marcial Pons. pp. 337–372. ISBN 84-95379-59-7.
- González Calleja, Eduardo (2003). "El ex-rey". Alfonso XIII. Un político en el trono (in Spanish) (Javier Moreno Luzón ed.). Madrid: Marcial Pons. pp. 403–435. ISBN 84-95379-59-7.
- — (2005). La España de Primo de Rivera. La modernización autoritaria 1923-1930 (in Spanish). Madrid: Alianza Editorial. ISBN 84-206-4724-1.s
- Juliá, Santos (1999). Un siglo de España. Política y sociedad (in Spanish). Madrid: Marcial Pons. ISBN 84-9537903-1.
- Martorell Linares, Miguel (2003). "El rey en su desconcierto. Alfonso XIII, los viejos políticos y el ocaso de la monarquía". Alfonso XIII. Un político en el trono (in Spanish) (Javier Moreno Luzón ed.). Madrid: Marcial Pons. pp. 373–402. ISBN 84-95379-59-7.
- Moreno Luzón, Javier (2009). "Alfonso XIII, 1902-1931". Restauración y Dictadura (in Spanish). Vol. 7 History of Spain directed by Josep Fontana and Ramón Villares. Barcelona: Crítica/Marcial Pons.
- — (2023). El rey patriota. Alfonso XIII y la nación (in Spanish). Barcelona: Galaxia Gutenberg. ISBN 978-84-19392-11-4.
- Morodo, Raúl (1973). "El 18 Brumario español. La Dictadura de Primo de Rivera". Triunfo (in Spanish) (572): 22–31.
- Quiroga Fernández de Soto, Alejandro (2022). Miguel Primo de Rivera. Dicatdura, populismo y nación (in Spanish). Barcelona: Crítica. ISBN 978-84-9199-461-9.
- Recio García, María Ángeles (2018). "El desastre de Annual en el Parlamento español: las Comisiones de Responsabilidades" (PDF). Guerra Colonial. Revista Digital (in Spanish) (2): 61–78. Archived from the original (PDF) on 31 December 2021.
- Rodríguez Jiménez, José Luis (1997). La extrema derecha española en el siglo XX (in Spanish). Madrid: Alianza Editorial. ISBN 84-206-2887-5.
- Tusell, Javier (2003). "Primo de Rivera. El golpe". La Aventura de la Historia (in Spanish) (59).
- Tusell, Javier; García Queipo de Llano, Genoveva (2002) [2001]. Alfonso XIII. El rey polémico (in Spanish) (2nd ed.). Madrid: Taurus. ISBN 84-306-0449-9.
- Villa García, Roberto (2023). 1923. El golpe de Estado que cambió la historia de España (in Spanish). Barcelona: Espasa. ISBN 978-84-670-7058-3.
