= Xosé Manoel Núñez Seixas =

Spanish historian

Xosé Manoel Núñez
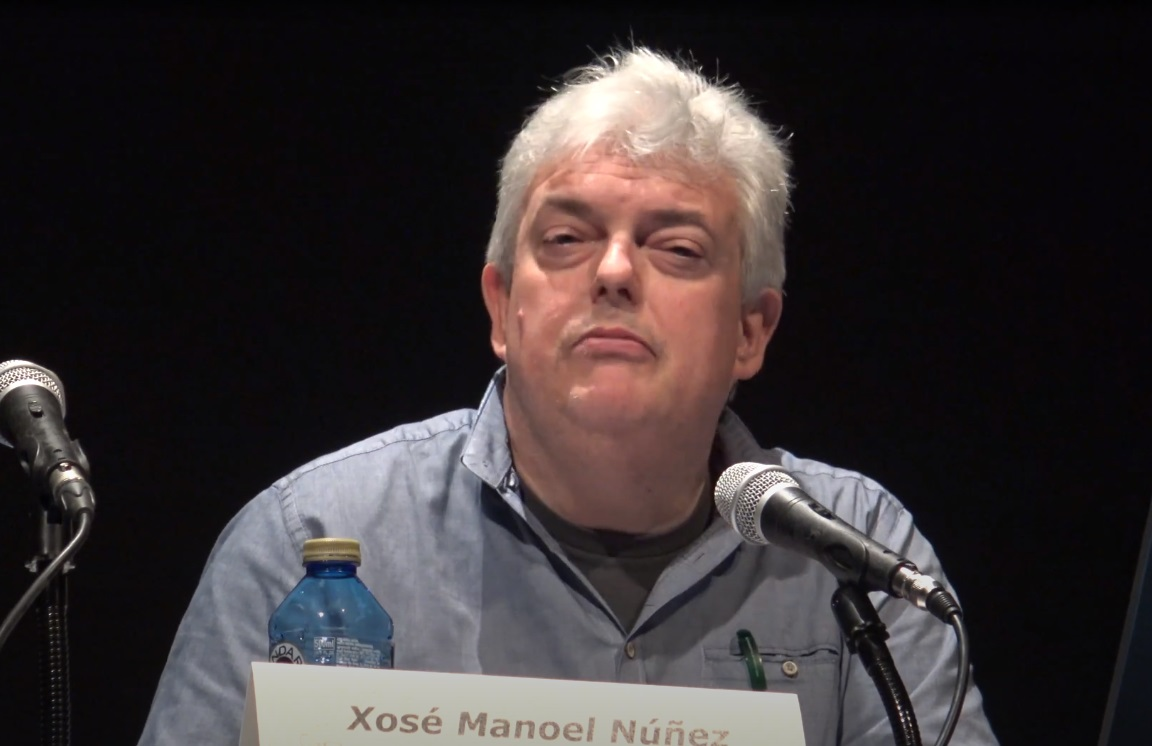
- Born: Xosé Manoel Núñez Seixas; 15 March 1966 (age 60); Ourense, Spain
- Occupations: Historian and university professor

Xosé Manoel Núñez Seixas (born 1966) is a Spanish historian who specializes in nationalism studies, the cultural history of war and violence, and migration studies.

== Biography ==
Born in Ourense, Galicia, in 1966, he studied at the University of Santiago de Compostela (USC) and at the University of Burgundy. He earned a PhD in contemporary history from the European University Institute in 1992, reading a dissertation titled El problema de las nacionalidades en la Europa de entreguerras: El Congreso de Nacionalidades Europeas (1925-1938) supervised by Heinz-Gerhard Haupt and Stuart J. Woolf. Senior lecturer at the USC since 1994, he obtained a chair of contemporary history at the USC in 2007. Following a hiatus as a full professor of Modern European History at LMU Munich from 2012 to 2017, he returned to his post at the USC. Since July 2018, he is vice-president of the Council of Galician Culture. Fluent in several European and world languages, he is also a member of the editorial board of the history journals "Studies on National Movements", Historia Social and Passato e Presente, as well as a member of the International Advisory Board of European History Quarterly, Ayer, Anuario del IEHS, Estudos Iberoamericanos, Spagna Contemporanea, "Análise Social", "Journal of Iberian and Latin American Studies", and Historia y Política, among others.

== Works ==
Author

- — (1998). Movimientos nacionalistas en Europa. Siglo XX. Madrid: Síntesis.
- — (2001). Entre Ginebra y Berlín. La cuestión de las minorías nacionales y la política internacional en Europa. 1914-1939. Madrid: Ediciones Akal.
- — (2002). O inmigrante imaxinario: estereotipos, representacións e identidades dos galegos na Arxentina (1880-1940). Santiago de Compostela: Universidade de Santiago de Compostela.
- — (2006). ¡Fuera el invasor! Nacionalismos y movilización bélica durante la guerra civil española, 1936-1939. Madrid: Marcial Pons.
- — (2007). Imperios de muerte: La guerra germano-soviética, 1941-1945. Madrid: Alianza Editorial.
- — (2010). Internacionalitzant el nacionalisme. El catalanisme polític i la qüestió de les minories nacionals a Europa (1914-1936). Catarroja & Valencia: Afers; PUV.
- — (2010). Patriotas y demócratas. El discurso nacionalista español después de Franco. Madrid: Los Libros de la Catarata.
- — (2012). La sombra del César. Santiago Montero Díaz, una biografía entre la nación y la revolución. Granada: Editorial Comares.
- — (2013). Icônes littéraires et stéréotypes sociaux. L'image des immigrants galiciens en Argentine (1800-1960). Besançon: Presses universitaires de Franche-Comté.
- — (2015). Las utopías pendientes. Una breve historia del mundo desde 1945. Barcelona: Crítica.
- — (2016). O soño da Galiza Ideal. Estudos sobre exiliados e emigrantes galegos. Vigo: Editorial Galaxia.
- — (2016). Camarada invierno: experiencia y memoria de la División Azul (1941-1945). Barcelona: Crítica.
- — (2018). El frente del Este. Historia y memoria de la guerra germano-soviética (1941-1945). Madrid: Alianza Editorial.
- — (2018). Suspiros de España. El nacionalismo español 1808-2018. Barcelona: Crítica. (Note: Awarded with the 2019 Spanish Premio Nacional de Ensayo (National Award for Essay).)
- — (2019). Patriotas transnacionales. Estudios sobre nacionalismos y transferencias culturales en la Europa del siglo XX. Madrid: Cátedra.
- Die bewegte Nation. Der spanische Nationalgedanke, 1808-2019, Hamburg: Hamburger Edition, 2019 (reprint: Bonn: Bundeszentrale für politische Bildug, 2020).
- Sites of the Dictators. Memories of Authoritarian Europe, 1945-2020, London: Routledge, 2021.
- Imperios e danzas. As Españas plurais do franquismo, Vigo: Galaxia, 2021 (English updated edition: Beyond Folklore? The Franco Regime and Ethnoterritorial Diversity in Spain, 1930-1975, London: Routledge, 2024).
- Volver a Stalingrado. El frente del este en la memoria europea, 1945-2021, Barcelona: Galaxia Gutenberg, 2022 (forthcoming English edition: The Eastern Front in European Memory. On Victims and Heroes, 1945-2024, Blondon: Bloomsbury, 2025).
- Os inmigrantes imaxinados. A identidade galega na Arxentina, 1780-1960, Vigo: Galaxia, 2024.

Editor & co-editor
Co-author

- Moreno Luzón, Javier; Núñez Seixas, Xosé Manoel (2017). Los colores de la patria. Símbolos nacionales en la España contemporánea. Madrid: Tecnos.
- Moreno Luzón, Javier; Núñez Seixas, Xosé M. (eds.). Ser españoles. Imaginarios nacionalistas en el siglo XX. Barcelona: RBA.
- Villares, Ramón; Núñez Seixas, Xosé M., eds. (2017). Os exilios ibéricos: unha ollada comparada: nos 70 anos da Fundación do Consello de Galiza. Santiago de Compostela: Consello da Cultura Galega.
- Ucelay-Da Cal, Enric; Gonzàlez Vilalta, Arnau; Núñez Seixas, Xosé Manoel, eds. (2018). El catalanisme davant del feixisme, 1919-2018. Maçanet de la Selva: Editorial Gregal.
- Núñez Seixas, Xosé M.; Storm, Eric, eds. (2019). Regionalism and Modern Europe: Identity Construction and Movements from 1890 to the Present Day. New York: Bloomsbury.
- War Veterans and the World after 1945. Cold War Politics, Decolonization. London: Routledge. 2019.
- Emotions and Everyday Nationalism in Modern Europe. London: Routledge. 2020.
- The First World War and the Nationality Question in Europe. Global Impact and Local Dynamics. Leiden/Boston: Brill. 2020.
