= Francisco Alía Miranda =

Spanish historian (born 1960)

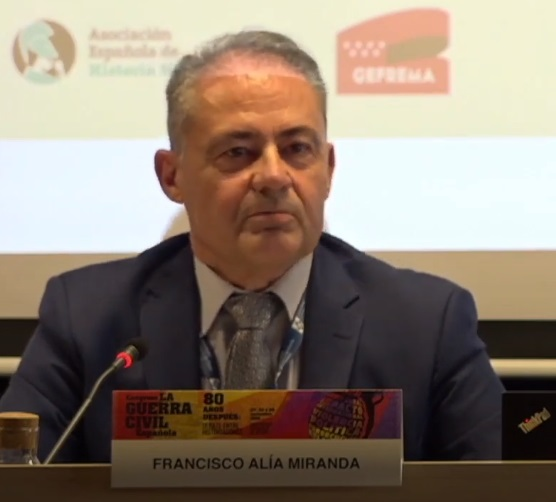
- Born: 1960 (age 65–66)

Academic background
- Education: Complutense University of Madrid

Academic work
- Discipline: history
- Institutions: University of Castilla–La Mancha
- Main interests: 20th-century Spanish history

Francisco Alía Miranda (born 1960) is a Spanish historian. He has focused on the study of 20th-century Spanish history. He has also published works dealing with the methodology of history.

A pupil of Manuel Espadas Burgos, Alía Miranda earned a PhD in Contemporary History from the Complutense University of Madrid (UCM). A senior lecturer at the University of Castilla–La Mancha (UCLM), he has been employed by the UCLM since 1988. He served as president of the Instituto de Estudios Manchegos from 2010 to 2017.

He was appointed as full professor at the UCLM in 2019.

== Works ==
Authored books

- — (2006). Duelo de sables. El general Aguilera, de ministro a conspirador contra Primo de Rivera (1917-1931). Madrid: Biblioteca Nueva.
- — (2011). Julio de 1936: Conspiración y alzamiento contra la Segunda República. Barcelona: Crítica.
- — (2015). La agonía de la República. El final de la guerra civil española (1938-1939). Barcelona: Crítica.
- — (2016). Métodos de investigación histórica. Madrid: Síntesis.
- — (2017). La Guerra Civil en Ciudad Real. Conflicto y revolución en una provincia de la retaguardia republicana, 1936-1939. Ciudad Real: Diputación Provincial de Ciudad Real.
- — (2018). Historia del Ejército español y de su intervención política: del Desastre del 98 a la Transición. Madrid: Los Libros de la Catarata.
