= Javier Moreno Luzón =

Spanish historian

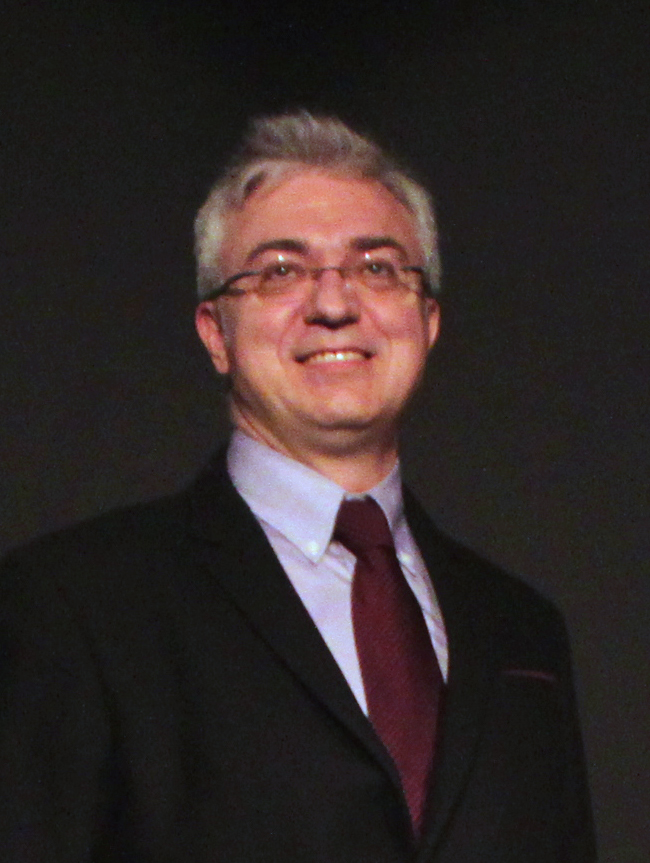
- Born: 1967 (age 58–59); Hellín, Spain

Academic background
- Education: Complutense University of Madrid
- Thesis: El conde de Romanones. Caciquismo y política de clientelas en la España de la Restauración
- Doctoral advisor: Santos Juliá

Academic work
- Discipline: history
- Institutions: Complutense University of Madrid
- Main interests: political history of Restoration Spain
- Notable works: Modernizing the Nation: Spain during the Reign of Alfonso XIII, 1902–1931

Javier Moreno Luzón (born 1967) is a Spanish historian, professor of the History of Thought and Social and Political Movements at the Complutense University of Madrid. He is an expert in the political history of Restoration Spain.

== Biography ==
Born in 1967 in Hellín, province of Albacete. He earned a PhD in history from the Complutense University of Madrid (UCM) reading a dissertation in 1996 titled El conde de Romanones. Caciquismo y política de clientelas en la España de la Restauración and supervised by Santos Juliá. He has been a scholar and researcher at the National University of Distance Education (UNED), Harvard University, the École des Hautes Études en Sciences Sociales and the London School of Economics and Political Science. He also served as deputy director of the Centro de Estudios Políticos y Constitucionales (CEPC). A senior lecturer at the UCM since 1997, Moreno Luzón was appointed to a Chair of History of Thought and Social and Political Movements in 2012.

== Works ==
Author

- — (1998). Romanones. Caciquismo y política liberal. Madrid: Alianza Editorial.
- — (2012). Modernizing the Nation: Spain during the Reign of Alfonso XIII, 1902–1931. Brighton: Sussex Academic Press.

Coauthor

- González Calleja, Eduardo; Moreno Luzón, Javier (1993). Elecciones y parlamentarios: dos siglos de historia en Castilla-La Mancha. Toledo: Servicio de Publicaciones de la Junta de Castilla-La Mancha.
- Moreno Luzón, Javier; Villares, Ramón. Restauración y dictadura. Barcelona–Madrid: Crítica/Marcial Pons.
- Moreno Luzón, Javier; Núñez Seixas, Xosé M. (2017). Los colores de la patria. Símbolos nacionales en la España contemporánea. Madrid: Tecnos.

Coordinator/editor

- Moreno Luzón, Javier, ed. (2003). Alfonso XIII. Un político en el trono. Madrid: Marcial Pons.
- Álvarez Junco, José; Moreno Luzón, Javier, eds. (2006). La Constitución de Cádiz: Historiografía y conmemoración. Homenaje a Francisco Tomás y Valiente. Madrid: Centro de Estudios Políticos y Constitucionales.
- Moreno Luzón, Javier, ed. (2007). Construir España: nacionalismo español y procesos de nacionalización. Centro de Estudios Políticos y Constitucionales.
- Moreno Luzón, Javier, ed. (2011). J. Moreno Luzón (ed.), Izquierdas y nacionalismos en la España contemporánea. Madrid: Fundación Pablo Iglesias.
- Moreno Luzón, Javier; Núñez Seixas, Xosé M., eds. (2013). Ser españoles. Imaginarios nacionalistas en el siglo XX. Barcelona: RBA.
- Moreno Luzón, Javier; Rey, Fernando del, eds. (2013). Pueblo y nación. Homenaje a José Álvarez Junco. Madrid: Taurus.
- Moreno Luzón, Javier; Martínez López, Fernando, eds. (2013). Reformismo liberal: La Institución Libre de Enseñanza y la política española. La Institución Libre de Enseñanza y Francisco Giner de los Ríos: nuevas perspectivas. Vol. I. Madrid: Fundación Francisco Giner de los Ríos/Institución Libre de Enseñanza/Acción Cultural Española.
- Moreno Luzón, Javier; Tavares de Almeida, Pedro, eds. (2015). De las urnas al hemiciclo. Elecciones y parlamentarismo en la Península Ibérica (1875-1926). Madrid: Marcial Pons Historia.
