= Municipal Statute of 1924 (Spain) =

Act passed by the Spanish government

The Municipal Statute of 1924 (in Spanish: Estatuto Municipal de 1924) was the regulation of municipalities in Spain promulgated by the Dictatorship of Primo de Rivera on March 8, 1924. The statute was intended to “regenerate” municipal life, in order to “dismantle the caciquism”, but it was not applied because the promised elections were never held. The councilors and mayors were appointed by the civil governors and, in turn, appointed by the Military Directory, thus turning them into an appendix of the Patriotic Union, the single party of the Dictatorship.

== Background ==
Primo de Rivera considered himself the “iron surgeon” who was to achieve the “dismantling of the caciquismo” that Joaquín Costa had spoken about at the beginning of the century, as was already reflected in the regenerationist rhetoric used in the Manifesto with which he justified the coup d'état.

After the declaration of the state of war, Primo de Rivera replaced the provincial and local authorities (civil governors, mayors, and presidents of the deputations) with military personnel, although starting in April 1924, the civil governors were progressively replaced by civilian personnel. However, some of its most important functions, such as censorship or public order, remained in the hands of military authorities.

To assist the governors, governmental delegates, as well as the military, were appointed in each judicial district, one of whose functions was to put an end to corruption. More than 800 local corporations were investigated, and more than 100 files were opened for having irregularities detected in them. 152 local government secretaries were dismissed. Article 1 of the Royal Decree of October 20, 1923, which created them, stated:

For each head of judicial district, and as delegates of the civil governors of the provinces, a chief or captain of the Army will be appointed, who will inform them of the functional deficiencies of the local governments that constitute the corresponding judicial district, proposing the appropriate remedies and promoting the currents of the new civic life in the towns.

The 9254 local governments that existed in Spain then, dissolved by the Royal Decree of September 30, 1923, were initially replaced by a Board of Associated Members, established in the Municipal Law of October 2, 1887, which were made up of the various categories of taxpayers chosen by lot. Later, on January 1, 1924, the government delegates received the order to replace the Boards of Associated Members with new corporations made up of “persons of high social prestige, of proven solvency and, if possible, with professional qualifications, or, failing that, major taxpayers”.

Primo de Rivera then entrusted the task of reforming the legal-administrative system that would govern the new local governments to the young lawyer José Calvo Sotelo, a conservative politician coming from Maurism, who was put at the head of the General Directorate of Local Administration. Calvo Sotelo appointed a team of ex-Maurists and right-wing Catholics, such as José María Gil Robles, Count Vallellano, Josep Pi i Suñer, Miquel Vidal i Guardiola and Luis Jordana de Pozas, who collaborated with him in the elaboration of the Municipal Statute of 1924 and the Provincial Statute of 1925. Later, he called in a new collaborator, Andrés Amado, who would end up becoming Calvo Sotelo's right-hand man.

However, most of the text of the Statute (including the long exposition of motives) was drafted by Calvo Sotelo. According to his biographer Alfonso Bullón de Mendoza, it was the “great work of Calvo Sotelo”, “which alone would justify the inclusion of its author's name within the Contemporary History of Spain”. Gil Robles was in charge of the electoral part. The part dedicated to the Treasury, which was very extensive, was the work of the economist Antonio Flores de Lemus, who updated the basic project of Augusto Gonzalez Besada. They worked very fast and, in a month and a half, they had finished the project.

== The Statute ==
The new municipal code was given the name of Statute after Calvo Sotelo himself hesitated over its name, given that it was to be neither debated nor approved by a Cortes, which remained closed, but by the Military Directory (which devoted three sessions to it): “Law, it was not; decree-law did not please me; local Regulation, as someone proposed, seemed to me to dwarf its rank; and in the end, I opted to call it Statute, an eclectic qualifier, which did not declare the origin of the legal body and dressed it in the garb of supreme efficiency. It was a word discovery because it was subsequently applied to many other legal texts”.

According to Alfonso Bullón de Mendoza, what Calvo Sotelo intended to achieve with the Statute “was nothing more and nothing less than the regeneration of the political life of Spain, the old aspiration of Joaquín Costa and the street maurismo”. When it was approved by the Directory, Calvo Sotelo wrote a letter to Antonio Maura in which he said: “Your project of 1918 is the sap and nerve of the new regime. God willing, it will bear fruit, for the good of the country and the honor of those who, like you, knew how to see the evil and its remedy since ancient times”. Calvo Sotelo was referring to the caciquismo, and, to try to put an end to it, the Statute contained a long list of regulations to ensure the secrecy of the vote (booths, envelopes for the ballots instead of handing them to the president of the voting table, etc.) and thus avoid electoral fraud, so widespread during the Restoration. As a result, the single-member district system was abandoned, and the majority electoral system was replaced by the proportional representation system.

The preamble of the Statute, promulgated on April 8, 1924, and dated March 8, declared that “the State, in order to be democratic, must be supported by free municipalities”. It affirmed the autonomy of municipalities, granting them the right to establish their own governance and maintain economic independence from the central government. The articles established the democratic election by universal suffrage of two-thirds of the councilors. Males over 23 years of age could vote — lowering the previous voting age by two years — and female heads of household (i.e. widows and emancipated single women), thus leaving out married women, so that, according to Alfonso Bullón de Mendoza, “women could not have full electoral rights”. Localities with fewer than 500 inhabitants would operate under an open council regime. In towns with populations between 500 and 1,000, half of the eligible voters would serve as councilors every three years. For this, the electorate would be divided into four equal groups based on surname order, starting with the letter A. Mayors were to be elected by the councilors, rather than appointed by the government, as had been suggested in other proposals, particularly for large cities with populations over 150,000. Additionally, the creation of a corps of municipal secretaries was envisioned. The municipalities would have full autonomy to develop urban planning, infrastructure, and service policies, and the State would cede certain taxes and excise duties to them. The Statute also provided detailed regulations on municipal credit and the use of extraordinary budgets.

=== Composition of local governments ===
The local governments are composed of the mayor, deputy mayors, and councilors. The number of councilors is established for each municipality according to its population:

- In municipalities with a population of up to 500 inhabitants, all electors will be councilors, functioning in an open council.
- In municipalities between 500 and 1000 inhabitants, half of the electors shall be councilors; for this purpose, the electors are divided alphabetically by surname into four groups. The electors of each group will be councilors for six years, and every three years the group of councilors who have been councilors for six years is replaced by a new group.
- In municipalities with more than 1000 inhabitants, the number of councilmen varied between 8 and 48, depending on the population. Part of the councilmen are elected by the electing neighbors, and another part (of the order of 1/3) by the existing corporations in the municipality. Every three years, half of the councilors are renewed. The candidates are presented in lists that cannot have more names than the vacant councillorships.

Once the local government is constituted, the mayor and the deputy mayors are elected.

=== Serious limitations to the democratic nature of the Statute ===
The Statute began with an extensive explanation of motives written by Calvo Sotelo, which, as he confessed at the beginning of 1931, was a “true profession of faith in democratic ideals which, in my opinion — which I have not rectified —, are served in the Statute as the most ambitious of Spanish democrats could never have imagined”. Among the “democratic ideals” highlighted in the Statute, Calvo Sotelo emphasized “the admission of women to the exercise of suffrage”. He called this, "perhaps the most interesting and transcendental" innovation of the Statute, adding, "Of course, municipal administration will greatly benefit from their collaboration." However, his conservative view of women is evident when he refers to this "collaboration" by stating that “in the areas of markets, education, and the multiple facets of charity—such as casas de socorro and asylums — women will find a field in which to develop particularly adapted to their temperament and condition”. This conservative conception is also reflected in the fact that the vote is only granted to “Spanish women over twenty-three years of age who are not subject to parental authority, marital authority or guardianship, and are neighbors, with an open house in some municipal district” (art. 51). As a result, married women—who were largely under the authority of their husbands at the time—were excluded from voting. This exclusion was based on the principle of legal inferiority, which accepted women’s subordination within marriage. Calvo Sotelo justified granting suffrage to women by arguing that "the female head of the family" deserved to vote, as their exclusion from the Census, which included the illiterate, was “a real ludibrium.” Calvo Sotelo estimated that around one to one and a half million women would gain the right to vote.

Despite the Statute’s purported democratic ideals, its vision of democracy was tempered by a particular view of the municipality as an entity that existed before and beyond the law. As stated in the preamble, “The Municipality is not the child of the legislator: it is a social fact of coexistence, prior to the State, and also prior to and superior to the law. The law must therefore recognize and protect it as an adjective function.” This view shaped the Statute’s approach to democracy, which was framed as complementary to management efficiency. The preamble argued that “the forms of Government by Commission and Government by Manager represent the maximum advance in reconciling democracy with efficiency [...] any Municipality is a business, the best business for the people if it receives good administration, and its management should therefore not differ from private businesses in commercial terms. The increase in the powers of the Commission or the Manager is balanced by a parallel increase in the rights of the neighborhood, merging the maximum criterion of authority with the supreme degree of democracy in the same formula." This idea led to the possibility that municipalities with populations over 50,000 could be governed by a manager elected by the councilors. This arrangement effectively placed the administration in the hands of a technician, prioritizing efficiency over political representation.

The democratic character of the municipalities was limited above all by the fact that only two-thirds of the councilmen were elected by universal suffrage, and the remaining third by the “corporations” (arts. 43 and 46). This was justified in the preamble: “The Municipalities, however, are not a simple sum of individuals: in them also live and breathe Corporations, Associations, in a word, collective juridical persons. If suffrage is to be a faithful reflection of the reality of a people, the local government must be attended not only by those who represent the individuals but also by those who represent the entities. This is the reason for the creation of the Corporate Councilors, which Maura and Canalejas had already proposed in their respective projects. Both of them granted half of the council seats to the corporate representation in each local government; we granted it only a third part, wishing to proceed with prudent criteria”. Bullón de Mendoza, who recognizes that corporate representation “from today's perspective would have a clearly reactionary significance”, justifies Calvo Sotelo by saying that “it responded to an idea then very much in vogue”.

However, there were other serious limitations to the democratization of municipalities. One was the separation between the permanent municipal commission, composed of the mayor and the deputy mayors, and the plenary, in order to avoid “parliamentary excesses”. The plenary would only meet “every year in three four-monthly periods of a maximum of ten sessions each”. Another was that “the renewal of one or the other Councilors shall be by halves every three years”. A third limitation was that the councilors did not receive any type of remuneration, nor did the mayors, except for representation expenses in large municipalities. A fourth limitation was that the local governments were “forbidden to deal with political affairs of the State”.

== Application ==
Calvo Sotelo deployed an extensive propaganda campaign to disseminate the Statute. To this end, he held dozens of conferences and nearly a hundred public events all over Spain, in which he was usually accompanied by Luis Jordana de Pozas, the person in charge of drawing up the propaganda plan. One of the most crowded was the one that took place in the Orense bullring, where a minute of silence for the prosperity of Spain was observed. In the meeting held in the Rosalía de Castro Theater (La Coruña), he affirmed that the Municipal Statute was “the most liberal and democratic in the world”, and he ended by saying: "The Army, which had seized the Government with the broom and not with the sword, would not abandon it until its mission was accomplished; but that in the work of the Government there was room for the cooperation of the right and the left, with the condition of a healthy spirit of citizenship being sufficient”. The propaganda campaign was extended outside Spain and for the First International Congress of Cities, which took place in Paris in 1925 and was attended by Luis Jordana (whose presence in the representation of the Spanish Dictatorship was not very well received by the organizers). A brochure was prepared in French on municipal autonomy, which was distributed among the attendees. The brochure was written by Jordana, Calvo Sotelo, and Gil Robles. After participating in the Paris Congress, the Count of Vallellano, then Mayor of Madrid, founded the Union of Spanish Municipalities, to which many municipalities adhered, and which held its first Municipalist Congress in 1925.

The new financing system was immediately applied, and, according to historian Eduardo González Calleja, the result was that the municipalities had “greater ordinary and extraordinary resources” with which “they were able to execute public works and improve the indispensable services (education and health) to provide a minimum standard of living and consumption to the neighbors”. However, this increase in municipal spending — that went from representing 14% of the total expenditure of the Public Administrations in 1924 to 15.8% in 1926 — also meant an increase in municipal debt, that went from 792 million in 1923 to 1,388 million in 1929.

The recognition of the financial autonomy of the municipalities clashed with the Diputación Foral de Navarra, which sent a delegation to Madrid that met with Calvo Sotelo, Primo de Rivera, and the King to warn them that the Ley Paccionada of 1841 foresaw the direct intervention of the Diputación Foral in the economic administration of the municipalities of Navarre. The Dictatorship gave in immediately. In a Royal Order of April 11, 1924, it was recognized that the Municipal Statute would be applied in Navarre only in “that which did not oppose the regime established by the Law of August 16, 1841”, and it also granted the Diputación Foral the power to “dictate the necessary rules to harmonize its private regime with the autonomy that the Statute granted to all the local governments of the Nation”.

The promised democratization of the local governments did not take place, because the elections were never held. Throughout the Dictatorship, the councilors and mayors were appointed by the civil governors, in turn, appointed by the government, “with the undeclared aim of having monolithic corporations of the Patriotic Union”, according to Eduardo González Calleja.

== Bibliography ==
- PRESIDENCIA DEL DIRECTORIO MILITAR (1924). "Estatuto municipal, de 8 de marzo de 1924" [Municipal Statute of March 8, 1924] (PDF). Gaceta de Madrid: 1218–1302.
- Ben-Ami, Shlomo (2012). El cirujano de hierro. La dictadura de Primo de Rivera (1923-1930) [The Iron Surgeon. The Dictatorship of Primo de Rivera (1923-1930)]. Barcelona: RBA. ISBN 978-84-9006-161-9.
- González Calleja, Eduardo (2005). La España de Primo de Rivera. La modernización autoritaria 1923-1930 [The Spain of Primo de Rivera. Authoritarian modernization 1923-1930]. Madrid: Alianza Editorial. ISBN 84-206-4724-1.
- Bullón de Mendoza, Alfonso (2004). José Calvo Sotelo. Barcelona: Ariel. ISBN 84-344-6718-6.
- García Queipo de Llano, Genoveva (1997). El reinado de Alfonso XIII. La modernización fallida [The reign of Alfonso XIII. The failed modernization]. Madrid: Historia 16. ISBN 84-7679-318-9.
