= Military directorate of Miguel Primo de Rivera =

Kingdom of Spain government 1923 to 1925

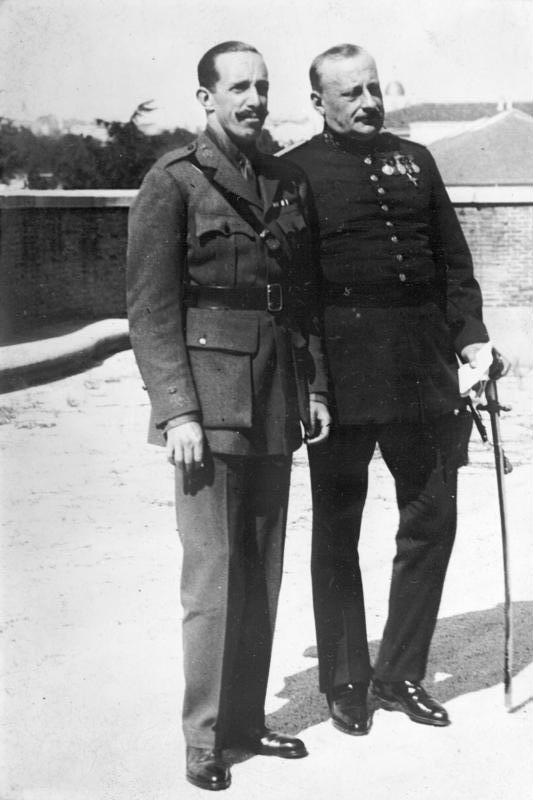
Alfonso XIII with General Miguel Primo de Rivera after his appointment as Head of Government and President of the Military Directory.

The military directorate of Miguel Primo de Rivera, also referred to as the Military Directory (Spanish: Directorio Militar), constituted the first stage of the personal dictatorship established in Spain during the reign of Alfonso XIII after the triumph of Primo de Rivera's coup d'état of September 13–15, 1923. It was an institution made up exclusively of military officers (eight generals and a rear admiral) who, under the presidency of General Miguel Primo de Rivera, had to advise him in the functions of government and in the promulgation of the decrees which would have the force of law —the Cortes elected in April 1923 were closed—. In December 1925, the directorate was substituted by a government in which there were military and civilians also presided by Primo de Rivera, which would be known as the Civil Directory, which constituted the second and last stage of the primorriverist dictatorship, ending in January 1930.

The regime of the Military Directory, like other corporatist military regimes established in Eastern and Southern Europe in the interwar period, differed from fascism —established in Italy after the march on Rome in October 1922— in that it was a single-party system but under the tutelage of the government and that the state apparatus remained controlled by the old ruling classes that allowed only limited changes. However, according to historian Eduardo González Calleja, "the primorriverist dictatorship also had some similarities with fascism", such as corporatism.

During this first stage, the dictatorship achieved two great successes: the solution of the Morocco problem (including the issue of the responsibilities that were shelved) and the reestablishment of public order in Catalonia (two issues on which the "old politics" of the parties of that time had been defeated). Once these two problems were solved, the "dictatorship with a king", as the historian Santos Juliá has denominated it, considered its continuity with the foundation of a new political regime, with an authoritarian type, based on a "single party" —the Patriotic Union— in the style of Fascist Italy.

== Background ==
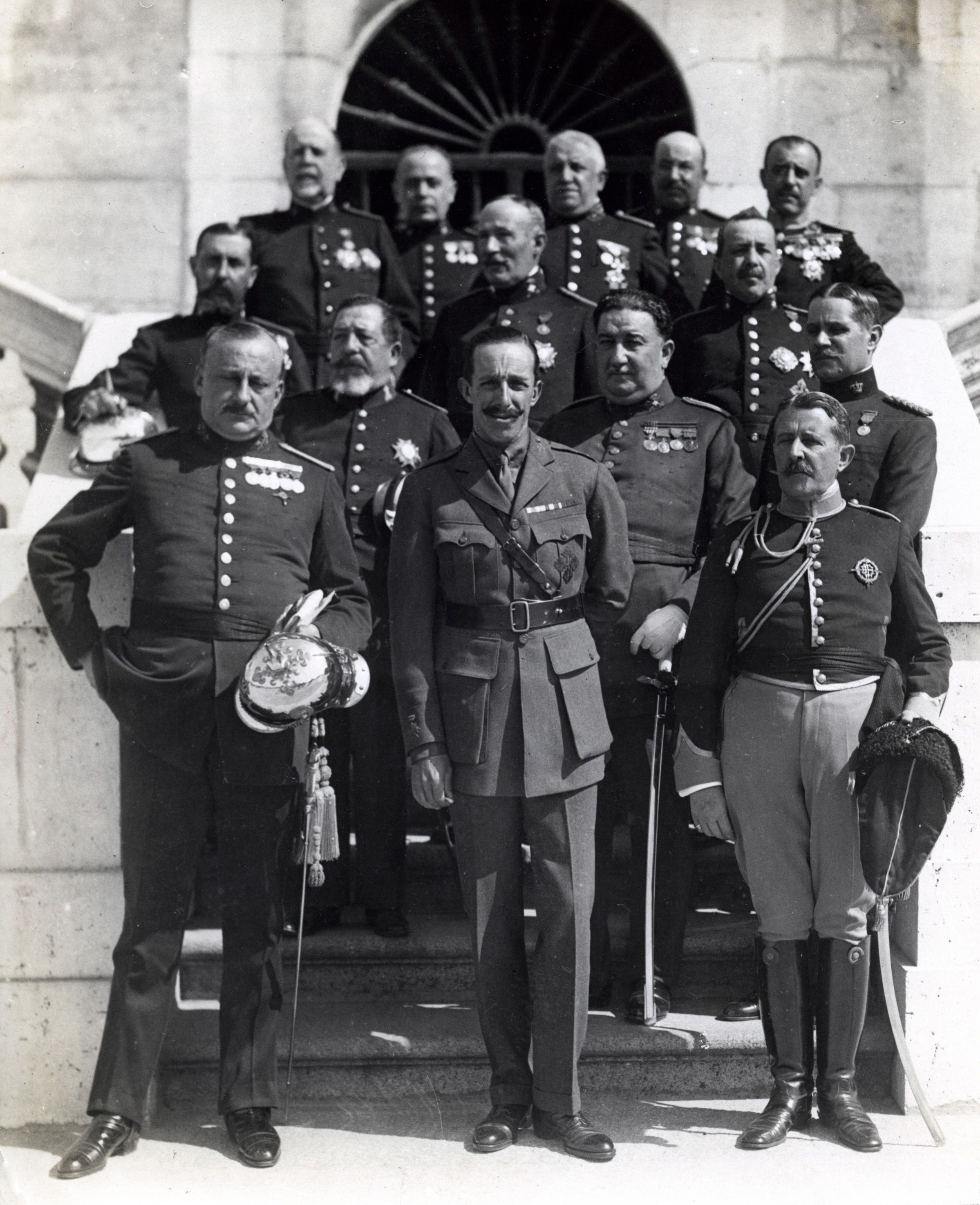
From left to right (in bold, the generals members of the Directorio Militar. In brackets, the number of the military region they represent; in italics, the four generals members of the Quadrilateral): General Primo de Rivera, King Alfonso XIII, and General José Cavalcanti de Alburquerque, in the first row; General Antonio Mayandía Gómez (5th), General Federico Berenguer Fusté and General Leopoldo Saro Marín, in the second row; General Antonio Dabán Vallejo, General Francisco Ruiz del Portal (7th) and General Luis Navarro y Alonso de Celada (3rd), in the third row; General Luis Hermosa y Kith (2nd), General Dalmiro Rodríguez Pedré (4th), General Adolfo Vallespinosa Vior (1st), General Francisco Gómez-Jordana Sousa (6th), and General Mario Muslera y Planes (8th), in the last row.

Since the disaster of 98, there was a growing interference of the Army in the political affairs of Spain. Two key moments of this praetorian attitude of the Army were the Cu-Cut! crisis of 1905 —the assault by officers of the Barcelona garrison on the editorial office and workshops of this nationalist satirical publication in response to a cartoon about the Army— which led to the Law of Jurisdictions of 1906, and the Spanish crisis of 1917, in which the self-proclaimed Defence Juntas (Spanish: Juntas de Defensa) Boards, made up exclusively of military personnel, took on a special role. The culmination of this process was Primo de Rivera's coup d'état on September 13, 1923, that was, according to historian Eduardo González Calleja, "the first corporate intervention of the Armed Forces" that, unlike the proclamation of the 19th century, created "the first authentic praetorian regime in our history —the Directorio Militar—, transferring the values and attitudes of the Army to public life as a whole".

When Primo de Rivera and King Alfonso XIII met on September 15, 1923, at the Palacio de Oriente, they agreed on a formula that kept the appearance of constitutional legality. Primo de Rivera would be appointed "Head of the Government" and "sole minister", assisted by a military directorate, formed by eight brigadier generals, one representing each military region, and a counter admiral, Antonio Magaz y Pers, Marquis of Magaz, representing the Navy.

The Gaceta de Madrid of the following day published the Royal Decree, signed by the King and countersigned by the Minister of Grace and Justice Antonio López Muñoz, again to keep the appearance of legality, which stated: "I am appointing as head of the Government Lieutenant General Miguel Primo de Rivera y Orbaneja, Marquis of Estella". In the same issue of the Gaceta de Madrid of September 16 appeared the first royal decree which Primo de Rivera had presented to the King for his signature, creating the Military Directory presided over by him and that would have "all the faculties, initiatives and responsibilities inherent to a Government as a whole, but with a single signature" and that proposed to "constitute a brief parenthesis in the constitutional march of Spain". In its Exposition, published in the press under the headline A historic decree, it was declared:

Sir: Appointed by Your Majesty with the task of forming a Government in difficult times for the country, which I have contributed to provoke, inspired by the highest patriotic feelings, it would be cowardly desertion to hesitate in accepting the position that carries with so many responsibilities and obliges to so much fatiguing and incessant work. But Your Majesty knows well that neither I, nor the people who have propagated and proclaimed the new regime with me, believe ourselves qualified for the concrete performance of the ministerial offices, and that it was and still is our purpose to constitute a brief parenthesis in the constitutional progress of Spain, to establish it as soon as the country offers us men not infected with the vices that we impute to the political organizations, so that we can offer them to Your Majesty so that normality is soon reestablished. For this reason I allow myself to offer to Your Majesty the formation of a military directorate, presided over by myself, which, without the allocation of offices or categories of ministers, will have all the faculties, initiatives and responsibilities inherent to a Government as a whole, but with a single signature, which I will submit to Your Majesty; for that reason I must be the only one who, before Your Majesty and the major notary of the Kingdom, and with all the unction and patriotism that the solemn act requires, kneels before the Holy Gospels, swearing allegiance to the Country and to the King and to the purpose of re-establishing the rule of the Constitution as soon as Your Majesty accepts the Government that I propose to you. Under this aspect, Sirs, the country has received us with a clamorous welcome and comfortable hope; and we believe it is an elementary duty to modify the essence of our action, that cannot have any other justification before History and the Country than disinterestedness and patriotism. Madrid, September 15, 1923.

— Exposition, Mr.: A.L.R.P. of V.M. Miguel Primo de Rivera.

Article 1 of the Royal Decree conferred on Primo de Rivera the position of "President of the Military Directory in charge of the Government of the State, with powers to propose to me as many decrees as may be convenient for public health, which shall have the force of law". Article 2 established that the Directory would be formed by its president and eight brigadier generals, one for each military region, plus a counter admiral of the Navy. Article 3 stated that the President of the Directory would be the one to sign the decrees, "with the faculties of sole Minister", and "with the prior advice of the Directory". In the 4th, the positions of President of the Council of Ministers, Ministers of the Crown and Undersecretaries were suppressed, except for the Undersecretaries of State and War.

On the 17th day, the Gaceta de Madrid published the dissolution of the Congress of Deputies and of the elective part of the Senate, in accordance with the power conferred on the King by Article 32 of the Constitution, although with the obligation to convene them again within three months. On November 12, once the term had passed, the presidents of the Congress and the Senate, Melquiades Álvarez and the Count of Romanones, respectively, presented themselves before the king so that he would convene the Courts, reminding him that this was his duty as constitutional monarch. The response they received was their immediate dismissal from the two positions they held. Primo de Rivera justified it with these words:

The country is no longer impressed with movies of liberal and democratic essences; it wants order, work and economy.

On December 21, 1923, the first reorganization of the Directory was carried out, becoming a collegiate structure, and therefore the generals who were part of it could assume the responsibility of a ministerial office, which until then had corresponded to Primo de Rivera, as "sole minister". The post of Undersecretary, previously held only by General Severiano Martínez Anido in the Ministry of the Interior, was also reestablished, with the power to participate in the meetings of the Directory. A new step towards the conversion of the Directory into a de facto government was taken in June 1924 when the members of the Directory could sign the decrees delivered to the king for his approval —a power which until then had corresponded exclusively to Primo de Rivera—.

== Permanent state of emergency and reestablishment of "social peace" ==
=== Militarization of public order ===
The reestablishment of "order", considered by the rebels to have been broken, was the most immediate objective. The expeditious method used was to place this task in the hand of the Army, which enjoyed, according to Eduardo González Calleja, "an omnipotent power, uncontrolled by any assembly, free of the political responsibility required of a parliamentary government, and empowered to the point of arbitrariness because of the suspension of the Constitution and the virtual disappearance of the norms inherent to public liberties". In this way, González Calleja concludes, the dictatorship transformed "Spanish public life into a permanent state of exception".

After the declaration of a state of war throughout Spain, which lasted until the end of the Military Directory in December 1925, the next measure dictated by Primo de Rivera for the militarization of "public order" was the replacement of provincial and local authorities (civil governors, mayors, presidents of the deputations) with military personnel— from April 1924 the provincial governors would be progressively replaced by civilian personnel, although some of their most important functions, such as censorship or public order, remained in the hands of military authorities—. Afterwards, "political crimes" (including the display of non-national flags or the use of non-Spanish languages in official acts) and a good part of common crimes such as armed robbery in stores and banks, the handling of explosives and those of treason and lèse majesté were attributed to military jurisdiction.

Those in charge of applying the policy of "public order" were the two people most responsible for it during the darkest years of the pistolerismo in Barcelona: the former civil governor, General Severiano Martínez Anido, appointed undersecretary of the Ministry of the Interior; and the former chief of police, General Miguel Arlegui, who occupied the reestablished General Directorate of Security, on which the Surveillance and Security Corps depended. On the other hand, the Civil Guard recovered its traditional autonomy, and the civil governors had no command over it.

The declaration of the state of war and the rest of the measures to militarize public order and restrict rights and liberties managed to reduce the number of attacks —between 1923 and 1928 there were 51 attacks, compared to 1,259 in 1919-1923— and the number of strikes was reduced, although this was also due to the economic growth experienced in the "roaring twenties".

=== Somatén ===
Another of the decisions of the Directory that also had to do with public order, and one of the first it agreed upon, was a royal decree of September 17, which extended the Catalan institution of the Somatén to all the provinces of Spain. According to the Royal Decree, the Somatén Nacional, the official name it received, would be recruited within a month by the captains general, under the command of a Brigadier General. In the Decree, Primo de Rivera explained that the Somatén was not only an auxiliary force for the maintenance of public order but also a "spur of the spirits" to stimulate citizen collaboration with the new regime. In spite of the fact that Primo de Rivera in a speech pronounced before Mussolini on November 21, 1923, pretended to equate it with the Fascist "blackshirts", the somatén "was an armed corps of bourgeois of order, created from, by and for the power", although workers from the Free Trade Unions were also integrated into it. As Primo de Rivera said, the Somatén "has as its motto 'peace, justice and order', the three principles of true democracy".

In order to stimulate the enlistment of men over 23 years of age and to encourage social support for the institution, countless civic events were organized, all following the same ritual. The Somatén had a notable role in the police of good manners, taking care of establishing a certain conservative bourgeois civic behavior, with a strong religious component. In practice, it is possible to differentiate between the rural Somatén, aimed at the repression of common crimes, such as theft, and the urban Somatén, which acted under the tutelage of the Army and the Police in the repression of so-called "social crimes", such as strikes. However, the Somatén progressively became "a simple choreographic adornment of the regime's pomp and ceremony, parading with its badges, weapons and flags in every celebration or official commemoration that required its presence", states González Calleja.

=== Restriction of rights and freedom: censorship ===
With the Constitution of 1876 suspended, the guarantees of rights and liberties were left without effect. One of the most closely controlled was freedom of expression. On the very day of the appointment of the directorate, September 15, 1923, the strictest press censorship was established. According to Eduardo González Calleja, "almost any criticism of the government, its men or its institutions was forbidden; the allusion to any persecutory measure unleashed by the dictatorship against its presumed enemies; the apology of any regionalist tendency; the news of the declaration of strikes and their development, of disturbances of public order, robberies, crimes, scandals, pornography or blackmail; the commentary on the problems of subsistence, fuel or communications; the detailed information of the war councils or military issues concerning Morocco or Tangier; the attacks, jokes, ironies or caricatures on foreign persons or governments; the insertion of articles on the situation in Russia (on the other hand, fascism enjoyed an understandable favorable treatment) or the commentary on news about the League of Nations contrary to Spanish interests". The sanctions for those who violated these rules could range from a fine of 250 pesetas to the suspension of the publication. Numerous newspapers were subject to fines or suspensions, especially Heraldo de Madrid, "the newspaper most persecuted by the regime", and blank spaces appeared on its pages or black stripes eliminating entire paragraphs. In this way, newspapers ceased to be organs of opinion. A proof of the impact of censorship is the fact that the 41 newspapers published in Madrid in 1920 were reduced to 16 in the last year of the dictatorship.

In 1924, the control of newspapers was centralized in the Office of Information and Censorship, presided initially by Colonel Pedro Rico Parada, who became the director of the newspaper La Nación, the organ of the Patriotic Union, a year later by Lieutenant Colonel Eduardo López Vidal, who wrote articles under the pseudonym of Celedonio de la Iglesia.

Another of the rights that was seriously limited was the freedom of assembly since a state of war had been declared. In addition, the government could transfer judges and judicial officials, thereby rendering ineffective the division of powers and the independence of the judiciary, with the consequent defenselessness of individuals and legal entities against the acts of the Administration.

=== Repression of anarcho-unionism ===
A few days after the coup d'état was consummated, the new Military Directory defined its policy with regard to workers' organizations: "Workers' associations, yes, for purposes of culture, protection and mutualism, and even of healthy politics, but not of resistance and struggle with production". The application of this principle explains to a great extent the different treatment received by the anarcho-syndicalist CNT and the socialist UGT. Primo de Rivera tried to attract the socialists, provoking a division within them between those in favor of collaboration with the dictatorship, led by Julián Besteiro, Francisco Largo Caballero and Manuel Llaneza, and those against, led by Indalecio Prieto and Fernando de los Ríos. The position of the first group won and the socialists were integrated into the Labor Council as a result of the absorption by this new body of the Institute of Social Reforms, and even Largo Caballero was part of the Council of State, which caused Prieto's resignation from the PSOE executive. On the other hand, the dictatorship's policy towards the CNT was one of implacable repression.

The first measures taken by the directorate were aimed at controlling the Sindicatos Únicos of the CNT, dominant in Catalonia, by demanding that they present their statutes, registers and accounting books, which also served as an alibi to close down their headquarters and imprison and exile their leaders without trial, the military authorities making use of the powers conferred on them by the declaration of the state of war. Faced with this pressure, many workers' organizations, such as the local Barcelona Federation of the CNT, opted to go underground. In Seville, Pedro Vallina and several other members of the CNT National Committee, which had moved to that Andalusian city in August 1923, were arrested and exiled. One of the consequences of the "virtual clandestinity in which the CNT leadership was plunged" was its radicalization.

In May 1924, taking advantage of the opportunity provided by the assassination of the executioner of Barcelona on May 7, the dictatorship banned the Sindicatos Únicos —and the CNT newspaper Solidaridad Obrera was closed—, which meant the collapse of the CNT, especially in Catalonia since it was very weakened there due to the action of the Sindicatos Libres, the brutal repression, the pistolerismo and the internal struggles of the "years of lead" (1919-1923). The following month, June 1924, the new CNT National Committee established in Zaragoza was arrested, "which permanently prevented the regular functioning of the union on a national scale".

== "Dismantling of the caciquismo" ==
Primo de Rivera considered himself the "iron surgeon" who had to achieve the "dismantling of the caciquismo" that Joaquín Costa had talked about at the beginning of the century. As González Calleja has pointed out, the regenerationist rhetoric impregnated the Manifesto used by Primo de Rivera to justify the coup d'état and a few days later declared to the press:

Let's see what nine men of good will, working intensely for nine or ten hours a day, can do in the space of ninety days.

Along with the reestablishment of "social peace", the other major objective assigned to the new provincial and local military authorities was to "regenerate" public life by dismantling the cacique networks, once the "oligarchy" of the politicians of the day had already been dislodged from power —in addition, a special Military group was created to elucidate the alleged irregularities committed by deputies and senators in the last five years—. The new civil governors, all of them militaries, were in charge of investigating cases of corruption, admitting anonymously complaints, and to assist the governors, government delegates, also militaries, were appointed in each judicial district —more than eight hundred local corporations were investigated and more than one hundred files were opened for having detected irregularities in them; 152 town hall secretaries were dismissed—.

=== Government delegates ===
The new figure of the government delegate was created by a Royal Decree of October 20, 1923, article 1 of which stated:

For each head of judicial district, and as delegates of the civil governors of the provinces, a chief or captain of the Army will be designated, who will inform them of the functional deficiencies of the City Councils that constitute the corresponding judicial district, proposing the appropriate remedies and promoting the new currents of civic life in the towns.

However, in practice, the measure of appointing government delegates was "not very effective" because among them "there were also cases of corruption" "and some even became real chieftains". They were even criticized by the politicians of the dictatorship themselves, such as José Calvo Sotelo, who noted that they often turned their demarcations into kingdoms of taifas, an exempt territory that they ruled at will, to the detriment of the authority of the civil governor, especially when the one in charge was a civilian. The Republican Eduardo Ortega y Gasset went even further when he declared that Spain was thus subjugated to a regime similar to that of the African protectorate, since the mission of the government delegates was no different from that of the administrators of the Moroccan cabala. They were also criticized by the local authorities, among other reasons, because part of their salary, lodging and representation expenses were paid by the municipal coffers and because they abused their powers. For all these reasons, the Directory decided to reduce their functions and their number, going from 426 to 138 in January 1925, and they were placed under the strict orders of the civil governors (in 1927 they were reduced to 72, working as advisors to the civil governors).

=== Municipal Statute of 1924 and Provincial Statute of 1925 ===
Political reform at the local level culminated with the enactment of the Municipal Statute of 1924, promoted by the then Director General of Local Administration, the former maurist José Calvo Sotelo. In the preamble of the Statute it was stated that "the State, in order to be democratic, must be supported by free municipalities", but the mayors continued to be appointed by the Government, and not elected by the residents.

Another step in the "dismantling of the caciquismo" was the dissolution of the provincial deputations in January 1924, with the exception of those of the Basque Country and Navarre. The civil governors were in charge of appointing their new members among liberal professionals and businessmen, which provoked the disaffection of the members of the Lliga Regionalista led by Josep Puig i Cadafalch, who at first had believed in the regionalist goodwill of Primo de Rivera, since those appointed to the four Catalan deputations, as in the town councils, were Spanishists, mostly from the National Monarchist Union.

However, according to Eduardo González Calleja, "the dictatorship did not manage to eradicate the caciquismo, but rather to change the holders of the fiefdoms". Furthermore, despite the fact that "its decisions had an important propagandistic echo that allowed the regime's popularity to be reinforced", "the interventionist character of the dictatorial policy as a whole increased the bureaucracy, and along with it the favored treatment of those with similar interests, the abusive accumulation of positions and the salary compensations with representation expenses, bonuses, and so on. In short, no real reform of the local or provincial administration was achieved, but the survival of clientelist attitudes disguised with superficial measures of a disciplinary nature against the most flagrant corrupt or unpatriotic actions". In reality, "the fundamental reason for the crisis of caciquismo during the period of the dictatorship was the marginalization from power for so long of the parties of the day", although many caciques found refuge in the single party of the dictatorship, the Patriotic Union.

== Affiliation with the Church ==
In Primo de Rivera's "regenerationist" project, the Catholic religion had a very important role, which is why from the very first moment he proclaimed the defense of the moral and material interests of the Church, as could be seen in the ultramontane speech delivered by King Alfonso XIII in November 1923 before Pope Pius IX in Rome:

If one day... the faith were to demand the greatest sacrifices from Catholics; and if, in defense of the persecuted, new Urban II, you were to raise a Crusade against the enemies of our holy religion, Spain and its king, most faithful to your mandates, would never desert the place of honor that its glorious traditions point out

One of the first measures taken by Primo de Rivera was to renounce in March 1924 the intervention of the State in the appointment of the bishops of the Spanish dioceses, a prerogative —the Patronato real— that had always been exercised by the governments of the Restoration. The result was that vacant seats were occupied by integralist bishops, among whom Pedro Segura stood out, who at only 46 years of age occupied the primate seat of Toledo and in 1927 was named cardinal. The only conflict that the dictatorship had with the Catholic Church was due to the resistance of the Catalan bishops, led by the archbishop of Tarragona, Francesc Vidal i Barraquer, and by the bishop of Barcelona José Miralles y Sbert, to order the parish priests to preach in Spanish.

== Patriotic Union: an "apolitical" party ==
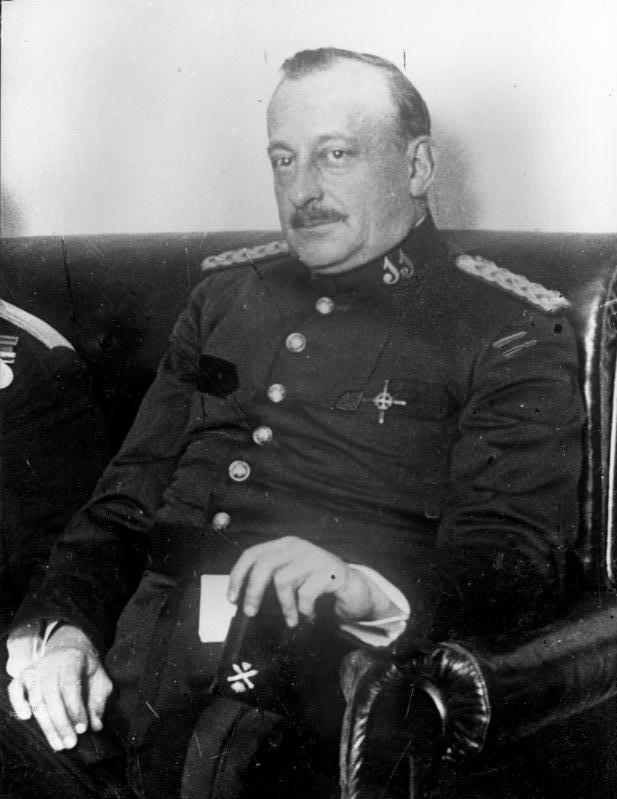
General Miguel Primo de Rivera.

Some months after the establishment of the dictatorship of Miguel Primo de Rivera in September 1923, the dictator began to forge the idea that it was not enough to "regenerate" the country to put an end to the "oligarchy" and "dismantle the caciquismo", as he had proposed, but that it was also necessary a "new politics", supported by "people of healthy ideas" and men "of good faith" who would form a "political party, but apolitical, which exercises a political-administrative action". A political force that would not define the objectives and policies to be applied, but would take charge of the administration of the State, putting into practice the regenerationist motto of "less politics, more administration".

As a starting point to build the new political organization, Primo de Rivera first thought of La Traza, a Barcelona group imitating fascism, but after his trip to Italy in November 1923, he opted for the organizations promoted by the Catholic right that would create the Castilian Patriotic Union (UPC), a political force that tried to follow in the footsteps of the Catholic Italian People's Party. The first president of the UPC was the Catholic professor Eduardo Callejo, very close to Ángel Herrera, founder and promoter of the National Catholic Association of Propagandists, and its initial ideology was a traditionalist and corporatist Catholicism, defending property and agrarian values.

On April 5, 1924, Primo de Rivera wrote a circular to the government delegates in which he urged them to "unite and organize all men of good will in order to prepare them for when the Directory had carried out its mission". Ten days later, the dictator outlined the basic lines of his project: to build a "political party but which in the end is apolitical in the ordinary sense of the word", which would try to "unite and organize all Spaniards of good will" and " healthy ideas" in the principles of "Religion, Homeland and Monarchy" —very close to the Carlist trilemma God, Homeland and King—. Consequently, the new organization would have no ideology, it would be incompatible with the Constitution of 1876, in effect until then, and its role would be to "excite the spirit of citizenship so that the Unions would come to form a parliamentary majority on which the King could rely and which would be the first step towards constitutional normality". On April 29, he gave instructions to the civil governors "to organize the new citizen hosts" creating UPT committees, many of which were appointed to form the new town councils according to the regulations of the recently approved Municipal Statute of 1924. Thus, the Patriotic Union was a party "organized from power and for power", as the minister of the dictatorship José Calvo Sotelo once stated.

Primo de Rivera defined the Patriotic Union as "a central, monarchical, moderate and serenely democratic party". One of its ideologues, the writer José María Pemán, took care to differentiate it from fascism and affirmed that the State defended by the Patriotic Union was the "traditional social-Christian" one, and also rejected universal suffrage, considered "a great mistake". The party was made up of people from the traditional Catholic right (anti-liberal and anti-democratic), from "Maurism" and other conservative sectors, "apolitical" of all kinds and also simple opportunists.

The base of the Patriotic Union was fundamentally local and provincial, and the National Board of Directors created in 1926 never had very precise functions. More important as a binder of the party was the role of the newspaper La Nación, the press organ of the Patriotic Union supported with funds from the Administration.

On the other hand, the effectiveness of the Patriotic Union in the "dismantling of the caciquism" was actually reduced, because "it incorporated in its ranks many former caciques and allowed the creation of new cacicazgos", as in the case of the province of Cadiz, cradle of Primo de Rivera, "where practically all the traditional caciques were integrated in the Patriotic Union".

== Strengthening of Spanish nationalism and fight against "separatism". ==
=== From "healthy regionalism" to "Spanishism". ===
The Manifesto of September 13 referred to the "shameless separatist propaganda" as one of the justifications for the coup. Five days later the Directory promulgated the Decree of September 18, 1923 against "separatism", punishing with severe penalties the "crimes against the security and unity of the Homeland", judged by military tribunals. Thus, the dictatorship opted from the first moment for "an authoritarian and belligerent Spanish nationalism. Symbols and entities related to other nationalisms were persecuted. Censorship reduced to the minimum expression not only the democratic and workers' press, but also publications in other languages. Political activities were severely limited and, in general, sub-state nationalisms and regionalisms went into a forced eclipse, which would last until 1929".

However, at first it seemed that Primo de Rivera supported "healthy regionalism" and a few days after the coup d'état he commissioned the Basque provincial councils to draw up a draft Statute, a task which the Provincial Council of Guipúzcoa fulfilled and presented it at the end of December 1923. But the Provincial Council of Vizcaya, dominated by the Monarchist Action League, was opposed and the project was abandoned. Likewise, Primo de Rivera declared on October 12 that he proposed to suppress "the 49 small provincial administrations" replacing them with 10, 12 or 14 regions endowed with "all that within the unity of the land it is possible to grant". This policy was confirmed with the offer made by the dictatorship to the conservative Galician nationalists of a Galician commonwealth in exchange for their collaboration with the regime's policy. A similar offer was made to the Valencian and Aragonese regionalists. In March 1924 the preliminary draft of the Galician Mancomunidad drafted by Vicente Risco and Antonio Losada Diéguez was approved in Santiago, but by then the "regionalist" impulse of the dictatorship had disappeared.

On January 13, 1924, Primo de Rivera decreed the dissolution of the provincial deputations, with the exception of the provincial councils of the Basque Country and Navarre, as he had done with the city councils three months earlier. The civil governors were in charge of appointing their new members from among liberal professionals, major contributors and directors of cultural, industrial and professional corporations. The new Provincial Councils were to report on the operational problems they detected and propose remedies.

The appointment of prominent "Spanishists", mostly from the National Monarchist Union, at the head of the Catalan deputations, as had already happened with the city councils, provoked the disaffection of the members of the Lliga Regionalista led by Josep Puig i Cadafalch, who had initially believed in the regionalist goodwill of Primo de Rivera.

Primo de Rivera entrusted the task of reforming the legal-administrative system of city councils and provincial councils to the young lawyer José Calvo Sotelo, a conservative politician from the Maurist party, whom he placed at the head of the General Directorate of Local Administration. Calvo Sotelo appointed a team of ex-Maurists and right-wing Catholics, such as José María Gil Robles, the Count of Vallellano, Josep Pi i Suñer, Miquel Vidal i Guardiola and Luis Jordana de Pozas, who collaborated in the elaboration of the Municipal Statute of 1924 and the Provincial Statute of 1925.

In a long unofficial note that accompanied the promulgation of the Provincial Statute, Primo de Rivera acknowledged that he had changed his opinion on "regionalism", because before he thought that this could be positive for the regeneration of Spain, but now he had realized that "to reconstruct from the power the region, to reinforce its personality, to exalt the differentiating pride between some and others is to contribute to undo the great work of national unity, is to initiate the disintegration, for which there is always stimulus in the pride or selfishness of men".

== Repression of Catalan language and popular culture ==
The "nationalizing" program also reached the schools where a "patriotic" and religious education was to be imparted. On October 27, 1923, a circular was published by the General Directorate of Primary Education in which teachers and inspectors were reminded of their duty to "teach the Castilian language in their respective schools and to teach in the same language". Months later, inspectors were given the power to close schools or suspend teachers who did not comply with this order. On October 13, 1925, the directors of the educational centers —and also the rectors of the Universities— were ordered to watch over the diffusion of "antisocial doctrines or against the unity of the Fatherland that could be exposed by some professors or teachers within their classes, proceeding of course with the greatest rigor to the formation of the opportune file prior suspension of employment and half salary, if there were sufficient indications of guilt". Likewise, books that were not written in Castilian or that contained doctrines contrary to the unity of the country had to be withdrawn, suspending the teacher who used them from employment and salary.

In Catalonia, it soon became clear that the Lliga Regionalista was wrong to support Primo de Rivera's coup, as he immediately carried out a policy of persecution of Catalan nationalism. Among other measures, Catalan was prohibited in official acts, attempts were made to suppress the use of Catalan in sermons and religious ceremonies, Spanish was imposed as the only administrative language, Catalan place names were Spanishified and changed, the Jocs Florals were boycotted (which had to be held abroad), the raising of the Catalan flag was prohibited, Sardana dancing was limited, professional, union and sports institutions were persecuted simply for using Catalan, and so on. This policy generated numerous conflicts with various Catalan institutions and Catalanist entities that refused to accept it, and many of them ended up being closed temporarily or permanently. This was the case, for example, of some offices of the Lliga Regionalista that were closed and its newspaper La Veu de Catalunya that was temporarily suspended.

In January 1924, Primo de Rivera met with some Catalan political leaders in Barcelona but only obtained the support of the Spanish National Monarchist Union, whose leader Alfonso Sala Argemí became president of the Mancomunitat after the resignation of Puig i Cadafalch. However, Sala ended up confronting the military authorities of Catalonia and protesting by letter to Primo de Rivera. Thus, when on March 12, 1925, the Provincial Statute of 1925 was approved, which in practice forbade the Mancomunitat, Sala resigned.

After the disappearance of the Mancomunitat, Primo de Rivera's statements on the culture, identity, language and institutions of Catalonia grew in virulence, expressing his total opposition to any kind of regional autonomy. As historian Genoveva García Queipo de Llano has pointed out, "Primo de Rivera offended not only political groups but the whole of Catalan society". Thus, there was a growing estrangement between Catalonia and the dictatorship, with conflicts progressively increasing. Acció Catalana took the "Catalan case" to the League of Nations and Francesc Macià, a former military man and founder of Estat Catalá, became the symbol of Catalonia's resistance to the dictatorship.

=== Repression of Basque nationalism ===
The dictatorship also harshly repressed Basque nationalism, especially the more radical sector that dominated the Basque Nationalist Party (PNV) at that time, while the moderate sector had formed its own organization, the Basque Nationalist Communion. Only a week after its formation, the directorate closed Aberri, the unofficial newspaper of the PNV, and ordered the Civil Guard to close the batzokis and other centers and societies of the PNV, which was de facto outlawed. On the other hand, the CNV was relatively tolerated. In 1924, its Guipuzcoa organization rejected separatism and voluntarily suspended its political activity, while "the SOV union accepted to participate in the Paritarian Committees of the dictatorship, and allied itself with other unions to defeat the UGT".

Both the PNV and the CNV focused thereafter on the promotion of religious activities (pilgrimages), leisure activities (hiking), cultural activities (dance, theater, music, promotion of the Basque language) or sports (soccer and cycling).

== Pacification of Morocco ==
=== From "abandonist" to the disembarkation of Al Hoceima ===
Regarding the "Morocco problem", General Primo de Rivera had always expressed an "abandonist" position, so he ordered the withdrawal of the troops to the coastal strip of the Spanish Protectorate in Morocco, with the consequent discomfort of the "Africanist" sector of the Army. Among them was Lieutenant Colonel Francisco Franco who wrote several articles in the Revista de Tropas Coloniales, in defense of Spanish colonialism. One of the underlying reasons for the opposition to the "abandonment" of Morocco was that the withdrawal meant the end of the quick promotions for "war merits", which had allowed the officers stationed in Africa to be promoted more quickly than those in the peninsular garrisons. This was the case of Lieutenant Colonel Franco himself, when he graduated he requested a posting in the African Army (in the "regulars", first in Melilla and then in Ceuta), and in only five years (from 1912 to 1917) he was promoted from lieutenant to commander for war merits. When Lieutenant Colonel Millán Astray organized the Foreign Legion in 1920 (following the French model), he appointed Major Franco as commander of one of its battalions. In 1922, Franco published Morocco, diary of a Flag, where he recounted his experience in the Legion. That same year, the conservative media, such as the ABC newspaper, put him as an example of a "soldier", in the face of the anti-militarist campaign that was unleashed after the "disaster of Annual". In 1923 he held the leadership of the Legion and was promoted to lieutenant colonel. When Primo de Rivera finally decided to resume the war in Morocco, Lieutenant Colonel Franco, like other "Africanist" officers, changed his attitude and became staunch supporters of the dictatorship. Lieutenant Colonel Franco was promoted in only three years to colonel and from colonel to general. He was 33 years old. If there had been no war, he would still be a captain, according to historian Gabriel Cardona.

In March 1924, Primo de Rivera ordered the withdrawal of troops from the area of Yebala and Xauen, which would allow the lines to be shortened. But the withdrawal was effected in terrible weather conditions and was taken advantage of by Abd el-Krim, the leader of the self-proclaimed Republic of the Rif, to launch an offensive, so the operation was a catastrophe. There were more casualties than in the disaster of Annual three years earlier, although with a lower number of dead, and Abd el-Krim seized a good part of the Spanish protectorate. Primo de Rivera managed to hide the magnitude of the disaster from public opinion thanks to censorship, but in October 1924 he had to personally assume the position of Spanish High Commissioner in Morocco. Only the mistake of the Rifian rebels to attack the French positions in the spring of 1925 allowed Primo de Rivera to save the situation.

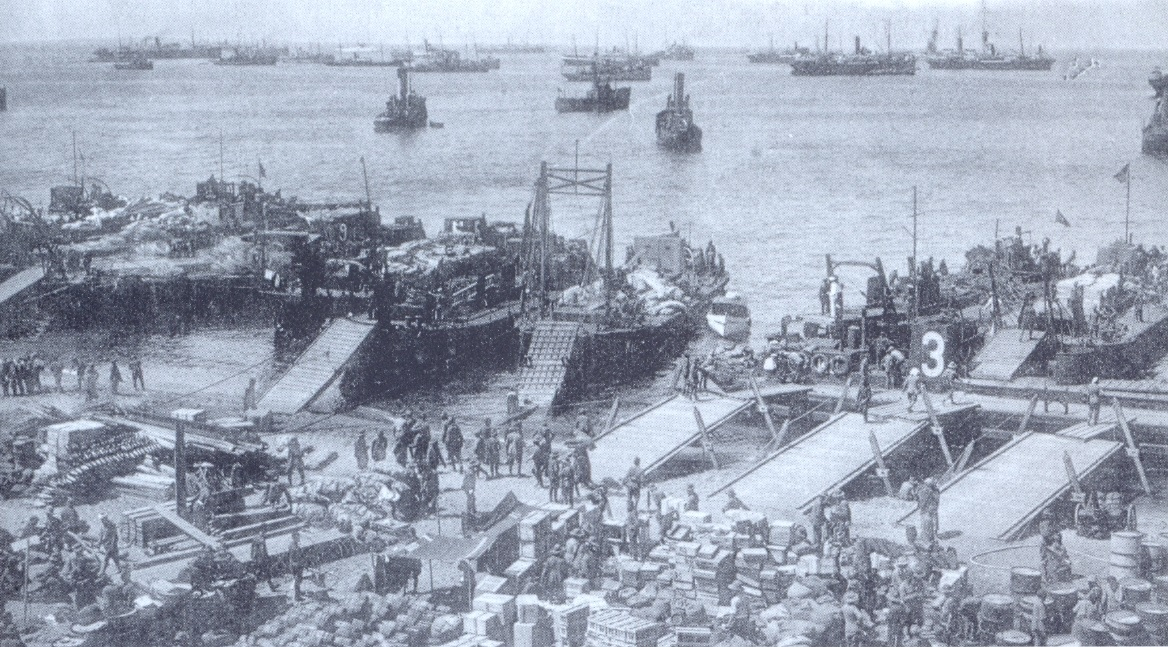
Landing of Al Hoceima, September 1925.

Abd el-Krim's attack on the areas of Morocco under French protectorate was enough for France for the first time to show its willingness to collaborate with Spain to put an end to the Rifian rebellion. From this collaboration arose the project of the Al Hoceima landing that took place in September 1925 and was a complete success because it caught the enemy from behind and split in two the area controlled by the rebels. Thus in April 1926, Abd el-Krim requested negotiations and the following year Morocco was completely pacified, ceasing to be a problem for Spain. In his obsession not to fall into the hands of the Spanish army, Abd el-Krim surrendered to the French who deported him to Reunion Island.

According to Genoveva García Queipo de Llano,

The victory in Morocco was, without a doubt, the most spectacular triumph of Primo de Rivera's government, and laid the foundations for the dictatorship's foreign policy in the future. General Primo de Rivera's will to remain in power from 1925 onwards, despite the fact that he himself had indicated the provisional nature of his regime, was precisely that he had solved a problem that had been the nightmare of all Spanish rulers since 1898.

=== Issue of responsibilities ===
Once the parliament was closed and the documentation of the Commission of Responsibilities was seized, the trials of the military accused for the disaster of Annual were placed under the jurisdiction of the Supreme Council of War and Navy. On February 25, General Cavalcanti, a member of the Quadrilateral, was acquitted, which caused the president of the Supreme Council, General Aguilera, to resign. Four months later, on June 19, the trial began against General Dámaso Berenguer and other generals, chiefs and officers involved in the Annual disaster. Dámaso Berenguer was forced to leave active service, but the rest of the defendants were either acquitted or received light sentences. In July 1927, Primo de Rivera granted amnesty to Berenguer and the rest of the condemned. In this way, according to González Calleja, "the division of the Army over the vexed issue of responsibilities was put to rest". As Santos Juliá pointed out, "once the direction of the war had been handed over to the Africanists, it made no sense to continue with the irritating issue of responsibilities, which was definitively closed".

== Composition ==
Composition of the Government
Position	Titleholder	Start	End	Political party
President of the Military Directory	Miguel Primo de Rivera	September 15, 1923	December 3, 1925	Military
Vice President and spokesman of the Navy	Antonio Magaz y Pers, Count de Magaz	September 15, 1923	December 3, 1925	Military
Spokesman of the I Military Region	Adolfo Vallespinosa y Vioz	September 15, 1923	December 3, 1925	Military
Spokesman of the II Military Region	Luis Hermosa y Kith	September 15, 1923	December 3, 1925	Military
Spokesman of the III Military Region	Luis Navarro y Alonso de Celada	September 15, 1923	December 3, 1925	Military
Spokesman of the IV Military Region	Dalmiro Rodríguez Pedré	September 15, 1923	December 3, 1925	Military
Spokesman of the V Military Region	Antonio Mayandía Gómez	September 15, 1923	December 3, 1925	Military
Spokesman of the VI Military Region	Francisco Gómez-Jordana Sousa	September 15, 1923	December 3, 1925	Military
Spokesman of the VII Military Region	Francisco Ruiz del Portal	September 15, 1923	December 3, 1925	Military
Spokesman of the VIII Military Region	Mario Muslera Perales	September 15, 1923	December 3, 1925	Military

=== Responsibles for the abolished ministries ===
Composition of the Government
Position	Titleholder	Start	End	Political party
Presidency of the Council	Carlos Fort y Morales de los Ríos	September 18, 1923	December 3, 1925	Military
Responsible for the State	Fernando Espinosa de los Monteros y Bermejillo	September 15, 1923	December 3, 1925	Diplomat
Responsible for Grace and Justice	Fernando Cadalso Manzano	September 17, 1923	December 21, 1923	Lawyer
Responsible for Grace and Justice	Ernesto Jiménez Sánchez	December 21, 1923	January 22, 1924	Magistrate
Responsible for Grace and Justice	Francisco García-Goyena y Alzugaray	January 22, 1924	December 3, 1925	Jurist
Responsible for War	Luis Bermúdez de Castro y Tomás	September 15, 1923	July 4, 1924	Military
Responsible for War	Juan O'Donnell y Vargas	July 4, 1924	December 3, 1925	Military
Responsible for Treasury	Enrique Illana y Sánchez de Vargas	September 17, 1923	December 21, 1923	Politician
Responsible for Treasury	Carlos Vergara Caillaux	December 21, 1923	February 25, 1924	Lawyer
Responsible for Treasury	José Corral y Larre	February 25, 1924	December 3, 1925	Politician
Responsible for the Navy	Gabriel Antón Iboleón	September 15, 1923	February 5, 1924	Military
Responsible for the Navy	Federico Ibáñez Valera (interim)	February 5, 1924	February 12, 1924	Military
Responsible for the Navy	Ignacio Pintado y Gough	February 12, 1924	May 25, 1924	Military
Responsible for the Navy	Honorio Cornejo y Carvajal	May 25, 1924	December 3, 1925	Military
Responsible for Governance	Millán Millán de Priego	September 17, 1923	September 22, 1923	Lawyer
Responsible for Governance	Severiano Martínez Anido	September 22, 1923	December 3, 1925	Military
Responsible for Development	José Vicente Arche	September 17, 1923	December 21, 1923	
Responsible for Development	Pedro Vives y Vich	December 21, 1923	December 3, 1925	Engineer
Responsible for Public Instruction and Fine Arts	Alfonso Pérez Gómez-Nieva	September 17, 1923	December 21, 1923	Writer
Responsible for Public Instruction and Fine Arts	Javier García de Leániz	December 21, 1923	December 3, 1925	Jurist
Responsible for Labor, Commerce and Industry	Alejandro García Martín	September 17, 1923	December 21, 1923	
Responsible for Labor, Commerce and Industry	Juan Flórez Posada	December 21, 1923	February 7, 1924	Engineer
Responsible for Labor, Commerce and Industry	Eduardo Aunós Pérez	February 7, 1924	December 3, 1925	Politician

Predecessor: Fifth Government of Manuel García Prieto	September 15, 1923 - December 3, 1925	Successor: Civil Directory of Primo de Rivera

== See also ==
- 1923 Spanish coup d'état
- 1926 Spanish coup d'état
- Civil directorate of Miguel Primo de Rivera
- Fall of the dictatorship of Miguel Primo de Rivera

== Bibliography ==
- Barrio Alonso, Ángeles (2004). La modernización de España (1917-1939). Política y sociedad (in Spanish). Madrid: Síntesis. ISBN 84-9756-223-2.
- Ben-Ami, Shlomo (2012) [1983]. El cirujano de hierro. La dictadura de Primo de Rivera (1923-1930) [Fascism from above: Dictathorship of Primo de Rivera in Spain] (in Spanish). Barcelona: RBA. ISBN 978-84-9006-161-9.
- De la Granja, José Luis; Beramendi, Justo; Anguera, Pere (2001). La España de los nacionalismos y las autonomías (in Spanish). Madrid: Síntesis. ISBN 84-7738-918-7.
- Cardona, Gabriel (2003). "El joven Franco. Cómo se forja un dictador". Clío (in Spanish) (16): 18–24.
- García Queipo de Llano, Genoveva (1997). El reinado de Alfonso XIII. La modernización fallida (in Spanish). Madrid: Historia 16. ISBN 84-7679-318-9.
- González Calleja, Eduardo (2005). La España de Primo de Rivera. La modernización autoritaria 1923-1930 (in Spanish). Madrid: Alianza Editorial. ISBN 84-206-4724-1.
- Juliá, Santos (1999). Un siglo de España. Política y sociedad (in Spanish). Madrid: Marcial Pons. ISBN 84-9537903-1.
- Morodo, Raúl (1973). "El 18 Brumario español. La Dictadura de Primo de Rivera". Triunfo (in Spanish) (572): 22–31.
- Tavera, Susanna (1984). "Els anarcosindicalistes catalans i la dictadura". L'Avenç (in Catalan) (72).
- Tusell, Javier (2003). "Primo de Rivera. El golpe". La Aventura de la Historia (in Spanish) (59).
