= Medal of Merit in Research and University Education =

Spanish decoration

- Golden badge medal

Awarded by the King of Spain
- Type: medal of merit
- Established: 19 May 1980; 46 years ago
- Royal house: House of Bourbon-Anjou
- Eligibility: Spanish and foreign citizens
- Awarded for: outstanding services in the fields of university education and scientific and technical research
- Status: Extant
- Sovereign: King Felipe VI
- Grand Chancellor: Diana Morant, Minister of the Science
- Chancellor: Under-Secretary of Science
- Grades: Gold
- Post-nominals: MMIEU

Statistics
- First induction: 2010
- Total inductees: 9

The Medal of Merit in Research and University Education (Spanish: Medalla al Mérito en la Investigación y en la Educación Universitaria) is a Spanish decoration whose purpose is to reward those individuals or entities who have distinguished themselves in the development and promotion of university education and scientific and technical research.

This decoration was established in May 1980 by minister Luis González Seara, however, it was not until 19 November 2010, more than 30 years after the creation of the Medal, that the first medal was awarded. The first person to receive this honor was the biochemist Santiago Grisolía, 1st Marquess of Grisolía.

Until 2026, the medal consisted of three categories—gold, silver, and bronze—however, in April 2026 it was reformed and its categories unified, with there currently being only one gold category.

== Grades and symbols ==
After the reform made by Royal Decree 318/2026, of April 15, the medal consists of a unique gold category, with the following insignias:

Article 1. The "Medal for Merit in Research and University Education", in its gold category will consist of a cartouche flanked by two laurel branches. This cartouche will bear an oval shield with the traditional arms of Castile, León, Aragon, Navarre, and Granada, and in the center, three fleurs-de-lis (representing the ruling House of Bourbon-Anjou). The entire design will be surrounded by the inscription "Merit in Research and University Education". A royal crown will surmount the design.

On the reverse, an effigy of King Alfonso VIII will be depicted, along with the inscription "Adephonsvs VIII. Rex. Studium. Palentinvm. A.D. MCCVIII. Institvit" (King Alfonso VIII founded the University of Palencia in the year 1208").

The metal elements of the medal will be gold, silver, or bronze, depending on the category, and its dimensions will be 85 millimeters long by 47 millimeters wide.

Article 2. The Medal will be worn hanging from a green ribbon 45 millimeters wide with a central white stripe of 4 millimeters.

Article 3. This decoration will also include, on the left side of the chest, a badge consisting of a reduced-size version of the Order's Medal superimposed on a halo 80 millimeters in diameter, all in gold.

— Order of the Minister of Universities and Research of 15 July 1980, modified by Royal Decree 318/2026, of April 15.

== Advisory Council ==
An Advisory Council will be established to advise the science minister on whether or not to award a medal. This Council is chaired by the Secretary of State for Science, Innovation and Universities and integrated by: the Ministry's Under-Secretary (who serves as deputy chair), the president of the Spanish National Research Council, four university rectors or former rectors, four relevant personalities in the university and research fields and a representative of each category of winners. A high-ranking civil servant of the Ministry of Science serves as the Council's secretary.

Any individual or organization, public or private, related to the university and science, may nominate a candidate.

== Recipients ==
Name	Profession	Category	Year of concession	Notes
Santiago Grisolía, 1st Marquess of Grisolía	biochemist	Gold	2010	
María Vallet-Regí	inorganic chemist	Gold	2019	
María Dolores Cabezudo Ibáñez	food chemist researcher	Gold	2019	
Emilio Lledó	philosopher	Gold	2019	
Margarita Salas, 1st Marchioness of Canero	biochemist	Gold	2019	Posthumously
Santos Juliá	historian	Gold	2019	Posthumously
Mariano Esteban Rodríguez	virologist	Silver	2020	
Luis Enjuanes Sánchez	virologist	Silver	2020	
María José Alonso	pharmacy researcher	Silver	2020	

== See also ==
- Orders, decorations, and medals of Spain
