= Marquess of Grisolía =

- Creation date: 13 May 2014
- Created by: Juan Carlos I of Spain
- First holder: Santiago Grisolía García
- Present holder: James Santiago Grisolía
- Remainder to: Heirs of the body of the grantee

Marquess of Grisolía is a hereditary title of Spanish nobility. It was created on 13 May 2014 by King Juan Carlos I of Spain in favor of Santiago Grisolía García, biochemist, researcher and teacher.

== Marquesses of Grisolía (2014) ==
- Santiago Grisolía García, 1st Marquess of Grisolía (2014–2022)
- James Santiago Grisolía, 2nd Marquess of Grisolía (2025–present)
