= Santiago Grisolía, 1st Marquess of Grisolía =

Spanish biochemisist (1923–2022)

1st Marquess of Grisolía Santiago Grisolía
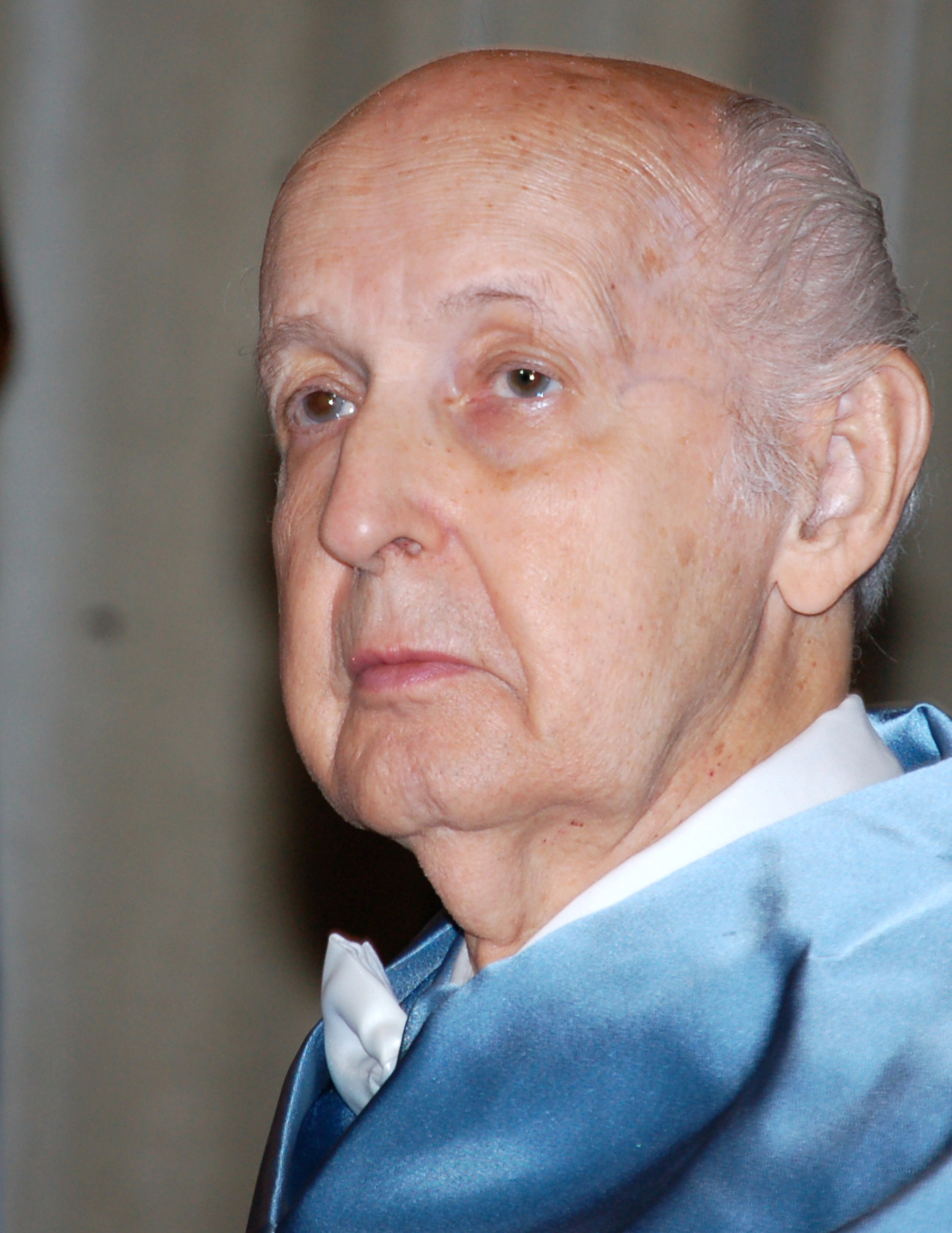
- Grisolía in 2011
- Born: Santiago Grisolía García; 6 January 1923; Valencia, Spain
- Died: 4 August 2022 (aged 99); Valencia, Spain
- Education: New York University
- Awards: Grand Cross of the Civil Order of Health (1984); Grand Cross of Civil Order of Alfonso X, the Wise (1987); Princess of Asturias Award for Technical and Scientific Research (1990); Grand Cross of the Order of Civil Merit (1992)
- Scientific career
- Fields: Biochemistry
- Workplaces: Institute of Cytological Research
- Academic advisors: Severo Ochoa

Santiago Grisolía García, 1st Marquess of Grisolía (6 January 1923 – 4 August 2022) was a Spanish biochemist.

== Career ==
Born in Valencia, Spain, Grisolía studied at the University of Valencia, obtaining his doctorate in medicine in 1949 before continuing his studies at New York University, under Severo Ochoa. He later became a professor of biochemistry and biology at universities in Kansas, Chicago and Wisconsin.

Grisolía published over 400 scientific papers and was involved with numerous organizations in Spain and other countries. It is impossible to summarize such a large output in a few words, but some references give an indication of his work and publications, many of which were concerned with enzymes. Much of his first work concerned the biochemistry of citrulline, and he later worked on phosphoglycerate mutase, carbamoyl-phosphate synthetase and other enzymes. He has held various positions, including President of the Scientific Coordination Committee of the Human Genome Project for UNESCO.

He died in Valencia in 2022 at the age of 99.

== Awards ==
He was appointed Grand Cross of the Civil Order of Health in 1984. He was further honoured when he was appointed Grand Cross of Civil Order of Alfonso X, the Wise in 1987. In 1992 he was appointed Grand Cross of the Order of Civil Merit.

Grisolía was awarded the Princess of Asturias Award for Technical and Scientific Research in 1990. In 2010, he was the first recipient of the Medal of Merit in Research and University Education, in its gold category.

He was ennobled by King Juan Carlos I on 13 May 2014 as Marquess of Grisolía, in recognition of his work as a researcher and teacher and his contribution to science. That same year he was granted a coat of arms depicting natural enzyme crystals and the chemical composition of glutamic acid.

Spanish nobility
New creation	Marquess of Grisolía; 2014–2022	Succeeded by Vacant
