= María Vallet-Regí =

Spanish scientist and chemist

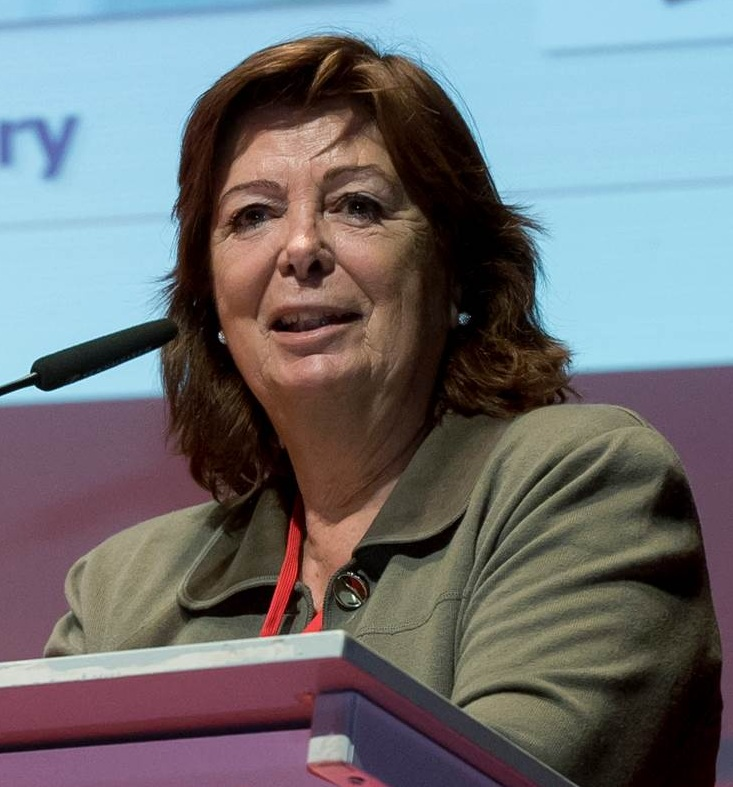
Vallet-Regí in 2017

María Vallet-Regí (born 19 April 1946) is a Spanish inorganic chemist. As of 2012, she heads the Smart Biomaterials group at the Universidad Complutense de Madrid.

== Early life ==
María Vallet-Regí was born in Las Palmas, Spain. She studied chemistry at the Universidad Complutense de Madrid (Spain) and received her Ph.D. there in 1974.

== Career ==
As of 2012, she is a full professor of inorganic chemistry and head of the research group Smart Biomaterials in the Department of Inorganic and Bioinorganic Chemistry of the Faculty of Pharmacy at Universidad Complutense de Madrid.

Vallet-Regí has written more than 600 articles and several books. She was the most-cited Spanish scientist, according to ISI Web of Knowledge, in the field of Materials Science in these past decades.

== Research areas ==
- Bioceramic-based bone-grafting materials and scaffolds for regenerative biomedicine.
- Production and study of bioceramic systems for controlled release of biotechnological and antitumoral species.
- Nanoparticles and biocompatible matrices for biotechnological applications.
- Silica-based ordered mesoporous materials as release systems of biologically active species, cell encapsulation in silica porous materials, mesoporous materials for gene therapy and transfection, organic-inorganic hybrid materials.

== Awards and honors ==
María Vallet-Reg is Fellow of Biomaterials Science and Engineering at the International College of Fellows of Biomaterials Science and Engineering (ICF-BSE), Numbered Fellow of the Spanish Royal Academy of Engineering and the Royal National Academy of Pharmacy.

She received the Prix Franco-Espagnol 2000 from Societé Française de Chimie, the Spanish Royal Society of Chemistry (RSEQ) award in Inorganic Chemistry 2008, the Spanish National Research Award in Engineering 2008, FEIQUE Research award 2011 and the RSEQ Research Award and Gold Medal 2011.

In 2019 she was awarded with the Medal of Merit in Research and University Education, in its gold category.
