= Emilio Lledó =

Spanish philosopher (born 1927)

The Most Excellent Emilio Lledó
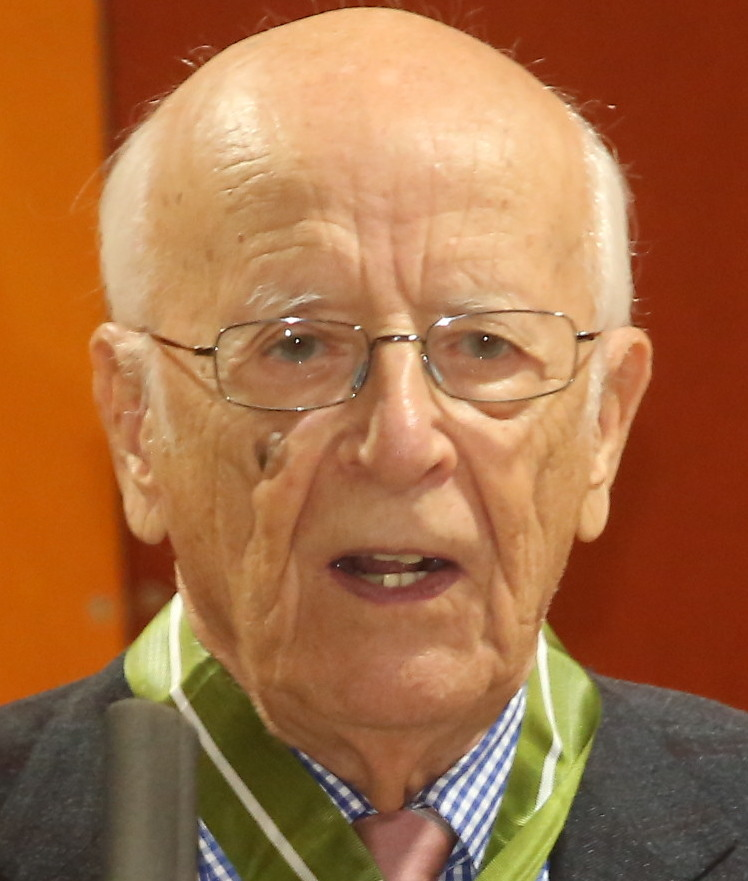
- Lledó in 2019
- Born: Emilio Lledó Íñigo; 5 November 1927 (age 99); Seville, Spain

Seat l of the Real Academia Española
- Incumbent
- Assumed office 27 November 1994 (Note: Elected on 11 November 1993)
- Preceded by: Joaquín Calvo Sotelo

Emilio Lledó Íñigo (born 5 November 1927) is a Spanish philosopher. He has been a professor at several universities and is a member of the Royal Spanish Academy.

== Career ==
He took his bachelor's degree at the Instituto de Bachillerato Cervantes and, in 1952, his degree in philosophy at the Complutense University of Madrid. He went to Germany to continue his studies in classical philosophy with Hans-Georg Gadamer, who helped him to finish his doctoral thesis by securing him a scholarship from the Alexander von Humboldt Foundation. In 1955, he obtained a position at the Complutense University of Madrid, but returned to Germany after his marriage in 1958 because Gadamer, who was then a Dean of the faculty at the University of Heidelberg, had offered him a position there.

In 1962, he again returned to Spain, taking a job as an instructor at the Instituto Núñez de Arce in Valladolid. After two years, he obtained a chair at the University of La Laguna. Shortly thereafter, in 1967, he moved to the University of Barcelona, where he had been given the chair in Philosophy. In 1978, he moved again, to the National University of Distance Education (UNED), where he remained until his retirement.

Lledó was elected to Seat l of the Real Academia Española on 11 November 1993, he took up his seat on 27 November 1994.

== Philosophical thought ==
According to Lledó, the history of philosophy should be understood as a form of "collective memory", embracing mankind's total development, that can be structured through three main elements:

1. Classical Greek philosophy, with special attention to the Platonic dialogues and Aristotelian ethics as well as Epicureanism.
2. Attention to language as the principal object of philosophical analysis; which clearly converges in the development of the main currents of post-war European thought.
3. Elaborating fully a consideration of temporality and writing that will lead to a "philosophy of memory" and a textual anthropology, from hermeneutic roots.

== Selected works ==
- Filosofía y Lenguaje, Ariel (1970)
- La Memoria del Logos, Taurus (1984) ISBN 84-306-1250-5
- Memoria de la Ética, Taurus (1994) ISBN 84-306-0094-9
- El Silencio de la Escritura, Espasa (1998) ISBN 84-239-7439-1
- El Surco del Tiempo: Meditaciones Sobre el Mito Platónico de la Escritura y la Memoria, Crítica (2000) ISBN 84-8432-144-4
- Elogio de la infelicidad, Cuatro (2005) ISBN 84-934176-0-2
- Ser Quien Eres: Ensayos para una Educación Democrática , University of Zaragoza (2009) ISBN 84-92521-98-8
- Lenguaje e Historia, Dykinson (2011) ISBN 84-998221-0-X
- El Epicureísmo, Taurus (2011) ISBN 84-306-0869-9
- La Filosofía, Hoy, RBA (2012) ISBN 84-90064-20-2
- Los Libros y la Libertad, RBA (2013) ISBN 84-90065-68-3.
- Palabra y humanidad, KRK (2015).
- Pensar es conversar. Diálogo entre filósofos, with Manuel Cruz, RBA (2015).
- Fidelidad a Grecia, Cuatro (2015) ISBN 9788493856663.

== Honors and awards ==
- Life member of the Institute for Advanced Study, Berlin (1988)
- Elected to the Royal Spanish Academy (1993)
- Menéndez Pelayo International Prize (2004)
- Order of Merit of the Federal Republic of Germany (2005)
- Lázaro Carreter Prize, from the Germán Sánchez Ruipérez Foundation (2007)
- Princess of Asturias Award (2015)
- Gold Medal of Merit in Research and University Education (2019)
- A library has been named after him in Salteras, his parents' hometown.
