= Dictatorship of Miguel Primo de Rivera =

1923–1930 government in Spain

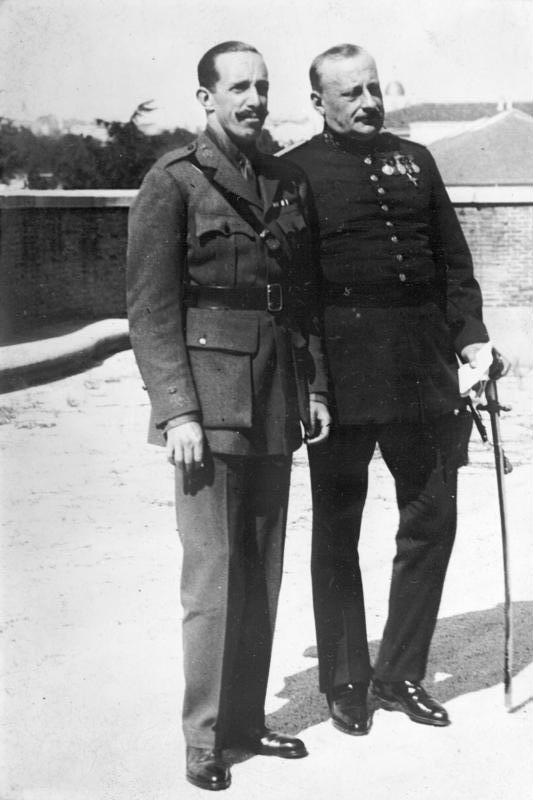
(from left) Alfonso XIII and Miguel Primo de Rivera

General Miguel Primo de Rivera's dictatorship over Spain began with a coup on 13 September 1923 and ended with his resignation on 28 January 1930. It took place during the wider reign of King Alfonso XIII. In establishing his dictatorship, Primo de Rivera ousted the liberal government led by Prime Minister Manuel García Prieto and initially gained the support of King Alfonso XIII and the army. During the Military Directory (1923–1925), the dictatorship created the official party of the regime, the Unión Patriótica (UP). It also censored the Spanish press and worked to eliminate separatism in Catalonia. Under Primo de Rivera's dictatorship, Spain won the Rif War, where Spanish forces fought Riffian tribes in Morocco.

Primo de Rivera's dictatorship established the Civil Directory in 1925. During the Civil Directory, Primo de Rivera created the National Assembly, where Spanish corporations had their interests represented. The dictatorship formed good relationships with Italy and increased its interactions with countries in Latin America. It invested heavily in Spanish infrastructure, such as roads and railways, and expanded labour laws to assist nursing mothers in the workforce. Throughout the dictatorship, women became an increasing percentage of Spain's skilled labour. In 1929 an economic downturn occurred, and the value of the Spanish peseta fell. The army's grievances with Primo de Rivera grew, and seeing this, the King stopped supporting the dictatorship. Primo de Rivera resigned in 1930, ending his dictatorship, and General Dámaso Berenguer succeeded him before Spain's Second Republic was established in 1931.

== Background ==
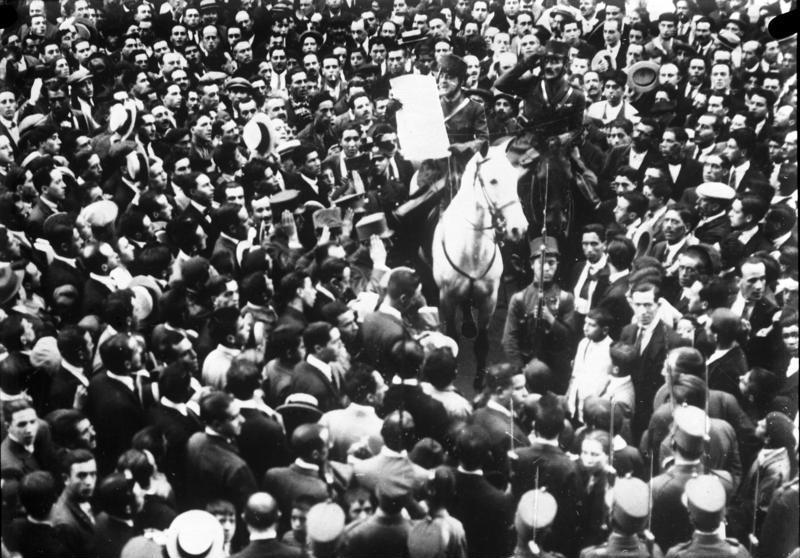
Announcement of the new government of Primo de Rivera in Madrid, 1923

After the 1898 Spanish defeat to the United States, where Spain lost its remaining colonies in the Philippines, Cuba, and Puerto Rico, Spain experienced increasing social strife. Along with the defeat of Annual in 1921 against Riffian tribesmen in Spain's Moroccan Protectorate, Spain was dominated by a desire for regeneration. Following the defeat at Annual, the Spanish parliament inquired into assigning responsibility for the loss. Right before Primo de Rivera took over, the results of this inquiry were going to be released to the public, and they implicated many high-ranking military officials. This exacerbated the deteriorating relationship between the politicians and the military, who felt the politicians were to blame. The military at first planned to install a new government led by General Francisco Aguilera, president of the Supreme Council of Military Justice, but they ultimately chose Primo de Rivera to lead this new government.

== The coup (1923) ==
On 13 September, Primo de Rivera staged a successful coup d’état in Barcelona in the mould of 19th-century pronunciamientos. With the army's support, he ousted the parliamentary government of Marquis Manuel García Prieto. Primo de Rivera stated he would create a temporary government to save Spain from the corrupt politicians that had been mismanaging it since 1898. (Note: For a translated version of Primo de Rivera's manifesto to Spain after his coup, see Cowans 2003, pp. 126–128) Shortly after, on 14 September, King Alfonso XIII declared his support for Primo de Rivera's coup and dismissed the civilian government, suspending the 1876 Spanish constitution. He made Primo de Rivera the head of a new Military Directory, with powers to propose "whatever decrees are convenient" to the king.

There was initially much support in Spain for the coup. Not only were conservative newspapers like La Vanguardia supportive, liberal media such as El Sol also stated their support for the regime on the understanding that Primo de Rivera would leave power in three months, as he initially declared. In El Sol, Jose Ortega y Gasset wrote: "The alpha and omega of the military directory's task is to do away with the old politics. Their goal is so excellent as to preclude reservations." The Catholic Church and the wider Spanish public also showed their backing of the dictatorship, and the stock market rising immediately after the coup is indicative of the confidence Spaniards had in the new regime. Some of the only detractors of the coup were the small Communist party (Partido Comunista de España) and Anarchist trade unions.

== The Military Directory (1923–1925) ==
=== Ideology ===
The Military Directory consisted of eight generals and one admiral. They were subordinate to Primo de Rivera, who could alone approve Decrees for the Directory and present them to the king to sign. Primo de Rivera framed the formation of his dictatorship as a patriotic action against the ineffectiveness of Spain's liberal system. Through this, Primo de Rivera presented himself as Joaquín Costa's 'Iron Surgeon,' who would perform surgery on Spain to cure the political corruption and social chaos that plagued it. He stated: "I have no experience in government. Our methods are as simple as they are ingenious. They are methods for which the good of the [homeland] dictates and our resolutions are taken while we are kneeling at the shrine of the national spirit." Primo de Rivera connected many of his speeches with religious themes, and Catholicism was integral to his dictatorship's discourse. Primo de Rivera stated how disseminating patriotism was 'preaching', and he collaborated with the Catholic Church throughout his dictatorship to promote patriotism and patriotic ideas on a large scale.

=== Policies ===
Emblem of the Unión Patriótica. It displays the date of Primo de Rivera's coup: 13 September 1923.

Primo de Rivera ordered the termination of all local governments as he attempted to remove political corruption in Spain, replacing the civil officials with military supervised positions. In April 1924, Primo de Rivera created the Unión Patriótica (UP). UP was the official party of the dictatorship, and it united around vague patriotic ideas, taking the motto: Nation, Church, and King. The party's creation aimed to give the dictatorship credibility and maintain the public's conformity under Primo de Rivera's dictatorship. Once in power, Primo de Rivera's dictatorship quickly enforced laws against separatism, which banned teaching the Catalan language, singing the Catalan national anthem, and displaying the Catalan flag. After the coup, the dictatorship also imposed rigid censorship on the press. It censored all publications, telephones, and telegraphs and encouraged them to promote patriotic ideas.

=== The Rif War ===
Primo de Rivera promised early into the Military Directory that he would find a quick solution to the Rif War, where Riffian rebels opposed the Spanish colonial presence in northern Morocco. Primo de Rivera initially aimed to negotiate with Abd-el-Krim, the Riffian leader, to end the conflict. He withdrew 29,000 recruits from Spain's Moroccan Protectorate by the end of 1923 and an additional 26,000 by March 1924. In total, Primo de Rivera abandoned 180 military bases by mid-December. In doing so, he also aimed to reduce the costs of the campaign to Spain and the dictatorship. This withdrawal displeased many africanistas in the army, who encouraged a more aggressive policy in Morocco. The pressure from the africanistas, along with an escalating Riffian offensive in 1924, persuaded Primo de Rivera that continuing his withdrawal would have severe political consequences and could endanger his regime. His dictatorship secured French aid in 1925, and following a successful military operation in Al Hoceima, Spain and France pushed back Abd-el-Krim's forces and regained some control of the Spanish protectorate. After the dictatorship's victory, the Military Directory organised celebrations country-wide. It awarded Primo de Rivera a high honour in the Spanish military, the Gran Cruz Laureada de San Fernando.

== The Civil Directory (1925–1930) ==
=== The new government ===
In December 1925, Primo de Rivera's dictatorship transitioned from the Military Directory to the Civil Directory. During the Civil Directory, Primo de Rivera created the National Assembly, where corporate interests were represented rather than voters' individual interests. Groups such as the UP, the Church, and the army were represented in the National Assembly, along with local governments and various economic organisations. Primo de Rivera also decreed that the military officials still holding government positions must return to their military duties, and civil governors were appointed to replace them. With the creation of the Civil Directory, Primo de Rivera rejected returning to a parliamentary system, as promised in 1923, and oriented towards a long-term rule for his dictatorship.

=== Foreign policy ===
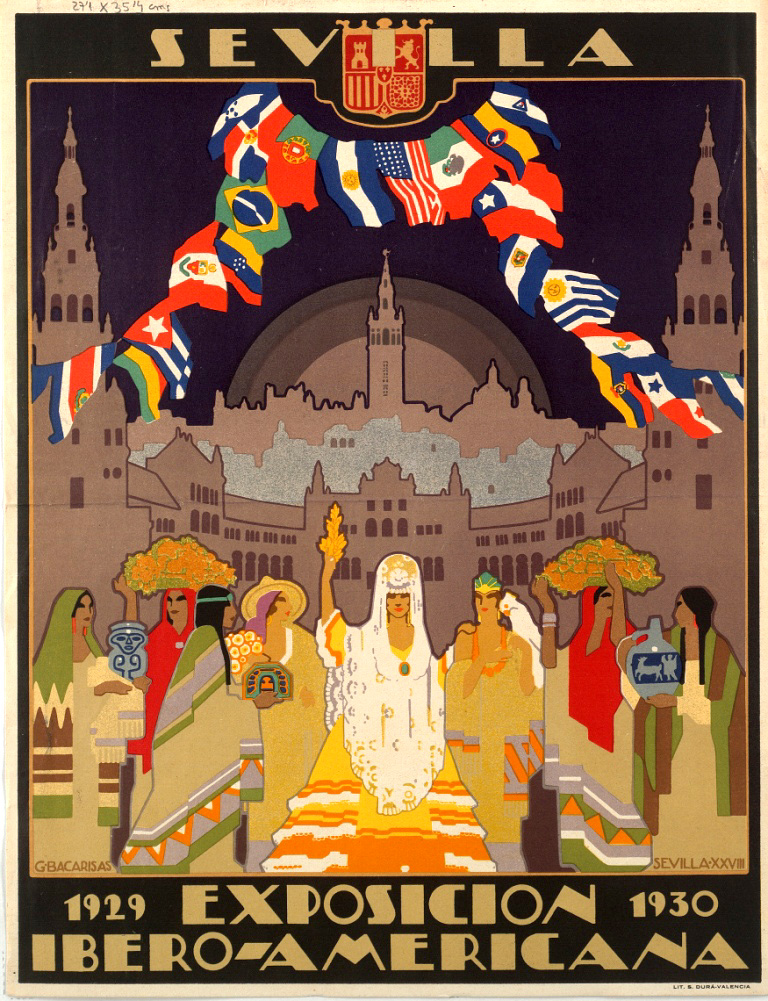
Poster for the 1929 Iberian-American Exhibition in Seville.

Primo de Rivera's dictatorship formed good relationships with Fascist Italy. The dictatorship banned the press from attacking Fascist Italy, and Primo de Rivera spoke of his admiration for Italy's Prime Minister, Mussolini. Primo de Rivera also linked his dictatorship to Spain's former colonies in Latin America. The dictatorship organised many initiatives to further these relations, such as the 1929 Iberian-American Exhibition in Seville, where it invited Latin American countries to attend. It signed commercial treaties with Argentina and Cuba, and established radio-telegraph links with Uruguay and Brazil, among other Latin-American countries. After the Rif War, Primo de Rivera's dictatorship pushed for Tangier to be included in the Spanish protectorate in Morocco. A conference with France in 1927 failed to settle the matter, as did a 1928 conference with France, Italy, and Britain. All the dictatorship gained was the post of the city's chief of police and improvements in the protection of arms trafficking in Tangier's international zone. Primo de Rivera also launched an unsuccessful campaign for Spain to have a permanent seat in the League of Nations in 1926, leaving and re-joining the League of Nations in the process, still as a non-permanent member.

=== Economic policies ===
Primo de Rivera's dictatorship nationalised Spain's economy throughout the Civil Directory. It suppressed free trade and strictly supervised all economic activity in Spain. In 1927, the dictatorship created CAMPSA, a Spanish oil monopoly, by confiscating the installations and sales outlets of private oil companies in Spain, including large foreign firms like Shell. Primo de Rivera also raised tariffs on foreign goods, with the League of Nations labelling Spain the most protectionist country in the world in 1927. Spanish goods were promoted over foreign goods, and the dictatorship launched campaigns that presented buying Spanish goods as patriotic while it criticised Spaniards who assumed that foreign goods were better quality than Spanish goods.

Primo de Rivera's dictatorship increased spending on public infrastructure and worked to improve roads, railways, irrigation networks, and more. The dictatorship paid for these improvements by taking on large amounts of debt, and this led to a temporary increase in economic growth. (Note: The sources disagree on the extent of the economic growth and how much of it was caused by the dictatorship's spending on public works.) Originally, the dictatorship was going to fund these improvements by implementing a progressive tax system, where Spain's wealthiest people would pay more in tax. This plan was dropped after much resistance from the upper classes. In 1929, Spain experienced an economic downturn that coincided with the start of the Great Depression, and Spaniards lost confidence in Primo de Rivera's dictatorship. The dictatorship also struggled to maintain the exchange rate of Spain's currency, the peseta, and no economic policy it tried stopped the peseta from falling in value.

=== Social change ===
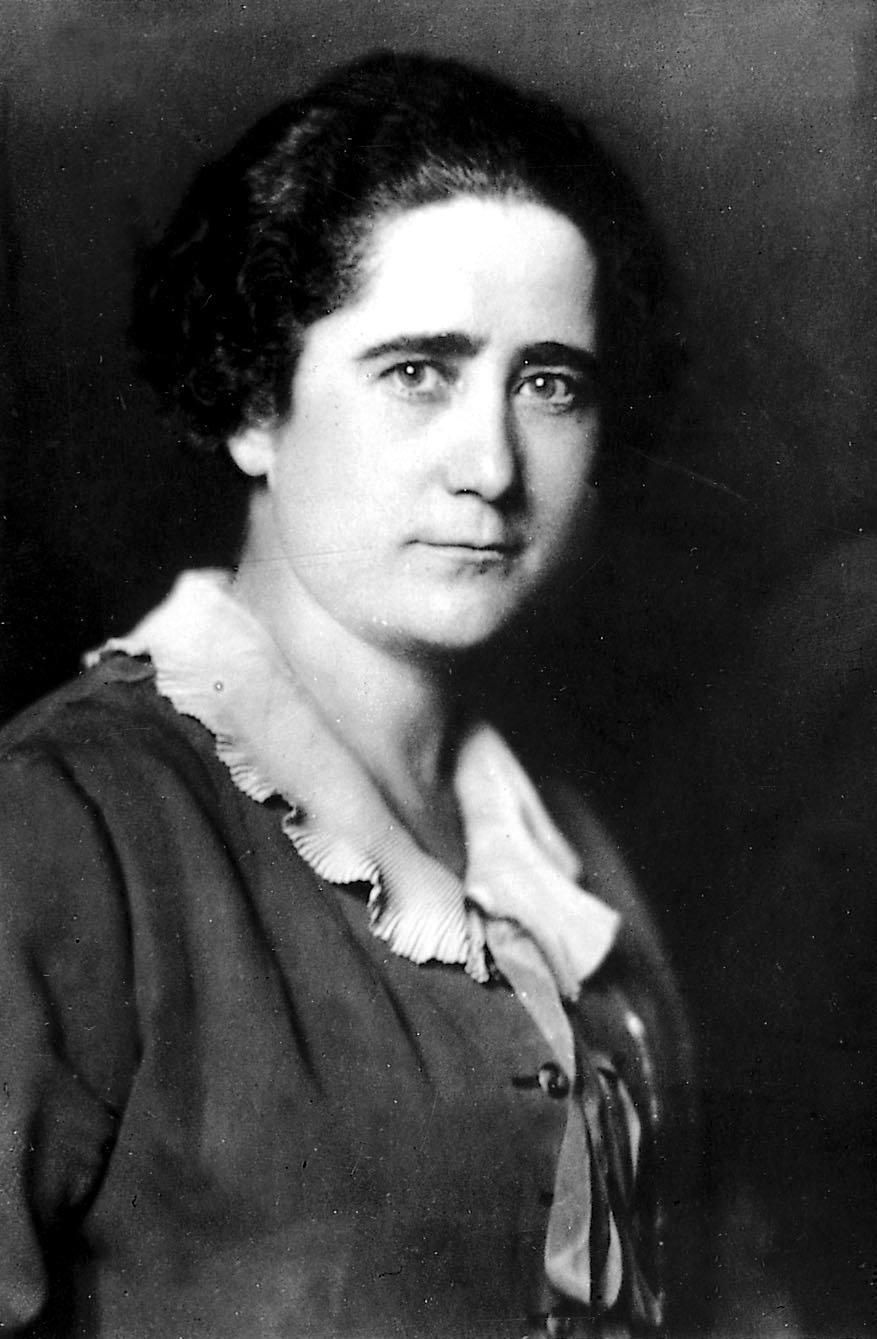
Clara Campoamor – who refused a seat on the National Assembly – in 1930

In 1924, the dictatorship of Primo de Rivera gave unmarried women the right to vote in local elections if they were older than 23 and not subject to any parental authority. (Note: Ruiz & Rubio-Marín 2012, pp. 292–293 see this as an attempt by Primo de Rivera to gain women's support.) Women were also allowed to run for office in town councils, and fourteen women were invited to be on the National Assembly in 1927. However, Primo de Rivera made his view on the role of women clear, saying: "Women can do as much good as men, and undertake and accomplish all the tasks performed by men. But there is one that is essential in women: housekeeping, and that is what really underscores their importance." The dictatorship encouraged large families, and in 1926 it started subsidising families with more than eight children. (Note: According to Rial 1978, p. 215, this policy had little effect on Spain's falling birth rate.) The dictatorship also protected the rights of individual workers with its 1926 labour code. It introduced maternity benefits and allowed nursing mothers a paid hour each day to feed their babies. In November 1926, the dictatorship created the National Corporative Association, where committees representing trade and industry would meet with an equal proportion of employers and employee representatives. They discussed legislation and aimed to solve labour conflicts between the groups. Women's participation in the workforce as skilled workers also increased rapidly from 1925 to 1930, as did the percentage of women in apprenticeship programs, which rose from 32.6% to 36.4% throughout the late 1920s. James Rial notes that these changes in women's status occurred without any political undertakings from the dictatorship.

== The dictatorship's collapse (1930) ==
The economic struggles of 1929 and the dictatorship's failure to stabilise the value of the peseta were large hits to its reputation. According to Carr, "it was not, however, the collapse of prosperity 1929 that brought down the regime: the fundamental failure was a political failure." Primo de Rivera failed to establish political legitimacy for his rule. The 1876 constitution was suspended when he came to power, and the new constitution created by the National Assembly was rejected by the monarchists, liberals, and republicans. The army also had grievances with Primo de Rivera and his dictatorship. These complaints mainly came from members of Spain's artillery corps, whom Primo de Rivera suspended in 1926. As the king saw Primo de Rivera lose support among the army, he could no longer support Primo de Rivera's dictatorship, and Primo de Rivera resigned on 28 January 1930, ending his dictatorship.

=== Legacy ===
Winners (by majority of seats) in Spain's judicial district capitals for the 1931 local elections. Republicans Monarchists No data

Following Primo de Rivera's resignation, the king appointed General Damaso Berenguer as the new Prime Minister of Spain. Berenguer prepared to return to the parliamentary monarchy that existed before Primo de Rivera's dictatorship. This plan was opposed by republicans, socialists, and people like Niceto Alcalá‐Zamora, who no longer supported Alfonso XIII or the monarchy. In Spain's next elections in 1931, republicans and their coalition (including the communists and socialists) won a majority of city council seats over monarchists in urban centres and provincial capitals. These results demonstrated how the public no longer favoured King Alfonso XIII. He resigned after the election, and Spain's Second Republic was established on the 14 or 15 of April 1931.

== See also ==
- 1923 Spanish coup d'état
- Civil Directory of Primo de Rivera
- European interwar dictatorships
- Fall of the dictatorship of Primo de Rivera
- Militar Directory of Primo de Rivera
- Restoration (Spain)

== Bibliography ==
- Ben-Ami, Shlomo (1977). "The Dictatorship of Primo de Rivera: A Political Reassessment". Journal of Contemporary History. 12 (1): 65–84. doi:10.1177/002200947701200103. ISSN 0022-0094. JSTOR 260237. S2CID 155074826.
- Berman, Sheri (2019). Democracy and Dictatorship in Europe: From the Ancien Régime to the Present Day. Oxford University Press. ISBN 9780199373208.
- Casanova, Julián; Gil Andrés, Carlos (2014). Twentieth-Century Spain: A History. Cambridge University Press. ISBN 978-1-107-01696-5.
- Radcliff, Pamela Beth (2017). Modern Spain: 1808 to the Present. Chicester, United Kingdom: John Wiley & Sons, Incorporated. p. 155. ISBN 978-1-405-18679-7.
- San Narciso, David; Barral-Martínez, Margarita; Armenteros, Carolina, eds. (2020). Monarchy and Liberalism in Spain: The Building of the Nation-State, 1780–1931. London: Routledge. ISBN 9780367633820.
- Smith, Angel (1 January 2007). "The Catalan Counter-Revolutionary Coalition and the Primo de Rivera Coup, 1917–23". European History Quarterly. 37 (1): 7–34. doi:10.1177/0265691407071800. S2CID 144883544.
- Aresti, Nerea (1 April 2020). "A Fight for Real Men: Gender and Nation-Building during the Primo de Rivera Dictatorship (1923–1930)". European History Quarterly. 50 (2): 248–265. doi:10.1177/0265691420910947. S2CID 216334936.
- James, Harold; Tanner, Jakob, eds. (2017). Enterprise in the Period of Fascism in Europe. London: Routledge. ISBN 9781315256375.
- Martin, Benjamin (2019). The Agony of Modernization: Labor and Industrialization in Spain. Cornell University Press. ISBN 9781501737121.
- Cowans, Jon (2003). Modern Spain: A Documentary History. University of Pennsylvania Press. ISBN 9780812218466.
- Quiroga, Alejandro (2007). Making Spaniards. London: Palgrave Macmillan. ISBN 978-0-230-01968-3.
- Ben-Ami, Shlomo (1983). Fascism from above: The Dictatorship of Primo de Rivera in Spain, 1923-1930. Oxford: Clarendon Press. ISBN 0198225962.
- Dalmau, Pol (2017). Press, Politics and National Identity in Catalonia: The Transformation of La Vanguardia, 1881-1931. Brighton: Sussex Academic Press. ISBN 978-1-84519-815-2.
- Salvadó, Francisco J. Romero (1999). Twentieth-Century Spain. London: Macmillan Press. ISBN 978-1-349-27523-6.
- Rial, James H. (1978). The Reforms of the Dictatorship of Miguel Primo De Rivera (PhD thesis). Northwestern University.
- Desmond, R. T. (1924). "The New Regime in Spain". Foreign Affairs. 2 (3): 457–473. doi:10.2307/20028314. JSTOR 20028314.
- Ben-Ami, Shlomo (1979). "The Forerunners of Spanish Fascism: Unión Patriótica and Unión Monárquica". European Studies Review. 9 (1): 49–79. doi:10.1177/026569147900900104. S2CID 143102141.
- Spencer, Henry R. (1927). "European Dictatorships". American Political Science Review. 21 (3): 537–551. doi:10.2307/1945508. hdl:2027/osu.32435003995057. JSTOR 1945508. S2CID 251092711.
- Carr, Raymond (1966). Spain: 1808–1939. Oxford: Clarendon Press. ISBN 9780198221029.
- Quiroga, Alejandro (2020). "Home Patriots: Spanish Nation-Building at a Local Level in the Primo de Rivera Dictatorship (1923–1930)". European History Quarterly. 50 (2): 266–289. doi:10.1177/0265691420910927. S2CID 216369958.
- Callahan, William James (2000). The Catholic Church in Spain, 1875–1998. Washington, D.C: Catholic University of America Press. ISBN 9780813209616.
- Tortella, Gabriel; Ruiz, José Luis García (2013). Spanish Money and Banking: A History. London: Palgrave Macmillan. ISBN 978-1-349-34491-8.
- Payne, Stanley G. (1999). Fascism in Spain, 1923–1977. University of Wisconsin Press. ISBN 978-0-299-16564-2.
- Rico-Gómez, María Luisa (2021). "The Work School in Spain: Training Citizens and Industrial Technicians (1923–1930)". History of Education. 50 (3): 378–394. doi:10.1080/0046760X.2020.1856945. S2CID 233922747.
- Watson, Cameron J. (1992). Basque Nationalism during the Dictatorship of Primo de Rivera, 1923–1930 (M.A. thesis). University of Nevada, Reno. ProQuest 230585752.
- Rial, James H. (1986). Revolution from Above: The Primo de Rivera Dictatorship in Spain, 1923–1930. Illinois: Associated University Presses. ISBN 9780913969014.
- Payne, Stanley G. (1967). Politics and the Military in Modern Spain. Stanford: Stanford University Press. ISBN 9780804701280.
- Pennell, C. R. (1982). "Ideology and Practical Politics: A Case Study of the Rif War in Morocco, 1921–1926". International Journal of Middle East Studies. 14 (1): 19–33. doi:10.1017/S0020743800026568. S2CID 153433961.
- Fleming, Shannon E.; Fleming, Ann K. (1977). "Primo de Rivera and Spain's Moroccan Problem, 1923–27". Journal of Contemporary History. 12 (1): 85–99. doi:10.1177/002200947701200104. S2CID 154744703.
- Seoane, Susana Sueiro (1998). "Spanish Colonialism during Primo de Rivera's Dictatorship". Mediterranean Historical Review. 13 (1–2): 48–64. doi:10.1080/09518969808569735.
- Desmond, R. T. (1927). "Dictatorship in Spain". Foreign Affairs. 5 (2): 276–292. doi:10.2307/20028527. JSTOR 20028527.
- Saz, Ismael (1999). "Foreign Policy under the Dictatorship of Primo de Rivera". Spain and the Great Powers in the Twentieth Century. Routledge. ISBN 9780203049099.
- Martínez del Campo, Luis G (2021). "Weak State, Powerful Culture: The Emergence of Spanish Cultural Diplomacy, 1914–1936". Contemporary European History. 30 (2): 198–213. doi:10.1017/S0960777320000636. S2CID 233773778.
- Souto, Ana (2017). "Post-Colonial Legacies in Seville: Traces of the Iberoamerican Exhibition, 1929". Entremons: UPF Journal of World History: 74–104.
- Gray, G. H.; Fairbank, N. K. (1930). "Madrid-Buenos Aires Radio Link and Its Wire Connections". Electrical Communication. 8: 208–212.
- Lopez, Jose M. Romeo (2010). The First Spanish Short Wave Stations. Development of Radio & Tv Technology. Second IEEE Region 8 Conference on the History of Telecommunications Conference, HISTELCON 2010. Madrid. pp. 1–5. doi:10.1109/HISTELCON.2010.5735273. ISBN 978-1-4244-7450-9.
- Whealey, Robert H. (1988). "Anglo-American Oil Confronts Spanish Nationalism, 1927–31: A Study of Economic Imperialism". Diplomatic History. 12 (2): 111–126. doi:10.1111/j.1467-7709.1988.tb00467.x.
- Carreras, Albert; Tafunell, Xavier; Torres, Eugenio (2000). "The Rise and Decline of Spanish State-Owned Firms". The Rise and Fall of State-Owned Enterprise in the Western World. Cambridge: Cambridge University Press. ISBN 9780521780810.
- Sharman, Nick (2021). "Economic Nationalism to Autarky". Britain's Informal Empire in Spain, 1830-1950: Free Trade, Protectionism and Military Power. Cham: Springer International Publishing. ISBN 978-3-030-77949-8.
- Jorge-Sotelo, Enrique (2019). 'Escaping' the Great Depression: Monetary Policy, Financial Crises and Banking in Spain, 1921-1935 (PhD thesis). London School of Economics and Political Science.
- Puzzo, Dante A. (1962). Spain and the Great Powers 1936–1941. Columbia University Press. Reprint: ISBN 9780231891097.
- La Parra-Pérez, Álvaro (2020). "For a Fistful of Pesetas? The Political Economy of the Army in a Nonconsolidated Democracy: The Second Spanish Republic and Civil War (1931–9)". The Economic History Review. 73 (2): 565–594. doi:10.1111/ehr.12881. S2CID 201334205.
- Greene, Thomas R. (1976). "The English Catholic Press and the Second Spanish Republic, 1931–1936". Church History. 45 (1): 70–84. doi:10.2307/3164566. JSTOR 3164566. S2CID 159929227.
- Hogan, Agnes M. (1937). The Establishment of the Second Spanish Republic (M.A. thesis). Fordham University.
- Riley, Dylan J. (2010). The Civic Foundations of Fascism in Europe: Italy, Spain, and Romania, 1870–1945. Baltimore: Johns Hopkins University Press. ISBN 9781786635259.
- Marichal, Juan (1981). "The Transitional Significance of the Second Spanish Republic and the Civil War (1931-1939)". Harvard Library Bulletin. XXIX (3): 255–260.
- Boyd, Carolyn P. (1984). "'Responsibilities' and the Second Spanish Republic 1931-6". European History Quarterly. 14 (2): 151–182. doi:10.1177/026569148401400202. S2CID 144985089.*
- Ruiz, Blanca Rodriguez; Rubio-Marín, Ruth (2012). The Struggle for Female Suffrage in Europe: Voting to Become Citizens. Brill Publishers. ISBN 978-90-04-22991-4.
- Pack, Sasha D. (2019). "The Blighted Republic". The Deepest Border. Stanford University Press. ISBN 9781503607538.
- "SPAIN AND ITALY JOUST ON TANGIER; Premier de Rivera Repeats Demand That Zone Be Included in Spanish Protectorate". The New York Times. 20 August 1926. p. 8.
