= Iron surgeon =

The iron surgeon (Spanish: cirujano de hierro) was a term coined by Spanish author and regenerationist politician Joaquín Costa after the crisis of '98. It referred to a hypothetical figure that would cure Spain's political maladies.

Costa first proposed the iron surgeon in his 1902 work Oligarchy and Caciquismo as the Current Form of Government in Spain: Urgency and Means of Changing It [Oligarquía y caciquismo como forma actual de gobierno en España: urgencia y modo de cambiarla]:

This surgical policy, I repeat, must be the personal charge of an iron surgeon, who knows the anatomy of Spain well and feels an infinite compassion for it...

This figure, a type of benevolent dictator with fundamentally spiritual qualities, would be charged with enacting policies to eliminate caciquismo at the margins of parliament to improve the country.

The iron surgeon could be understood as a Spanish version of the Nietzschean Übermensch, and was a product of Costa's disenfranchisement with the political system of the Restoration and his progressive political radicalization. Costa defended himself from criticism, insisting that the surgeon did not necessarily have to be identified with a dictator. Enrique Tierno Galván identified Costa's ideas as proto-fascist, although Sebastian Balfour argued that they aligned more with 19th-century praetorian liberalism than with 20th-century totalitarianism.

Costa's ideas were a recurring theme in the writings of Miguel Primo de Rivera, who saw himself as the iron surgeon and incorporated himself into the regenerationist discourse of the Military Directorate.
