= Santos Juliá =

Spanish historian (1940–2019)

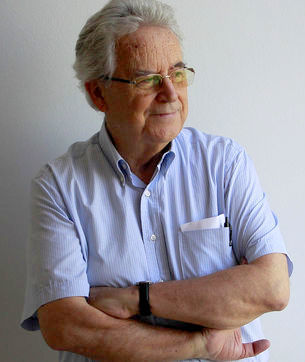
- Born: 16 September 1940; Ferrol
- Died: 23 October 2019; Majadahonda
- Education: Complutense University of Madrid
- Occupations: Sociologist, political scientist
- Employer: National University of Distance Education (1979–)
- Awards: National History Award (2005); Francisco Umbral Prize for Book of the Year (2018); Medal of Merit in Research and University Education (2019)

Santos Juliá Díaz (16 September 1940 – 23 October 2019) was a Spanish historian and sociologist.

== Biography ==
Born in Ferrol in 1940, he spent some of his first years in Vigo, moving soon to Seville, where he studied at the Instituto San Isidoro. He took studies in Theology, but graduated in Sociology. He was a strong admirer of Manuel Azaña.

Juliá joined the Universidad Nacional de Educación a Distancia (UNED) as lecturer in 1979, earning a PhD in Political Science and Sociology at the Complutense University of Madrid with a dissertation elaborated in the 1980s. Since 1980, Juliá wrote pieces as columnist for El País. He obtained the Chair of Social History and Political Thought at the UNED in 1989.

He died on 23 October 2019 in Majadahonda (Madrid).

In November 2019 he was awarded, posthumously, with the Gold Medal of Merit in Research and University Education.

== Works ==
- — (1984). Madrid, 1931–1934. De la fiesta popular a la lucha de clases. Madrid: Siglo XXI.
- — (1997). Los socialistas en la política española.
- — (2004). Historias de las dos Españas. (Note: Awarded with the 2005 National Award of History.)
- — (2008). Vida y tiempo de Manuel Azaña (1880-1940).
- — (2010). Hoy no es ayer.
- — (2011). Elogio de historia en tiempo de memoria.
- — (2017). Transición. Historia de una política española (1937-2017). Barcelona: Crítica.
