= Praetorianism =

Excessive influence of the military in a country

Praetorianism means excessive or abusive political influence of the armed forces in a country. The word comes from the Roman Praetorian Guard, who became increasingly influential in the appointment of Roman emperors.

Daniel R. Headrick, professor of History and Social Sciences at Roosevelt University, describes praetorianism as a type of militarism oriented to the interior life of a nation, often related to minor countries, that does not aspire to fight or win international wars, but instead to maintain its influence in the domestic political system, controlling decisions that could affect the interests of the military as a corporation, or supporting some particular political faction or party.

In his book Political Order in Changing Societies, the political scientist Samuel P. Huntington uses the term praetorian to designate social orders in which political participation is high relative to their political institutionalization. A low ratio of institutionalization to participation, he argued, would then lead to political decay.
